= List of Christian mystics =

Christian mysticism refers to the development of mystical practices and theory within Christianity. It has often been connected to mystical theology, especially in the Roman Catholic and Orthodox Christianity (both the Eastern Orthodox and Oriental Orthodox traditions).

The attributes and means by which Christian mysticism is studied and practiced are varied. They range from ecstatic visions of the soul's mystical union with God to simple prayerful contemplation of Holy Scripture (i.e., Lectio Divina).

The experiences of mystics are often framed within theological approaches to God, such as Quietism, Pietism, etc.; therefore, in order to aid in the understanding of Christian mysticism, this list includes some philosophers, theologians, anonymous theological books, religious groups and movements whose ideas and practices have had an influence on Christian mystics and the Christian mystical experience.

- Remember to add the Category:Christian mystics to the articles.

== 1st century ==
- John the Baptist (c. 6 BC– c. AD 30)
- Simon Peter (? –c. 64–68);
- Paul the Apostle (? –c. 66);
- Mark the Evangelist (c. 12 AD–c. 68 AD)
- Luke the Evangelist (c. early 1st century)
- John the Apostle (? –c.100);

== 2nd century ==
- Hermas (freedman) (2nd century)
- John of Patmos (2nd century)
- Origen (c. 184-253)

== 3rd century ==
- Dionysius of Alexandria (?-264) also known as Dionysius the Great
- Gregory Thaumaturgus (213–270)
- Anthony the Great (c. 251–356)
- Desert Fathers (3rd c.)

== 4th century ==
- Macarius of Egypt (c.300–90)
- Augustine of Hippo (c.354–430)
- Priscillian of Ávila (d.385)
- Evagrius Ponticus (345–399)
- John Chrysostom (c.347–407)
- John of Lycopolis (d.c.394)
- Gregory of Nyssa (c.340–94)
- John Cassian (c.360–434)
- Maron (4th c.)
- Desert Mothers (4th–5th c.)

== 5th century ==
- Stephen Bar Sudhaile (5th century)

== 6th century ==
- Aeneas of Gaza (d. c. 518)
- John Climacus (525–606);
- Maximus the Confessor (c.580–662);
- Pseudo-Dionysius the Areopagite (5th–6th c), also known as Pseudo-Dionysius;
- Julianus pomerius (6th c);

== 7th century ==
- Isaac of Nineveh (7th c);
- Anastasius Sinaita (7th c);

== 8th century ==
- Aldebert (8th century)

== 9th century ==
- Johannes Scotus Eriugena (c.810–77);

== 10th century ==
- Symeon the New Theologian (949–1022);
- Gregory of Narek (951–1003);
- Wiborada (d. 926);

== 11th century ==
- Niketas Stethatos (c.1005 – c.1090)
- Gundolfo (teaching in 1024);
- Bruno of Cologne (c.1032–1101);
- Anselm of Canterbury (1033–1109);
- Hugh of St Victor (c.1078–1141), also known as Hugh the Saxon;
- William of St. Thierry (c.1085–1148);
- Bernard of Clairvaux (1090–1153);
- Henry of Lausanne (d.c. 1148), also known as Henry the Monk;
- Christina of Markyate (1097–1161)
- Hildegard of Bingen (1098–1179);
- Cathars (11th to 13th century);

== 12th century ==
- Peter Lombard (c.1100–1160);
- Aelred or Ailred of Rievaulx (1110–1167);
- Peter of Bruys (1117–c.1131);
- Alain de Lille (c. 1128–1202);
- Elizabeth of Schonau (1129–1164);
- Joachim of Fiore (c.1131–1202);
- Peter Waldo (c.1140–1218);
- Adam of St. Victor (d.1146);
- Thierry of Chartres (d.c.1150);
- Hadewijch of Antwerp (c.1150–1200);
- Yvette of Huy (1158–1228);
- David of Dinant (c.1160–1217);
- Richard of St. Victor (d. 1173);
- Waldensians (c.1177–1532);
- Edmund Rich (c.1180–1240);
- Francis of Assisi (1181–1226);
- Lutgardis (1182–1246);
- Guigo II (d. 1188 or 1193)
- Clare of Assisi (1194–1253);
- Anthony of Padua (1195–1231);
- Marie of Oignies (d.1213);
- Alice of Schaerbeek (d.1250);

== 13th century ==
- Thomas Gallus (c.1200–1246)
- Beatrice of Nazareth (1200–1268)
- David of Augsburg (c.1200–1272)
- Albertus Magnus (1200–1280)
- Brethren of the Free Spirit (c.1200)
- Amalric of Bena (died c. 1204–1207), also known as Amaury de Bène or Amaury de Chartres; also known as Almaricus, Amalricus, Amauricus
- Mechthild of Magdeburg (1210–1285 or 1295)
- Douceline of Digne (1214–1274)
- Bonaventure of Bagnoregio (1221–1274)
- Joachim of Flora (1135-1202)
- Jacopone da Todi (c.1230–1306)
- Ramon Llull (c.1232–1315)
- Marguerite d'Oingt (of Mionnay) (c.1240–1306/1310)
- Mechtilde of Hackeborn (1241–1299)
- Christina von Stommeln (1242–1312)
- Angela of Foligno (1248–1309)
- Gertrude the Great (1256–1302), also known as Gertrude of Helfta
- Juliana of Cornillon (d.1258)
- Ida van Leeuw (d.1260)
- Meister Eckhart (1260–1328)
- Heilwige Bloemardinne (1265?-1335) also known as Heilwijch Blomart
- Christina Ebner (1277–1355)
- Margareta Ebner (1291–1351)
- John of Ruysbroeck (1293–1381)
- Gregory Palamas (c.1296–1359)
- Henry Suso (c.1296–1366)
- Ida of Louvain (d.1300);
- Marguerite Porete (of Hainaut) (d.1310)
- Agnes Blannbekin (c. 1244–1315)
- Elizabeth of Spalbeek (d.1316)
- Henry of Nördlingen (d. c. 1352)
- Gertrude of Oosten (d.1358)
- Gerard Appelmans (13th c)
- The Ancrene Rule (13th c)
- Beguines and Beghards (13th c)

== 14th century ==
- Richard Rolle (c.1300-49)
- Johannes Tauler (c.1300-1361)
- Jeanne Daubenton (d. 1372)
- Bridget of Sweden (1303–1373)
- Rulman Merswin (c.1307-82)
- William Flete (d.c. 1383)
- Nicholas of Basel (1308–1397)
- Nicholas Kabasilas or Cabasilas (1319/1323-1392)
- William Langland (c. 1330-1400)
- Geert Groote (1340–84)
- Walter Hilton (d.1396)
- Julian of Norwich (1342–1416)
- The Cloud of Unknowing (c.1345-1386)
- Catherine of Siena (1347–1380)
- Book of the Nine Rocks (c.1351)
- Hendrik Mande (c.1360-1431)
- Jean le Charlier de Gerson (1363–1429)
- Gerard Zerbolt of Zutphen (1367–1398)
- Margery Kempe (1373–1438)
- Dorothea of Montau (1347-1394)
- Gerlac Peterson (1378–1411)
- Lydwine of Schiedam (1380–1432)
- Thomas à Kempis (1380–1471)
- Nicholas Cabasilas (14th c)
- Nicholas of Strasburg (14th c)
- Henry of Norlingen (14th c)
- Friends of God (14th c)
- Theologia Germanica (late 14th c)
- Turlupins (14th c)

== 15th century ==
- John Norton (d. 1462)
- Nicholas of Cusa (1401–1464)
- Denys of Rykel (1402–1471), also known as Denis the Carthusian
- Hendrik Herp (c. 1410-1477)
- Joan of Arc (1412–1431)
- Alain de la Roche (1428–1475)
- Columba Rieti (c.1430-1501)
- Catherine of Genoa (1447–1510)
- Osanna Andreasi of Mantua (1449–1505)
- Richard Methley (b.1451)
- Garcias de Cisneros (c.1456-1510)
- Hans Böhm (d.1476)
- Balthasar Hubmaier (c. 1480–1528)
- Bernardino de Laredo (1482–1540)
- La Beata de Piedrahita (c.1485—1524)
- Andreas Karlstadt (1486–1541)
- Catherine of Racconigi (1487–1574)
- Thomas Müntzer (c. 1488–1525)
- Caspar Schwenckfeld (1489/90–1561)
- Ignatius of Loyola (1491–1556)
- George Blaurock (c. 1491–1529)
- Paracelsus (1493–1541)
- Osanna of Cattaro (1493–1565)
- Hans Denck (c.1495-1527)
- Menno Simons (1496–1561)
- Battistina Vernazza (1497–1587)
- Conrad Grebel (c. 1498-1526)
- Felix Manz (c. 1498–1527)
- Sebastian Franck (1499–1542)
- Peter of Alcantara (1499–1562)
- Nicholas Storch (d. 1525)
- Francisco de Osuna (d.c.1540)
- Lucia of Narni (15th c)

== 16th century ==
- Juan of Avila (1500–1569)
- Alonso de Orozco Mena (1500–1591)
- David Joris (c.1501-1556)
- Hendrik Niclaes (c.1501-1580)
- Luis de Granada (1504–1588)
- Louis de Blois (1506 – 1566) also known as Blosius
- Teresa of Ávila (1515–1582) also known as Teresa of Jesus
- Philip Neri (1515–1595)
- Catherine de Ricci (1522–1590)
- Diego de Estella (1524–1578)
- Luis de Leon (1528–1591)
- Juan de los Angeles (1536–1609)
- John of the Cross (1542–1591)
- Martin Moller (1547–1606)
- Giordano Bruno (1548–1600)
- Balthasar Walther (1558–c. 1631)
- Benet of Canfield (1562–1610)
- Thomas a Jesu (1564–1627)
- Mary Magdalene de' Pazzi (1566–1607)
- Marie of the Incarnation (Carmelite) (1566–1618) - also known as Madame Acarie
- François de Sales (1567–1622)
- Cecilia del Nacimiento (1570–1646)
- John of St. Samson (1571–1636)
- Joseph Hall (1574–1656)
- Jakob Böhme (1575–1624)
- Pierre de Berulle (1575–1629)
- Augustine Baker (1575–1641)
- Joseph Leclerc du Tremblay (1577–1638)
- Rose of Lima (1586–1617)
- Louis Lallemant (1587–1635)
- Charles de Condren (1588–1641)
- Margaret of the Blessed Sacrament (1590-1660)
- Angelique Arnauld (1591–1661)
- Nicholas Ferrar (1592–1637)
- Maria Angela Astorch (1592–1665)
- George Herbert (1593–1633)
- Abraham von Franckenberg (1593–1652)
- Agnes Arnauld (1593–1671)
- Marie of the Incarnation (Ursuline) (1599–1672)
- Los Alumbrados (16th c)
- Francisco de Osuna (16th c)
- Bernardino de Laredo (16th c)
- Isabel de la Cruz (16th c)
- Pedro de Alcaraz (16th c)

== 17th century ==
- Jean Joseph Surin (1600–65)
- John Eudes (1601–80)
- María de Ágreda (1602–1665) also known as Maria of Jesus, or Blue Nun
- Adam Boreel (1602–1665)
- Ursula de Jesus (1604–1666)
- Thomas Browne (1605–1682)
- Dame Gertrude More (1606–33)
- John Pordage (1607–1681)
- Jean-Jacques Olier (1608–1657)
- John Reeve (1608–1658)
- Thomas Totney (1608–1659)
- Gerrard Winstanley (c.1609-55)
- Benjamin Whichcote (1609–83)
- Ludowicke Muggleton (1609–98)
- Brother Lawrence (c. 1610-1691)
- Richard Crashaw (c.1612-49)
- Antoine Arnauld (1612–94)
- Jeremy Taylor (1613–67)
- Henry More (1614–87)
- Isaac Penington (1616–79)
- Antoinette Bourignon (1616–80)
- Ralph Cudworth (1617–88)
- John Smith (Platonist) (1618–52)
- James Nayler (1618–1660)
- Thomas Vaughan (philosopher) (1621–1666) a.k.a. "Eugenius Philalethes"
- Henry Vaughan (1622–1695)
- Blaise Pascal (1623–1662)
- Jane Leade (1624–1704)
- Angelus Silesius (1624–77) also known as Johann Scheffler
- George Fox (1624–1691)
- Jacques-Benigne Bossuet (1627–1704)
- François Malaval (1637-1719)
- Miguel de Molinos (1628–1697)
- Úrsula Micaela Morata (1628–1703)
- Thomas Bromley (1629–1691)
- Philipp Jakob Spener (1635–1705)
- Thomas Traherne (c.1636-74)
- Charles Marshall (1637–1698)
- Johann George Gichtel (1638–1710)
- Johann Jacob Zimmermann (1644–1693)
- Jakob Ammann (c.1644-1730)
- Pierre Poiret (1646–1719)
- Margaret Mary Alacoque (1647–80)
- Madame Guyon (1648–1717) also known as Jeanne Marie Bouvier de la Motte Guyon
- Johann Wilhelm Petersen (1649–1727)
- Quirinus Kuhlmann (1651–1689)
- François Fénelon (1651–1715)
- Georg von Welling (1652–1727)
- The Light upon the Candlestick (1663)
- Gottfried Arnold (1666–1714)
- Johannes Kelpius (1673–1708)
- Louis de Montfort (1673–1716)
- Jean Pierre de Caussade (1675–1751);
- Kimpa Vita (1684–1706), also known as Dona Beatriz
- John Heylyn (1685–1759)
- William Law (1686–1761)
- Emanuel Swedenborg (1688–1772)
- Christoph Schütz (1689–1750)
- Conrad Beissel (1691–1768)
- Alphonsus Maria de Liguori (1696–1787)
- Gerhard Tersteegen (1697–1769)
- Collegiants (17th c)
- Pierre Guerin (17th c)
- Joseph Salmon (17th c)

== 18th century ==
- Sarah Pierpont (1710–58) - also known as Sarah Edwards
- Catalina de Jesús Herrera (1717-1795)
- John Woolman (1720–1772)
- Hindiyya al-'Ujaimi (1720-1798)
- Hryhori Skovoroda (1722–94)
- Tikhon of Zadonsk (1724–83)
- Jean Grou (1731–1803)
- Ann Lee (1736–1784)
- Louis-Claude de Saint-Martin (1743–1803)
- Karl von Eckartshausen (1752–1803)
- William Blake (1757–1827)
- George Rapp (1757–1847)
- Seraphim of Sarov (1759–1833)
- William Wordsworth (1770–1850)
- Bernard-Raymond Fabré-Palaprat (1773–1838)
- Anna Catherine Emmerich (1774–1824)
- William Miller (1782–1849)
- Madame Swetchine (1782–1857)
- Justinus Kerner (1786–1862)
- Bernhard Müller (1788–1834)
- Joseph Bates (1792–1872)
- Dionysius Andreas Freher (18th c)

== 19th century ==
- Jakob Lorber (1800–1864)
- Friederike Hauffe (1801–1829)
- Brigham Young (1801–1877)
- Phineas Parkhurst Quimby (1802–1866)
- Hiram Edson (1806–1882)
- William Keil (1812–1877)
- James Strang (1813–1856)
- James Springer White (1821–1881)
- Henri Frederic Amiel (1821–1881)
- Coventry Kersey Dighton Patmore (1823–96)
- Ellen G. White (1827–1915)
- Andrew Murray (1828-1917)
- Charbel Makhlouf (1828-1898)
- J. N. Andrews (1829–1883)
- John of Kronstadt (1829–1908)
- Bernadette Soubirous (1844–1879)
- Malinda Cramer (1844–1906)
- Maria Woodworth-Etter (1844–1924)
- Myrtle Fillmore (1845–1931)
- Quanah Parker (1845-1911)
- Thomas Troward (1847–1916)
- Richard Jefferies (1848–87)
- H. Emilie Cady (1848–1941)
- Emma Curtis Hopkins (1849–1925)
- Charles Taze Russell (1852–1916)
- Vladimir Solovyov (1853–1900)
- Lilias Trotter (1853–1928)
- Charles Fillmore (1854–1948)
- Charles Eugene de Foucauld (1858–1916)
- Henry Thomas Hamblin (1873 – 1958)
- Ambroise Gardeil (1859–1931)
- Smith Wigglesworth (1859–1947)
- Juan Gonzalez Arintero (1860–1928)
- William Ralph Inge (1860–1954)
- Rudolf Steiner (1861–1925)
- Nona L. Brooks (1861–1945)
- Feliksa Kozlowska (1862–1921) also known as Felicja Kozlowska, Sister Maria Franciszka
- William Walker Atkinson (1862–1932)
- Concepción Cabrera de Armida (1862 – 1937)
- Hilma af Klint (1862–1944)
- Rufus Jones (1863–1948)
- Peter Deunov (1864–1944)
- Max Heindel (1865–1919)
- John Chapman (1865–1933)
- Silouan the Athonite (1866–1938)
- Joseph Franklin Rutherford (1869—1942)
- Grigori Rasputin (1869–1916)
- William J. Seymour (1870–1922)
- John G. Lake (1870–1935)
- Lilian Staveley (1871–1928)
- Sergei Bulgakov (1871–1944)
- Thérèse de Lisieux (1873–1897)
- Nikolai Berdyaev (1874–1948)
- Gabrielle Bossis (1874–1950)
- Jörg Lanz von Liebenfels (1874–1954)
- Rainer Maria Rilke (1875–1926)
- Lena Sadler (1875–1939)
- Evelyn Underhill (1875–1941)
- William S. Sadler (1875–1969)
- Antonin Gadal (1877–1962)
- Edgar Cayce (1877–1945)
- Reginald Garrigou-Lagrange (1877–1964)
- Gemma Galgani (1878–1903)
- Margaret Prescott Montague (1878–1955)
- Elizabeth of the Trinity (1880–1906)
- Reginald Somerset Ward (1881–1962)
- Pierre Teilhard de Chardin (1881–1955)
- Pavel Florensky (1882–1937)
- Corinne Heline (1882–1975)
- Paul Foster Case (1884–1954)
- Charles Williams (1886–1945)
- Emmet Fox (1886–1951)
- Walter C. Lanyon (1887–1967)
- Padre Pio (1887–1968), also known as Pio of Pietrelcina
- T. S. Eliot (1888–1965)
- Sadhu Sundar Singh (1889–1929)
- Aimee Semple McPherson (1890–1944)
- Joel S. Goldsmith (1892–1964)
- Thomas R. Kelly (1893–1941)
- John Maximovitch (1896–1966)
- Jan van Rijckenborgh (1896–1968)
- Archimandrite Sophrony (1896–1993)
- Aiden Wilson Tozer (1897–1963)
- Therese Neumann (1898–1962)
- C.S. Lewis (1898–1963)
- Porfiry Ivanov (1898–1983)
- Corneliu Zelea Codreanu (1899-1938)
- Howard Thurman (1899-1981)

== 20th century ==
- Jan Tyranowski (1900–1947)
- Sampson Sievers (1900–1979)
- Caryll Houselander (1901–1954)
- Catharose de Petri (1902–1990)
- Marthe Robin (1902–1981)
- Adrienne von Speyr (1902–1967)
- Vladimir Lossky (1903–1958)
- Watchman Nee (1903–1972)
- Itala Mela (1904–1957)
- Mary Faustina Kowalska (1905–1938)
- Dag Hammarskjöld (1905–1961)
- Witness Lee (1905–1997)
- Neville Goddard (1905–1972)
- Daniil Andreyev (1906–1959)
- Bede Griffiths (1906–1993)
- Eugenia Elisabetta Ravasio (1907–1990)
- William Branham (1909–1965)
- Flower A. Newhouse (1909–1994)
- Simone Weil (1909–1943)
- Nikolay Guryanov (1909–2002)
- Alphonsa Muttathupandathu (1910–1946)
- A. A. Allen (1911–1970)
- James Dillet Freeman (1912–2003)
- Thomas Merton (1915–1968)
- Vernon Howard (1918–1992)
- Jack Coe (1918–1956)
- Cyril Pavlov (1919–2017)
- Brian Cleeve (1921–2003)
- Thomas Keating (1923–2018)
- William Johnston (1925-2010)
- John Main (1926–1982)
- Peter Spink (1926–2010)
- John A. Sanford (1929–2005)
- Jacques Fesch (1930–1957)
- Anthony de Mello (1931–1987)
- Henri Nouwen (1932–1996)
- William Meninger (1932–2021)
- John Wimber (1934–1997)
- Kallistos Ware (1934–2022)
- Richard Foster (1942–)
- Vassula Rydén (1942–2024)
- Kathleen Norris (1947–)
- Lonnie Frisbee (1949–1993)
- Laurence Freeman (1951–)
- Anneliese Michel (1952–1976)
- Peter Bowes
- Clare Watts
- Mirna Nazzour (1964–)
- Zlatko Sudac (1971–)

== See also ==
- English Dissenters
- Esoteric Christianity
- German mysticism
- Heresy
- List of Christian theologians
- List of people burned as heretics
- Outline of spirituality
- Prophecy in the Seventh-day Adventist Church
- Saints and levitation

== Sources ==
- John Ferguson; Encyclopedia of Mysticism and Mystery Religions (Crossroad: New York, 1982)
- William Ralph Inge; Christian Mysticism (Methuen: London, 1899)
- Rufus M. Jones; Sprititual Reformers in the 16th and 17th Centuries (Beacon Press: Boston, 1959)
- E.H. Broadbent; The Pilgrim Church (Pickering & Inglis, Bassingstoke, 1985)
- Paul Szarmach, editor; An Introduction to the Medieval Mystics of Europe (State University of New York Press: Albany, 1984)
- R.I. Moore; The Birth of Popular Heresy (New York: St. Martin's Press, 1975)
- Evelyn Underhill; Mystics of the Church (Morehouse-Barlow: Wilton CT, 1925)
- F.C. Happold; Mysticism, A Study and an Anthology (Penguin Books: Baltimore, 1963)
