= List of female mystics =

This is a list of female mystics.

== Bahá'í faith ==
- Táhirih
- Bahíyyih Khánum
- Ásíyih Khánum

== Buddhism ==
- Alexandra David-Néel author of books on Tibetan Mysticism
- Khema
- Yaśodharā
- Patacara
- Uppalavanna
- Yeshe Tsogyal 8th century CE Tibetan mystic, consort of Padmasambhava

== Christianity ==
- Adrienne von Speyr
- Alexandrina of Balazar
- Angela of Foligno
- Anna Kingsford
- Anna Maria Taigi
- Anna Schäffer
- Anne Catherine Emmerich (blessed)
- Bárbara de Santo Domingo
- Beatrice of Nazareth Flemish nun
- Benvenuta Bojani
- Bernadette Soubirous
- Bridget of Sweden Swedish Saint
- Catherine of Genoa
- Catherine of Racconigi
- Catherine of Siena Italian saint
- Catalina de Jesús Herrera
- Cecilia del Nacimiento
- Christina Ebner
- Christina of Markyate
- Clare of Assisi
- Claire Ferchaud
- Consolata Betrone Italian nun
- Constance de Rabastens
- Cora Evans
- Edith Stein German Saint
- Faustina Kowalska
- Flower A. Newhouse
- Gemma Galgani
- Gertrude the Great - Saint
- Heilwige Bloemardinne
- Helen of Tottenham
- Hildegard of Bingen German saint
- Itala Mela Italian Venerable
- Jeanne Guyon
- Joan of Arc French saint
- Julian of Norwich
- Juliana of Liège
- Karmni Grima
- Lilian Staveley
- Louise Lateau
- Lucy Brocadelli
- Luisa Piccarreta
- Lydwine of Schiedam
- Maria Maddalena de' Pazzi
- Margaret of Ypres
- Margareta Ebner
- Margery Kempe
- Marguerite Bays Swiss (blessed)
- Marguerite d'Oingt
- Marguerite Porete
- Maria Angela Astorch
- Maria Bolognesi Italian (blessed)
- Maria Domitilla Galluzzi
- Maria Esperanza de Bianchini
- Maria Franciszka Kozłowska
- Maria Grazia Tarallo
- Maria Petyt
- Marie Julie Jahenny
- Marie Rose Ferron
- Marthe Robin
- Mechthild of Magdeburg
- Mother Shipton
- Natuzza Evolo
- Rosa Egipcíaca
- Simone Weil
- Sister Lúcia
- Teresa de Cartagena
- Teresa Luisa Gardi
- Teresa of Avila Spanish saint
- Teresa Urrea
- Thérèse of Lisieux
- Ursula Benincasa
- Ursula de Jesus
- Úrsula Micaela Morata

== Eastern mysticism and syncretism ==
- Ching Hai

== Hinduism ==
=== Vedic and classical ===
- Ghosha
- Gargi Vachaknavi
- Maitreyi
- Lopamudra

=== Medieval ===
- Akka Mahadevi
- Sant Andal (Nachiar or Goda-devi)
- Sant Avvaiyar
- Isaignaniyar
- Sant Bahinabai
- Sant Janabai
- Sant Kanhopatra
- Lalleshvari
- Sant Mirabai
- Gangasati
- Sant Molla
- Sant Muktabai
- Sant Nirmala
- Sant Rupa Bhawani, saint-poet
- Sant Sahajo Bai, 1725-1805
- Sant Sakhubai

=== Modern ===
- Amma Sri Karunamayi
- Anandamayi Ma
- Mata Amritanandamayi
- Ma Devi Jnanabhanishta
- The Mother
- Mother Meera
- Sarada Devi
- Gurumayi Chidvilasananda
- Daya Mata
- Sister Nivedita

== Islam ==
- Dada Masiti
- Rabi'a al-Adawiyya
- Hazrat Babajan

== Judaism ==
- Hannah Rachel Verbermacher

== Sikhism ==
- Bebe Nanaki

== Taoism ==
- Sun Bu'er

== Western mysticism and syncretism ==
- Helena Blavatsky
- Annie Besant
- Alice Bailey
- Mabel Collins
- Hilma af Klint
- Helena Roerich
- Florence Scovel Shinn
- Rasa Von Werder
