= Teresa Luisa Gardi =

18th and 19th-century Italian Catholic

Venerable Teresa Luisa Gardi TOFS
- Born: 22 October 1769; Imola, Bologna, Cisalpine Republic
- Died: 1 January 1837 (aged 67); Imola, Bologna, Papal States

Teresa Luisa Gardi (22 October 1769 – 1 January 1837) was an Italian Roman Catholic and a member of the Secular Franciscan Order. She devoted her life to the examples of the great saints John of the Cross and Teresa of Avila. She recorded a journal of experiences but such a journal did not reveal the details – she remained guarded on strong religious experiences.

Gardi was declared to be venerable in 2015, after Pope Francis recognized that she had lived a life of heroic virtue.

== Life ==
Teresa Luisa Gardi was born in Imola on 22 October 1769; she had three brothers and sisters. Her mother died first in 1782 and her father soon followed in 1790. Despite these losses she looked after her siblings as she was the eldest. Her adolescence was spent in the home as she cared for her siblings and despite her poor health she dedicated her free time to the sick and the poor. She was devoted to the Eucharist.

Gardi became a member of the Secular Franciscan Order in 1801 in an attempt to enter religious life and to follow the example of Saint Francis of Assisi. Her profession into the order was made on 15 October 1802. She also devoted her time to emulating the examples of both Saints John of the Cross and Teresa of Avila. It was in 1804 that she started to have ecstatic visions and this was perhaps more prevalent after the reception of the Eucharist and during the Via Crucis. But it was on 25 July 1804 that she received the stigmata on each hand as well as her feet and side. The wounds on her feet caused her the difficulties of walking. Her spiritual advisor was the Capuchin Carlo Francesco Zanini from 1800 to his own death.

Gardi died in 1837 in Imola of an edema and was buried in the Church of the Observance. It was Cardinal Giovanni Maria Mastai-Ferretti – the future Pope Pius IX – who affixed the inscription on her tomb.

== Beatification process ==
Preliminary local investigations began on 9 February 1912. The beatification process commenced under Pope John Paul II on 4 April 1995 which accorded Gardi the title Servant of God. The process saw documentation being gathered in order to record her life and her virtues which were integral to the cause. It closed in Imola under the direction of Bishop Giuseppe Fabiani in a special Mass. The Positio was later submitted to the Congregation for the Causes of Saints in 1999.
