= Cecilia del Nacimiento =

Spanish writer (1570–1646)

Madre Cecilia del Nacimiento OCD
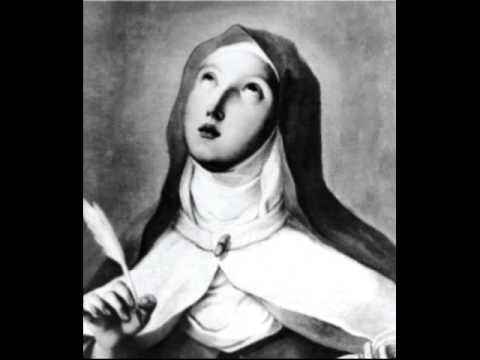

Personal life
- Born: Cecilia Sobrino Morillas; 1570 Valladolid, Spain
- Died: 1646 (aged 75–76)

Religious life
- Religion: Roman Catholic
- Order: Discalced Carmelites
- Monastic name: Cecilia del Nacimiento
- Profession: Nun; mystic; writer; poet

Madre Cecilia del Nacimiento (OCD) (née Cecilia Sobrino Morillas; 1570–1646) was a Spanish nun, mystic, writer, and poet influenced by the Carmelites, of which she became prioress. A Discalced Carmelite and abbess, her work is written in verse and prose and, mainly, it is a mystical production, based on her spiritual experiences. Her production included Romance (poesía) (romantic poetry), a type of poem characteristic of the Spanish, Iberian, and Latin American literary tradition, glosses, Christmas carols, redondilla, limericks, and theatrical work within the convent. Both Cecilia and her older sister, Madre María Sobrino Morillas (religious name, María de San Alberto), copyists and archivists of manuscripts in their convent.

== Early life and education ==
Cecilia Sobrino Morillas was born in Valladolid in 1570. Her parents were Antonio Sobrino, a descendent of the Sobrinos of Braganza family and secretary of the University of Valladolid, and Cecilia Morillas (1539-1581). Cecilia del Nacimiento was the youngest of nine siblings: seven boys and two girls. Four of them professed with the Carmelites, including Cecilia herself, adopting the name of Cecilia del Nacimiento for her spiritual life. It was with the Carmelites in Valladolid that she professed her spiritual life. The chronicler of her life was Friar Diego de San José, her brother, who was also not only in charge of chronicling Cecilia's life but also of her entire family.

The person in charge of Cecilia's education was her mother, a Christian woman with a strong humanistic background, who taught Cecilia to write and read Spanish and Latin. Cecilia received instruction in biblical texts, painting, and music. After the death of her mother, Cecilia continued her musical studies at the Monastery of Santa María la Real de las Huelgas, Valladolid.

== Career ==
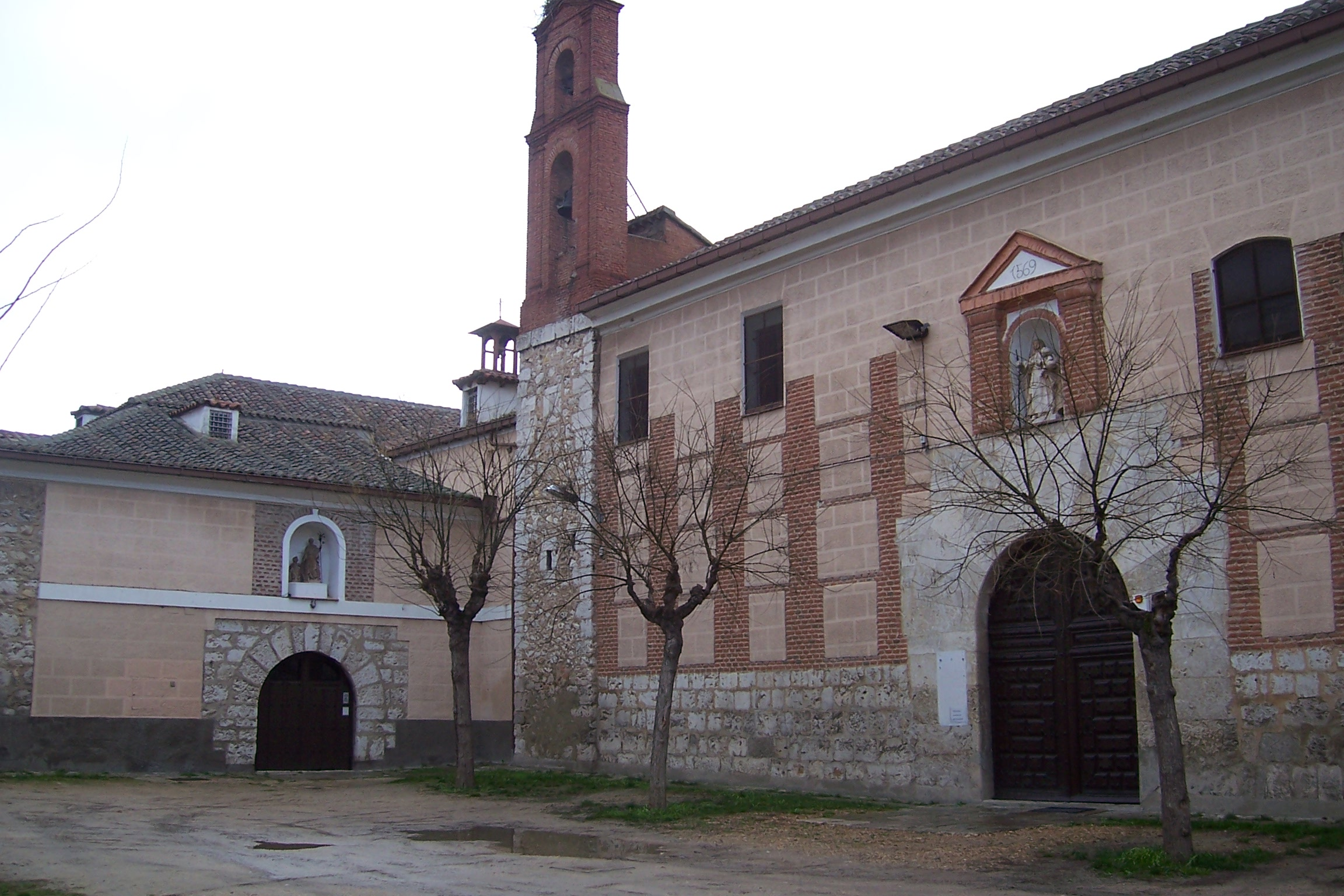
Convento Santa Teresa, Valladolid

On February 2, 1589, she professed with her sister María in the Convent of Santa Teresa, Valladolid, the fourth reformed convent founded by Saint Teresa of Ávila. Cecilia was considered the right nun to take charge of the Calahorra Convent in La Rioja, where, in the first elections, she obtained the position of prioress. During her tenure, she not only based herself on the spiritual life of the convent, but she also opted for the intellectual life just as her mother had taught her. This was so much the case that one of her disciples, Sor Ana de la Trinidad, managed to become an expert in painting, poetry, mathematics, Latin, and music. Cecilia was unable to complete her three-year mandate due to illness; however, she was again named prioress in November 1608.

As a Carmelite writer and poet, she was influenced by Saint Teresa and by Saint John of the Cross. The first to notice Cecilia's intellectual capacity was Manuel de San Jerónimo who mentions Cecilia and her sister in one of her works, saying that "las tengo por dos de las más ilustres religiosas de la Reforma" ("I consider them two of the most illustrious reform nuns").

Cecilia wrote of her spiritual experiences. In this way, she imitates John of the Cross. However, there are those who maintain that the nun was not only influenced by this saint but that she experienced feminine creativity, driven by the ideas of her own mother. The writings, in verse and prose, were similar in style to that of John of the Cross; "Transformación del alma en Dios" is an example of one of the nun's theological-spiritual compositions. Despite these influences, the nun's poetic work followed several trends, all of them initiated by Saint Teresa: "recuento metafórico de sus experiencias místicas y los poemas ocasionales para varios acontecimientos, incluyendo la celebración de la santa de Ávila" ("metaphorical recounting of her mystical experiences and occasional poems for various events, including the celebration of the Saint of Ávila").

Copies of two of her works, Cántico espiritual and La Noche Oscura, are held in the convent of Valladolid. Both writings date from the late 16th century. Her biography also still remains. Her production also includes works of a historical nature. These were not published in her journal, and only allusion to them is included in her letters. Most of the characteristics of the nun are revealed in her letters, particularly mysticism, although they are few compared to the letters that were provided by other nuns. While there are more than 400 of the latter, only nine are known to be written directly by Cecilia. Correspondence with her brother is revealed in them and this provides an understanding of the nun's poetic work as he was Cecilia's theologian and mystic.

== Legacy ==
Manuel de San Jerónimo's biography of Cecilia was based on the writings of María de San Alberto, Cecilia's sibling and convent partner.

== Selected works ==
- La transformación del alma de dios
- Definición del amor
- Al espíritu santo
- Philomena (atribuida erróneamente a San Buenaventura)

=== Romantic poetry ===
- Romance al nacimiento.
- Romance del santísimo sacramento.
- A santa Teresa.

=== Glosses ===
- Glosa (total, 5)
- El Infante que desciende, Niño, si cuando nacéis y Vivo sin vivir en mí.

=== Christmas carols ===
- Otro para brizar al niño Jesús.
- Segundo villancico a Santa Teresa

=== Redondillas and limericks ===
- Letras sobre los nombres de cristo.
- La gitana.

=== Convent theater ===
- Festecica para una profesión religiosa
