= Flower A. Newhouse =

American spiritual teacher (1909–1994)

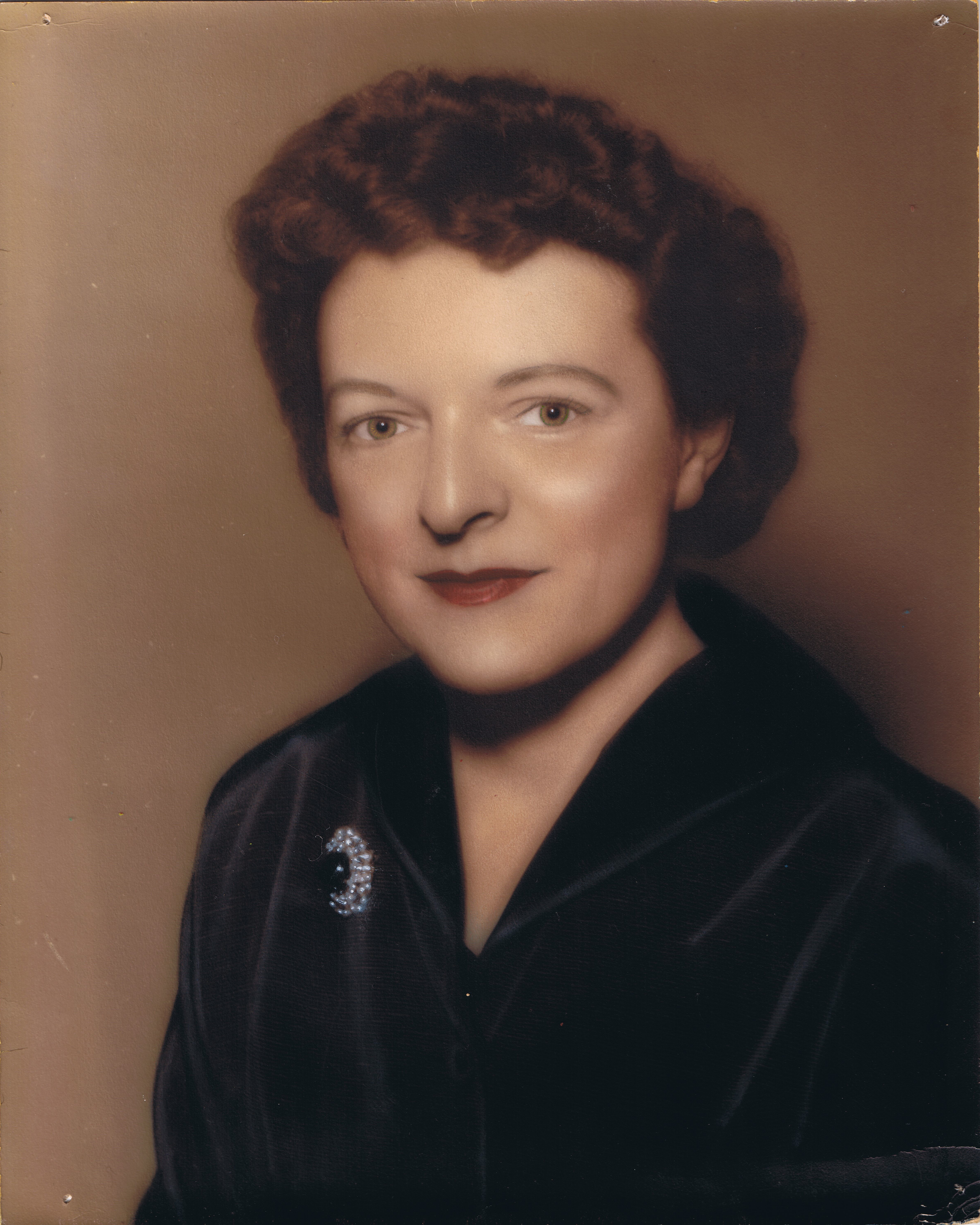
- Newhouse in 1952
- Born: Mildred Arlene Sechler; May 10, 1909; Allentown, Pennsylvania, U.S.
- Died: July 8, 1994 (aged 85)

Flower Arlene Newhouse (May 10, 1909 – July 8, 1994) was an American Christian mystic and spiritual teacher.

== Early life ==
Newhouse was born Mildred "Mimi" Arlene Sechler in Allentown, Pennsylvania on May 10, 1909. She claimed she had the gift of clairvoyance from age 6.

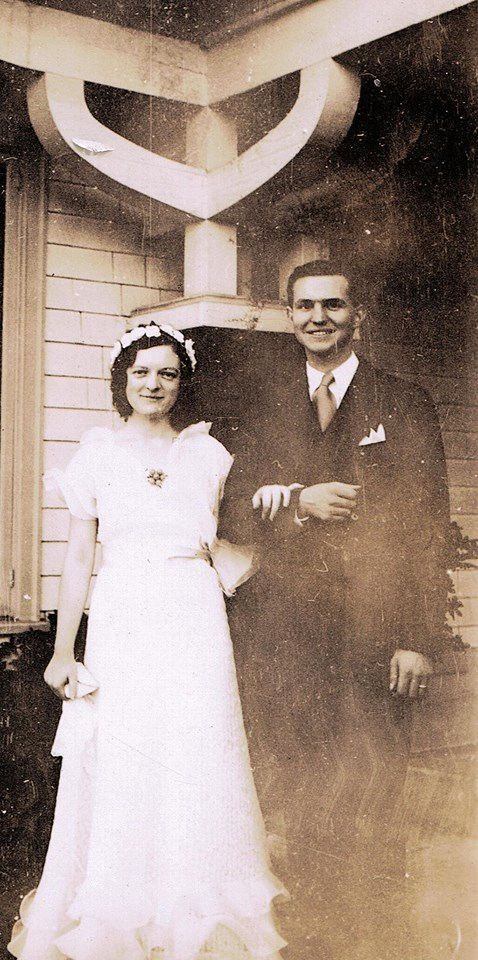
At the wedding of Lawrence and Flower Newhouse, circa 1933

== Career ==
In 1924, Newhouse, along with her mother and sister moved to Los Angeles. Newhouse soon became a guest speaker at a number of churches and lecture halls.

Newhouse's work emphasized the purpose of life is to ascend in consciousness to directly experience oneness with the infinite creative consciousness of God through the living of Christ-love and divine union. It was said of Flower Newhouse in 1947 that she was "one of the outstanding Christian mystics of our time" who authored several books. Flower described mysticism as the practice of the art of divine conscious union with God and is the endeavor of the soul to draw nearer to God through the path of reverence and love into the citadel of enlightenment.

She began traveling regularly to Santa Barbara and San Francisco, and eventually throughout the United States and Canada as an invited speaker. Flower became a nationally known lecturer on topics of esoteric Christian mysticism, presenting in most major U.S. cities and several others. On one of these lecture engagements, she met her future husband, Lawrence George Newhouse (July 18, 1910 - January 29, 1963), whom she married on October 31, 1933.

In 1940, Newhouse and her husband founded Questhaven Retreat and nature preserve, and the Christward Ministry (640 acres in northern San Diego county - presently 655 acres). Her ministry was a hybrid theology drawing on Christian mysticism. Her followers describe her teachings as "not doctrine, but a practical guide to the direct, immediate experience of God."
