= The Order of Christ Sophia =

Organization based on Christian mysticism

The Order of Christ Sophia (OCS) is an organization that was founded in 1999, went through a major reorganization in 2012 and was disbanded in 2017. The OCS described itself as a holy order and spiritual school that offers training in the doctrines of Christian mysticism. The OCS shares beliefs with two very distinct movements, Christian Science and the New Thought denomination Unity, both of which developed in the mid-to-late 19th century.

The OCS asserted an apostolic succession through Mother Clare Watts stating that they received a transmission of teachings and spiritual authority from teacher to student, beginning with Jesus and passing down through the generations to their present-day leaders. This apostolic succession is not part of the historical episcopate as preserved in the Roman, Anglican, Orthodox, and some other churches. However, there are structural similarities and the OCS may be classed as part of the Independent Sacramental Movement.

OCS tenets include the belief that Jesus was not only a redeemer and savior, but also a model for human functioning; and that his mother, Mary, was a representation of the divine feminine and was equal to Jesus in redemptive and mediation powers. OCS doctrine holds that human beings are souls which are in a continuing process of perfecting through the cumulative experience of multiple lives on earth. This perfecting is said to be accomplished through a process of spiritual direction, meditation, prayer, regular participation in the Christian sacraments, emotional healing, and spiritual initiations.

The OCS has centers in seven states which they refer to as Centers of Light and has a minister offering classes in Montreal, Canada. Each Center of Light is run by ordained members of OCS who wear street clothes along with a minister's cross on a ribbon. The Centers of Light are the central location for classes, services, and individual counseling in that state.

== History ==
Mother Clare Watts was raised by missionary parents in Zurich, Switzerland. She lived in yoga ashrams and a Sufi training school along with her husband and children before beginning her training with Father Peter Bowes, with whom she later co-founded the OCS. While living in Kentucky she was ordained a Deacon in 1984 in a mystical Christian order called the Brotherhood of Christ. Though she had been baptized by sisters in the Holy order of mans in 1977, she was never a member of that organization. She and her family moved to Boston in 1985 in order to receive further spiritual training by Master John Hartman. Master John was ordained in the Brotherhood of Christ and continued to teach after the Brotherhood’s dissolution. Watts trained for the priesthood with Master John but was not ordained until 1996 when she reconnected with Bowes, who trained Watts further and brought her into ordination himself. After her ordination, Watts focused her teachings on the spiritual empowerment of women until 1999, when she joined her growing spiritual center to Bowes’ to create the Order of Christ Sophia. In 2001 Bowes ordained Watts a Master Teacher, and the two shared co-directorship of the new order.

The OCS called their spiritual centers Centers of Light and started such centers in numerous cities across the United States.

Growing rifts between Bowes and Watts regarding ideology and methods of teaching led Bowes to leave the OCS in 2012. He immediately formed a new order called the Ruach Center. About half of the membership and ministers of the former OCS left with the Ruach Center, while other half remained with the OCS. The Ruach Center continues their practices through a less widely marketed congregation, while Watts and the Centers of Light continue to practice and advertise publicly, offering classes and services in Seattle, Minneapolis, Ann Arbor, Cambridge (Massachusetts), New Haven, Denver, Santa Fe and Montreal, Canada. The OCS states that their leadership has since become more inclusive, egalitarian, ecumenical, accepting and embracing of individual choices and all religions and spiritual paths that are based in love and light. The ministers no longer wear clerical garb except for Sunday Services and clothing choices are free and open. Collaborative events and classes are given with other spiritual organizations.

== Doctrine ==
=== Reincarnation ===
OCS teaches that all human souls were created at one time and that each soul was made perfect and in total harmony and unity with the creator God. Doctrine states that God gave human souls an immutable freedom of will. By use of free-will, human beings chose to enter into the experiences of life and death and all that is learned through trial and error. In contrast to the Roman Catholic Church, OCS defines the problem of human tendency to separate from the Love, that is God, as being a developmental stage that all people will eventually pass beyond. Jesus Christ and Mother Mary are considered to be souls much like those of the rest of humanity who from early on in their development chose a path of return to God and were the first to reestablish complete unity with the Creator God. OCS affirms that Jesus Christ was the son of God, but does not assert this state of divinity as a singular event. Rather, they assert that it is one for which every human being is designed. It is understood that through reincarnation, every soul can eventually return to the level of divinity that Jesus Christ and Mother Mary demonstrated.

OCS uses the term karma to describe the accumulation of positive or negative choices on the soul. They assert that Jesus’ taking on the sins of the world was a removal of the accumulated negative karma of the human race. OCS doctrine stresses the importance of the development of inner work and spiritual experiences as the means by which negative patterns can be transformed. They also affirm Jesus’ continuous role as a vehicle through which sin/karma is forgiven and the great blessings that can be obtained by means taking in his body and blood in the form of communion.

=== Prayer ===
OCS defines prayer as a God given tool with which to actively create one’s life and experiences, as well as the most powerful means to come into relationship with God. OCS doctrine asserts that due to the unhindered nature of free will, and the process of karma, human beings are completely responsible for the circumstances in which they live. They teach that through the development of a focused mind, uncluttered desire, and connection with God, one can positively affect and change one’s financial, physical, emotional, relational and spiritual conditions.

In contrast to some New Thought movements, prayer is also used as a devotional tool and is described as a method (along with meditation) by which an aspirant is able to not only speak to God but receive direct revelations and direction from God within. The process called "guidance", by which a person can ask questions in prayer and meditation and receive an answer from God within, is a practice within OCS which is taught to all who want to learn how to open to God's direction in their lives.

=== Student-teacher relationship ===
The student-teacher relationship is one of the defining characteristics of OCS as it is in other major mystical practices, including Sufism and Zen. People attend the Centers at various levels of involvement and are free to choose to come and go as they desire. Those who choose the higher levels of training attend classes and services on a regular basis and also tithe and strive for personal integrity. Students who choose higher involvement are also expected to complete daily spiritual exercises, attend communion daily or as often as possible, fast once a month for world peace, and be willing to learn. In the early years of OCS, all affiliated members took part in the intensive training associated with being a student, but in recent years OCS changed their policy and now invites members to be associated with OCS at various levels of commitment.

OCS suggests that through the process of being counseled and guided by teachers of the spiritual path a person can be helped to raise their consciousness, heal some of their wounds of the past and find their purpose in life. OCS cites the relationship between Jesus and his apostles as the model for the practice of having those who have more experience and knowledge guide those who are less experienced and knowledgeable.

== Holy books ==
=== Bible ===
OCS views the New Testament as their primary but not only mystical text. They affirm that although the New Testament should be viewed within its historical and cultural context, Jesus’ teachings are essentially timeless and perfect. They also believe that the Gospels are written not only as description of the teachings and life of Jesus but as guidebook for the inner spiritual path. They practice Bible contemplation in which they seek to understand the multiple levels on which the gospels were written. This primarily consists of a practice of viewing each character and object in the Bible as representations of a part of themselves. In so doing, they look to understand the inner meaning of the text and therefore be led to greater consciousness.

=== Tree of Life ===
OCS considers the Bible to be their primary source of teachings and the basis for their practice; however they use two other texts regularly. The Tree of Life books are a series of texts used in weekly classes. The Tree of Life was originally compiled and written by Father Paul Blighton and was published in San Francisco. The OCS has updated and revised the lessons from those original forms and uses them as a basis for the cosmology and metaphysical teachings they offer. The text is primarily concerned with the nature of human beings in relationship to God and the cosmos.

=== The Poem of the Man-God ===
The Poem of the Man-God is a series of five books based on Roman Catholic themes written by Maria Valtorta, an Italian nun, in the 1940s. She claimed to have received direct revelations from Christ and Mother Mary about the events and teachings of their time. Each book is over 500 pages long and claims to enumerate the travels, teachings, and activities of Jesus Christ, his Mother Mary, his apostles, and the holy men and women who followed Jesus. OCS reads from this text at communion services and encourages its members to read the texts as well. OCS members believe this text to have some flaws but still be a mostly valuable revelation of Jesus and Mary for its comprehensive elucidation of their lives.

== Practices ==
OCS’s regular practices include daily Communion, evening prayers (in a group setting), thirty minutes of morning meditation, a spiritual exercise performed twice daily for some members, fasting one day each month, classes twice a week, a Sunday service, monthly seminars and bi-annual retreats. They have two classes per week, one which focuses on the Bible and the other on The Tree of Life. In recent times a greater variety of classes has become available and these are taught by a number of different people at each Center. A series of classes on Mystical Prayer, another on Metaphysics and Healing and one on Mindfulness and Healing are all offered on a regular basis. Sunday services consist of thirty minutes of silent meditation, singing, prayers, a scriptural reading, a sermon, and Communion. Services tend to be small and focused on personal transformation and sacramental blessings.

=== Initiations and rites ===
OCS differentiates itself from many other new-age spiritual groups through its personalized training and its initiations and rites. OCS speaks of three major initiations that appear in all major mystical paths, though called by different names. OCS calls these initiations "Mystical baptism", "Illumination" and "Self-Realization". The baptism is public, while the illumination and self-realization are done more privately. Though OCS offers these initiations they also stress that anyone can come to know God with or without initiations.

== Ordination and leadership structure ==
There are three levels of ministry in the OCS. "Ministers" are the first level of ministry and are empowered to baptize, teach classes and lead Sunday Services. "Priests" are empowered to baptize and illumine students and teach most of the classes, lead Sunday services, and act as directors of the Centers of Light. Master Teachers are the highest level of ministry and are empowered to bring students through all three initiations and ordain priests. There are also intermediary training positions before each ordination. Currently, Mother Clare Watts is the only Master Teacher in the OCS but reports that she expects more Master Teachers will be ordained in time.

The OCS ordains female clergy, and one apparent difference between the OCS and traditional Christianity is its acknowledgement of Mother Mary as co-redeemer and equal to Jesus Christ. Perhaps because of this assertion, a major proportion of the OCS’s ministry is female. As religious scholar James R Lewis writes, "women will probably continue to constitute a majority of the membership into the foreseeable future because of the women’s spirituality issues addressed by the Order, and because of the opportunities for females assuming ministerial leadership positions in the organization – opportunities not present in Roman Catholicism and other traditionalist Christian bodies."

== Controversy and criticisms ==
The group first encountered opposition in 2001, when parents of some members became upset with the level of involvement of their adult children and began to suggest that OCS was a “dangerous cult”. Families claimed that OCS had brainwashed its members and had caused sleep deprivation, health problems, emotional turmoil and unhealthy levels of allegiance to the group and its practices. They claimed that OCS had "poisoned" their children against them and had destroyed their once happy families.

Several families staged intensive interventions with their adult children and attempted to convince them of the danger of the group, only a few of which were successful. Fueled by families irate over the "loss" of their adult children to what they considered to be a cult, some online forums sprung up, criticizing the OCS and its leaders. Several journalists investigated the OCS and articles appeared in the Milwaukee Journal Sentinel, The Guardian Observer and The Boston Phoenix.

Much of the ground for controversy died down after the OCS split in 2012. OCS members claim that the order was opened up to greater transparency, to more choices in levels of involvement, and became a more democratic, empowering and supportive organization. Members are referred outside the organization for counseling, are encouraged to have good relationships with families and relatives and to interact with people within and outside of the group.

== OCS response to criticism ==
Watts claims that prior to the order splitting in 2012, too much control was exerted over members' personal lives and choices. She accepts responsibility for her actions that contributed to some members feeling hurt and wronged by this excessive directing of their lives, and offers her remorse and apologies for those choices. She states that the OCS is now an entirely different organization, one in which there is much autonomy, greater self-responsibility and self-direction and which is open, transparent, affirming of all, having its basis in positive support and appreciation of differences. Both Bowes and Watts claim that their own order became more relaxed since the 2012 split.

== Scholarly interest ==
In 2003, sociologist James R. Lewis read an article on OCS that appeared in a Milwaukee newspaper and become interested in the group. Lewis is a professor at the University of Wisconsin, a researcher and an author. His work focuses specifically on new religious movements (NRMs). His books include The Oxford Handbook of New Religious Movements, though the handbook does not explicitly reference the OCS.

His first publication on the group appeared in the Journal of Alternative Spiritualities and New Age Studies and was titled “New data on who joins NRMs and why: A case study of the Order of Christ/Sophia.” In this article he describes the OCS as a "mystery school that trains its members in the doctrines and practices of esoteric Christianity.” In response to allegations of the OCS being a "dangerous cult", Lewis concluded that OCS was experiencing a developmental process typical for NRMs. He contextualized the accusations that OCS was "cult" within a sociological developmental perspective. He reported that there was no indication of psychologically abusive practices or cult-like behaviors. The OCS is also briefly referenced, mainly in regard to its teachings on Mary, in John Plummer's 2005 PhD dissertation, published as The Many Paths of the Independent Sacramental Movement.
