= Catalina de Jesús Herrera =

Ecuadorian nun and writer

Sor Catalina de Jesús Herrera
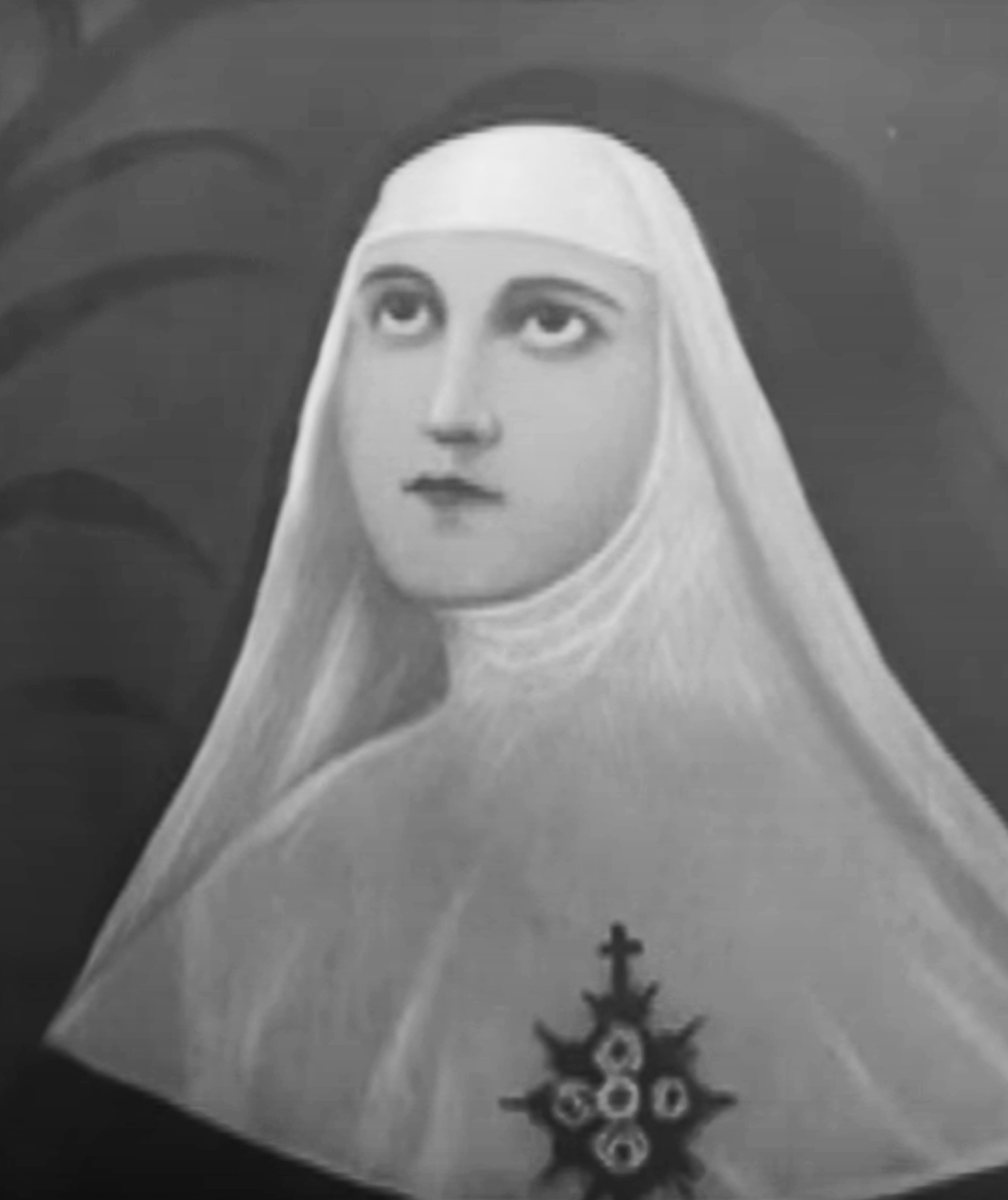

Personal life
- Born: Catalina de Jesús María Herrera Campusano; August 22, 1717 Guayaquil, Ecuador
- Died: September 29, 1795 (aged 78) Quito, Eduador
- Parents: Juan Delfín Herrera Campusano (father); María Navarro Navarrete y Castro (mother)
- Notable work: Secretos entre el alma y Dios

Religious life
- Religion: Roman Catholic
- Order: Dominican Order
- Monastic name: Catalina Luisa de Jesús, María y José
- Profession: Nun; Venerable; writer; mystic

Catalina de Jesús Herrera (religious name, Sor Catalina Luisa de Jesús, María y José; Guayaquil, August 22, 1717 – Quito, September 29, 1795) was an 18th-century Ecuadorian nun and writer. She belonged to the Monastery of Santa Catalina de Siena in Quito. Herrera is categorized as venerable within the Catholic Church due to the multiple miracles and prophecies attributed to her. Her autobiography titled Secretos entre el alma y Dios (Secrets between the soul and God), rewritten in 1760, was published in 1895 in the collection Antología de Proseistas in honor of the centenary of her death. Her mystical poetry was represented in the Real Audiencia of Quito.

== Early life and education ==
Catalina de Jesús María Herrera Campusano was born in Guayaquil on August 22, 1717. Her parents were Juan Delfín Herrera Campusano and María Navarro Navarrete y Castro. Catalina' mother taught her to read and write at the age of seven, and also gave her a religious education. Catalina tells the anecdote about her mother when, at the age of four, after witnessing the birth of a child, Catalina began to reflect on the origin of life, the origin of man and woman. When she asked her mother, she received an answer that was a complete catechesis, starting from God, Creator of all things. Her godfather was Sergeant major Francisco Gantriper. The death of her father in 1728 led to a spiritual change and she acquired the habit of confessing and taking communion every fifteen days. She was devoted to Our Lady of the Rosary and entered the third Dominican Order of the convent of San Pablo Apóstol in Guayaquil with the help of Fray Carlos García de Bustamante.

Characterized by being curious and intellectual, Herrera was very interested in culture. Dedicating herself to reading books, her favorite genre was "comedies" according to what she says in her writings. She also read Teresa of Ávila, John of the Cross, and other exponents of mysticism and moral theology. It was her brother, a Dominican friar, who advised her to abandon frivolous reading and dedicate herself to other, more profound works.

== Career ==
She traveled to Quito in 1741 to enter the Monastery of Santa Catalina de Siena, adopting the religious name of "Catalina Luisa de Jesús, María y José". In 1745, Herrera was assigned the role of Mistress of Novices and by 1755, she held the position of Mother Prioress. Herrera served as a depositary, according to the documents from the Monastery Archive compiled in 1771, and again from 1783 to 1785. She served as prioress from 1786 to 1788. Finally, she would be a depositary again from 1789 to 1792, a few years before her death.

In 1747, she wrote her first autobiography titled Secretos entre el alma y Dios (Secrets between the Soul and God) but upon finishing it, she burned it. Years later, her new confessor, Fray Tomás Corrales, ordered Herrera to write again and she did so. Herrera began this work on February 8, 1758, and finished it on August 29, 1760. Her writings were compiled in 30 booklets made by hand and published in six volumes in 1895, on the centenary of her death. They were published as part of the Biblioteca Ecuatoriana Mínima; seven fragments were reproduced, from the fourth part and the sixty-fourth chapter.

== Death ==
Herrera died on September 29, 1795, at the age of 78, and was buried in the same convent where she lived.
