= Lilian Staveley =

British writer (1871–1928)

Lilian Louise Staveley (1871–1928) was a Christian writer and mystic whose anonymous works have only been credited to her after her death.

== Early life ==
Lilian Louise Staveley (née Bowdoin) was the daughter of James Bowdoin (1811–1897) and his wife Charlotte Kate (née Costobadie) (1839–1920). Lilian was born to an affluent family, descended on both sides from Huguenots of the old French nobility. Her early life was not one of outward religious observance, but was rather one of privilege and learning. Along with two brothers, she was educated by tutors, governesses, and at boarding schools. She spoke four languages fluently and spent her summers in Italy.

I was worshipping the Beautiful without giving sufficient thought to Him from Whom all beauty proceeds. Half a lifetime was to go by before I realized to what this habit was leading me—that it was the first step towards the acquirement of that most exquisite of all blessings—the gift of the Contemplation of God.

As a young woman she became an atheist; a painful decision with which she struggled for two years.

My intelligence said, "Resign yourself to what is, after all, the truth: console yourself with the world and material achievements." The heart said, "Resignation is impossible, for there is no consolation to the heart without God." I listened to my heart rather than my intelligence, and for two terrible years I fought for faith.

While in Rome, visiting the temples, she was moved by the beauty of her surroundings and "a longing for her Lord so painfully real that the longing could not be denied".

While she was highly sought after and offered many proposals, she entered into a secret engagement with Brigadier General William Cathcart Staveley but her parents refused, due to his lack of money, to allow the romance. Meanwhile, her father, with whom she was quite close, suffered from a heart condition that left him gravely ill for two years before his eventual death in 1897. His death had a profound impact on his daughter. "I became a semi-invalid, always suffering, too delicate to marry." When her health returned, she married Staveley on 30 September 1899 at Kensington, London though they were quickly separated for a time when he left for the Anglo-Boer War.

At the end of the First World War she brought to John M. Watkins of London a manuscript. For the sake of her privacy and because her husband was still living and a general in the Army, she insisted on anonymity.

She died in Dorset in 1928.

It was only after her death that General Staveley learned that his wife of nearly thirty years had led a hidden spiritual life.

== Writings ==
Staveley's writings are notable for their unassuming style - being the personal narrative of one person's spiritual journey - at once deeply personal and humble. It is the journey not of an unusual person; rather it is the progress of a self-described "ordinary soul" possessing, however, extraordinary love for God.

== Anonymity ==
The three books that appeared in her lifetime were all anonymously published; keeping the "white-heat" of her "spirit-living" a secret from the world, even from her husband. It is only later that her works were published under her name.

== The feminine principle ==
One of the dilemmas that Staveley struggled with was that of the 'feminine principle'. She saw across history and religion a tendency by those in religious power, by men who were otherwise great and holy, to look down on womankind. She feared that in God's eyes also she was not of the 'acceptable sex'. This apparent disparagement she could not understand: "What profound injustice — to suffer so much and to receive no recognition whatever whilst men walked off with all the joys after leading very questionable lives!" For several years her shame at being a woman was such that, although she continued to believe in and pay homage to God, she could do so only with a certain reverent sadness, and not with love.

Almighty God, if it is Thy Will to blot out Woman from Paradise I most humbly assure Thee of this—Man will miss her sorely; and Thou Thyself, Almighty God, when Thou dost visit Paradise, wilt miss her also!

Eventually, Staveley came to the conclusion that, the arrogance of certain men aside; "Clothed in the body of either man or woman, the soul is predominantly feminine — the Feminine Principle beloved of, and returning to, the Eternal Masculine of God." The spiritual journey of each soul is a journey shared alike by man and by woman.

== Legacy ==
In his book Modern Mystics (London: John Murray, 1935; reprinted New York: University Books, 1970), Sir Francis Younghusband, a writer, diplomat and Himalayan explorer, explicitly compares Staveley with the likes of Ramakrishna and St. Therese de Lisieux. Younghusband also points out that the spiritual experiences Staveley describes bear "remarkable resemblances to the experiences of Hindu mystics".

Her writings were also known to Evelyn Underhill, a respected authority on comparative mysticism, as well as to Frithjof Schuon, a pre-eminent writer in the Perennialist school of comparative religion.

== Books ==
During her lifetime, Staveley published three books:

- The Prodigal Returns (John M. Watkins, 1921)
- The Romance of the Soul (John M. Watkins, 1920)
- The Golden Fountain or, the Soul’s Love for God: Being Some Thoughts and Confessions of one of His Lovers (John M. Watkins, 1919; reprinted by World Wisdom Books, 1982).

A later compilation of her writings is

- A Christian Woman's Secret (World Wisdom Books, 2008)
