= William Johnston (priest) =

Irish Jesuit priest (1925–2010)

The Reverend Father William Johnston SJ
- Title: The Reverend Father

Personal life
- Born: William Johnston; 30 July 1925 Belfast, Northern Ireland
- Died: 12 October 2010 (aged 85) Tokyo, Japan
- Flourished: Mid–late 20th century
- Home town: Belfast
- Notable work(s): Christian Zen: A Way of Meditation, Silent Music: The Science of Meditation, The Still Point: Reflections on Zen and Christian Mysticism, Mystical Theology: The Science of Love
- Education: University of Liverpool; University College Dublin; Sophia University
- Known for: Interfaith dialogue between Christianity and Buddhism; writings on Zen and Christian mysticism

Religious life
- Religion: Christianity
- Denomination: Roman Catholic
- Order: Society of Jesus
- Institute: Sophia University
- Church: Roman Catholic Church
- Philosophy: Christian mysticism; interfaith dialogue between Christianity and Zen Buddhism
- School: Jesuit
- Profession: Priest; author; theologian
- Ordination: 24 March 1957
- Initiation: 20 September 1943; Tullabeg, County Laois

Senior posting
- Teacher: Yamada Koun Roshi
- Based in: Japan
- Period in office: 20th–21st century
- Initiated: Entered Jesuit novitiate on 20 September 1943 at Tullabeg, County Laois

William Johnston (30 July 1925 — 12 October 2010) was a Jesuit priest and a Zen meditation advocate from Belfast, Northern Ireland. Johnson identified as a Catholic mystic in the tradition of John of the Cross but one who had incorporated meditative practices learnt from study of Zen Buddhism.

== Biography ==
=== United Kingdom and Ireland ===
William Johnston was born in Belfast on July 30th, 1925. He was the youngest of four sons of William Johnston, a civil servant, and his wife Winnie (née Clearkin). His family were supporters of the Irish Republican Army and his mother was a member of Cumann na mBan. Johnston grew up on the Falls Road and attended the Dominican convent. In 1932, his family moved to Holyhead, Wales, and later to Aigburth, Liverpool. In 1940, Johnston returned to Belfast, where he attended St Malachy's College. In 1943, he entered the Jesuit novitiate at Emo Court, County Laois in the Republic of Ireland.

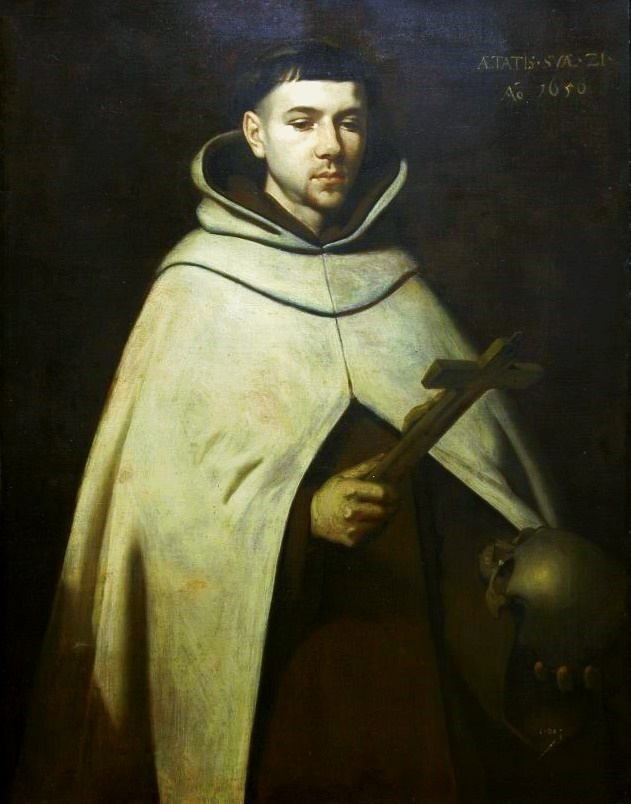
An early influence upon Johnson was the mysticism of John of the Cross.

Johnston studied classics at University College Dublin, where he earned first-class honours, and also attended Liverpool University. In 1948, he began studying philosophy at St Stanislaus College in Tullabeg, County Offaly. While there, he sought guidance from an older priest nicknamed "Cap" due to his habit of wearing a skull cap. Cap, who had experienced what Johnston described as "infused contemplation", advised Johnston to engage in silent, wordless contemplative prayer, while also maintaining his regular devotional practices. Around this time, Johnston encountered the writings of Christian mystic John of the Cross, which had a lasting impact on his spiritual outlook. As he recalled: "From St. John of the Cross I learned the signs of a genuine call to contemplation. These are that one is unable to think during prayer (or, at least, has great difficulty in doing so), that one cannot fix one’s imagination on a particular object, that one wants to be alone in loving awareness of God." Reflecting later, Johnston added: "But it was only much later that I came to understand the ‘all and nothing’ and the coincidence of opposites and so many points in St. John of the Cross that resemble Buddhism".

Inspired by John of the Cross' practice of contemplation, Johnston chose to focus his master's thesis on the subject of contemplation in Aristotle. He proposed that Aristotle's philosophy contained a mystical dimension, remarking: "He spoke of moments when the human person seems like God—and then returns to his ordinary self." Despite this original interpretation, his professors were not impressed and initially rejected the thesis. Later, he reworked the entire piece in a more conventional academic style, noting: "I rewrote the whole thing in a dull, academic style. It was then accepted. The lesson I learned for myself and for my future students was: don’t write attractively if you want your thesis accepted." This experience laid the foundation for his later doctoral thesis on The Cloud of Unknowing.

=== Japan ===
Johnston joined the Jesuit Order and in 1951 was assigned to postwar Japan, joining the Jesuit community at Taura. After two years of learning Japanese, he joined the staff of Sophia University, Tokyo, to teach English.

Johnston studied theology at Shakujii and became interested in mysticism, Zen Buddhism, and inter-religious understanding. He was ordained a priest in March 1957 after completing his studies. In 1958, he spent six months in Rome, an experience he later described as “nothing short of a revolution” in his life. He then studied at the Lumen Vitae catechetical institute in Brussels, where he deeply engaged with mysticism, including traditions like transcendental meditation. While in Belgium, Johnston deepened his practice of silent, vertical contemplative prayer and encountered the psychological theories of Carl Jung. Although he did not identify as a Jungian, Johnston was significantly influenced by Jung's concept of the psyche as composed of multiple layers, containing both positive and negative elements that must be acknowledged and integrated.

After a short period ministering in a New York parish, he returned to Japan in 1960 and resumed teaching at Sophia University. His doctoral thesis (published in 1978 as The Mysticism of the Cloud of Unknowing) is considered his most significant work.

Johnston earned a doctorate in mystical theology from Sophia University, Tokyo, and carried out specific studies on Buddhism. Influenced heavily by Jesuit priest Hugo Enomiya-Lassalle, he actively participated in the dialogue between Zen Buddhism and Christianity. Johnston also studied Zen with Heinrich Dumoulin.

Johnston was influenced by Shigeto Oshida and later practised Zen under the guidance of Yamada Koun but insisted on continuing to recite the Jesus Prayer despite Yamada's contrary instructions, which ended the master-disciple relationship.

As the 1960s continued, Johnston progressed in his spiritual journey, and he began to view the path of Ignatius of Loyola as harmonising with that of John of the Cross: “I began to see in St. Ignatius a mysticism that was the same as that of John of the Cross and also different. Whereas John of the Cross loved the silence of the desert, Ignatius loved the mighty cities. Both John of the Cross and Ignatius of Loyola entered into mystical prayer, one to be united with God in silence, the other to work for the salvation of the world.” Johnston later came to understand the intellectual, moral, and religious transformations outlined by Bernard Lonergan as ultimately leading to mysticism. On one occasion in Boston, he met Lonergan in person: “I told him that his understanding of religious conversion leading to being in love is in fact a way to mysticism. He was delighted and smiled, saying, ‘Yes, that’s it!".

Johnston translated Endo Shusaku's novel Chinmoku, which was published in English as Silence in 1969. Some of his colleagues were offended because the novel's main character was a Jesuit apostate. Despite this, his translation received high praise. As his reputation expanded, he was invited to preach and teach internationally, visiting countries such as the US, UK, Australia, China, and the Philippines. He also made several trips back to Ireland. In his autobiography, Mystical Journey (2006), he discussed his belief that all religions should work together in peace.

Johnston's reflections on his background in Northern Ireland, his transition to Japan and the practice of Zen, are about how the relationship of Catholicism and Zazen meditation can transform Ireland, Japan, Zen Buddhism, and Christian mysticism. Toward the end of his life, influenced by the Japanese experience of bombing of civilian populations and his understanding of the Buddha and Christ's teachings, he embraced the active promotion of nonviolence.

== Identity ==
As a Catholic born in Northern Ireland, Johnson identified throughout his life as Irish rather than British. Johnson compared his experience to Abhishiktananda, whose experiences in India only intensified his feelings of being French; likewise, Johnson's time in Japan, he said, only strengthened his feelings of being Irish.
