= Heilwige Bloemardinne =

Christian mystic (1265?–1335)

- Born: 1265?
- Died: 23 August 1335
- Known for: Christian mysticism

Heilwige Bloemardinne (1265? – 23 August 1335) was a Christian mystic who lived in Brussels and was loosely associated with the Brethren of the Free Spirit. She was also known as Heilwijch Blomart and Bloemardine.

She was the daughter of a wealthy merchant, Wilhelm Bloemart, one of the most consistently powerful figures in the municipal government of Brussels. She is differentiated from earlier teachers such as Aleydis (executed, Cambrai, 1236) or Marguerite Porete (executed, Paris, 1310) by the support she enjoyed from the secular authorities which made her untouchable by the Inquisition. Some idea of her prestige is given by the fact that, on her death, the silver chair upon which she sat when instructing disciples was given to the Duchess of Brabant. This chair was popularly believed to possess miraculous powers derived from its association with her. According to Professor Cohn she was popularly revered as a living saint.

She is known to have written a book because John of Ruysbroeck also known as John of Ruusbroec attacked it calling by it heretical, but no copy seems to have survived. Ruysbroeck does not bring himself to refer to her by name but calls her Pseudo-Hadewijch. One view is that John of Ruysbroeck's time as a priest in Brussels was brought to an end by being driven out by supporters of Bloemardinne. These grounds for personal animosity make it hard to know if the views he attributes to her are fairly stated.

The view that can most confidently be attributed to her is the doctrine of seraphic love - that melting into God is a possibility and that a blissful foretaste of paradise is available to the earth-bound. "At the head of the sect in Brussels was a certain woman, who excited such admiration among the people that they believed that two seraphim accompanied her when she approached the Holy Table." Accusations that this spilled over into incitement to sensual indulgence were levied at Bloemardinne or those who claimed to follow her.

Another view which Ruysbroeck attributes to her followers is that of complete passivity before God. "Thus they are poor in spirit for they are without will of any sort having forsaken everything and making no choices of their own." This has echoes of Marguerite Porete's annihilation of souls. Another similarity to Porete may be the method of disseminating her views among the population. If Ruysbroeck's attacks are accurate, Bloemardinne produced pamphlets which acted as teaching summaries from which travelling teachers could expound these lessons to the poor. Parts of the Mirror of Simple Souls read as if they began with this purpose in mind, particularly as the words 'reader' and 'hearer' are used indiscriminately.

Heilwige Bloemardinne seems to be developing a tradition started more conservatively by Beatrice of Nazareth of whom it was said, "in all her deeds and thoughts, she neither feared nor was in awe of men, nor devil, nor angel, nor even divine judgment."

The movement spread and seems to have inspired Jeanne Dabenton who led the "Society of the Poor" in Paris and was executed there around 1372.
