= Ursula de Jesus =

Peruvian Catholic mystic

Ursula de Jesus (1604–1668) was an Afro-Peruvian Catholic mystic.

== Biography ==
She was born in Lima, Peru, and was the legitimate daughter of Juan Castilla and Isabel de los Rios. Isabel de los Rios was an African slave, leaving Ursula to inherit her mother's status. She lived under her mother's owner, Gerònima de los Rios, until she was roughly eight years old. Ursula's first experience with mysticism was when she became the property of Luisa de Melgarejo Sotomayor, a mystic and beata (pious laywoman) in Lima. In 1617 she went to the Convent of Santa Clara in Lima as the donada (slave) of Ines del Pulgar, a 16-year-old novice and the niece of the woman who owned Ursula's parents. She labored as a slave for 43 of her 62 years.

In 1642 Ursula was known to have a reputation of vanity within the convent and liked to dress well. Ursula saw herself as self-centered, temperamental and vain. She lent a skirt to someone as a favor and they returned it to her soiled. Ursula was eager to wash the skirt as soon as she possibly could. She went to the well to wash it and the platform on which she stood over the well collapsed, leaving Ursula suspended by her own grip and holding on to her life. She prayed to the Virgin of Carmel to rescue her. Miraculously, she was able to regain balance and enough leverage to reach safety. This was her testimonial awakening. This near-death experience lead Ursula to change her materialistic views and habits, causing her to devote her life to spirituality and devote herself God.

For the remainder of her life, Ursula sought a life of religious spirituality. In 1645 one of the nuns of the convent purchased her freedom. Although she was denied the ability to become a nun because of her race, she remained at the convent as a donada. She stated that she experienced divine visions, particularly with the souls in purgatory who sought her intercession to gain their release. Ursula was notable for her mystical visions and her claims of communicating with the souls of those who died and went to purgatory. She felt she had the ability to do so because of her near-death experience.

A diary of her visions and life experiences was created between 1650 and 1661; it was first published in English in 2004. Ursula claimed that nuns in purgatory would contact her. Some of the nuns who she came in contact with told her that they were paying a very painful consequence for their behavior during their life and allegedly answered many of Ursula's questions, saying they should have paid closer attention during Mass rather than spreading gossip and negotiating business. They believed Ursula's prayers might alleviate their suffering in purgatory.

In her journal, Ursula recorded complaints about the demanding nuns and how she was spat on and ridiculed. She endured an excessive amount of work and chores compared to the pampered nuns. Despite the fact that Ursula completely devoted herself to serving God after being freed from slavery, she was never able to come out of the hovering shadow of discrimination. She was still treated differently for her African descent and dark complexion. Oftentimes she showed her vulnerability in her diary when she questioned God why she had to be the one who suffered:

Frequently I asked my God why do I have to be the one to work excessively long hours? He reminded me of the excruciating suffering that He endured during the Passion. I stated that if it were not for Him I would not persevere in this, He responded that although the Son of God was quite well off in His kingdom of Glory, He came to suffer and travail for our sake.

Towards the end of her life, Ursula was sure she would be granted a direct and safe passage to Heaven because of her selfless efforts and her self-sacrificing ways. Ursula died on February 23, 1666. A nun by the name of doña Leonor Basques, a well-respected nun, declared her death should be seen as a "good death" and stated that Ursula indeed entered Heaven by preparing her will, disposing of worldly possessions; she also confessed her sins and received extreme unction.

== See also ==
- Catholic Church in Peru
- Religious experience
