= Guigo =

Guigo is a given name. Notable people with the name include:

- Guigo (bishop of Girona) (r. 908–938);
- Guigo I (1083–1136), Carthusian monk;
- Guigo II (died 1188 or 1193), Carthusian monk;
- Guigo de Ponte (died 1297), Carthusian monk;
- Guigo de Cabanas (13th century), troubadour.

== See also ==
- Guigues
