= Guigues =

Guigues may refer to:

== Nobility ==
- Guigues I of Albon, count of Oisans, Grésivaudan, and Briançonnais
- Guigues II of Albon
- Guigues III of Albon, also Guigues the Old, count of Albon
- Guigues IV of Albon, count of Albon
- Guigues V of Albon, count of Albon and Grenoble
- Guigues VI of Viennois, dauphin of Vienne
- Guigues VII of Viennois, dauphin of Vienne
- Guigues VIII of Viennois, dauphin of Vienne
- Guigues I of Forez
- Guigues II of Forez
- Guigues III of Forez
- Guigues IV of Forez, count of Forez, Auxerre and Tonnerre
- Guigues V of Forez
- Guigues VI of Forez
- Guigues VII of Forez
- Guigues (viscount of Lyon)
- Guigues of Forcalquier, count

== Other notable people ==
- Guigues I (bishop of Valence)
- Guigues I of Chartreuse, prior
- Guigues II of Chartreuse, prior
- Guigues du Pont (died 1297), Carthusian monk
- Guigues Guiffrey (born 1497), French soldier
- Joseph-Bruno Guigues (1805-1874), Oblate priest

== Places ==
- Saint-Bruno-de-Guigues, often shortened to Guigues, Quebec, Canada
- Saint-Eugène-de-Guigues, Quebec, Canada

== See also ==
- Guigo
