= John of St. Samson =

French friar and mystic (1571–1636)

Venerable John of Saint Samson O.Carm
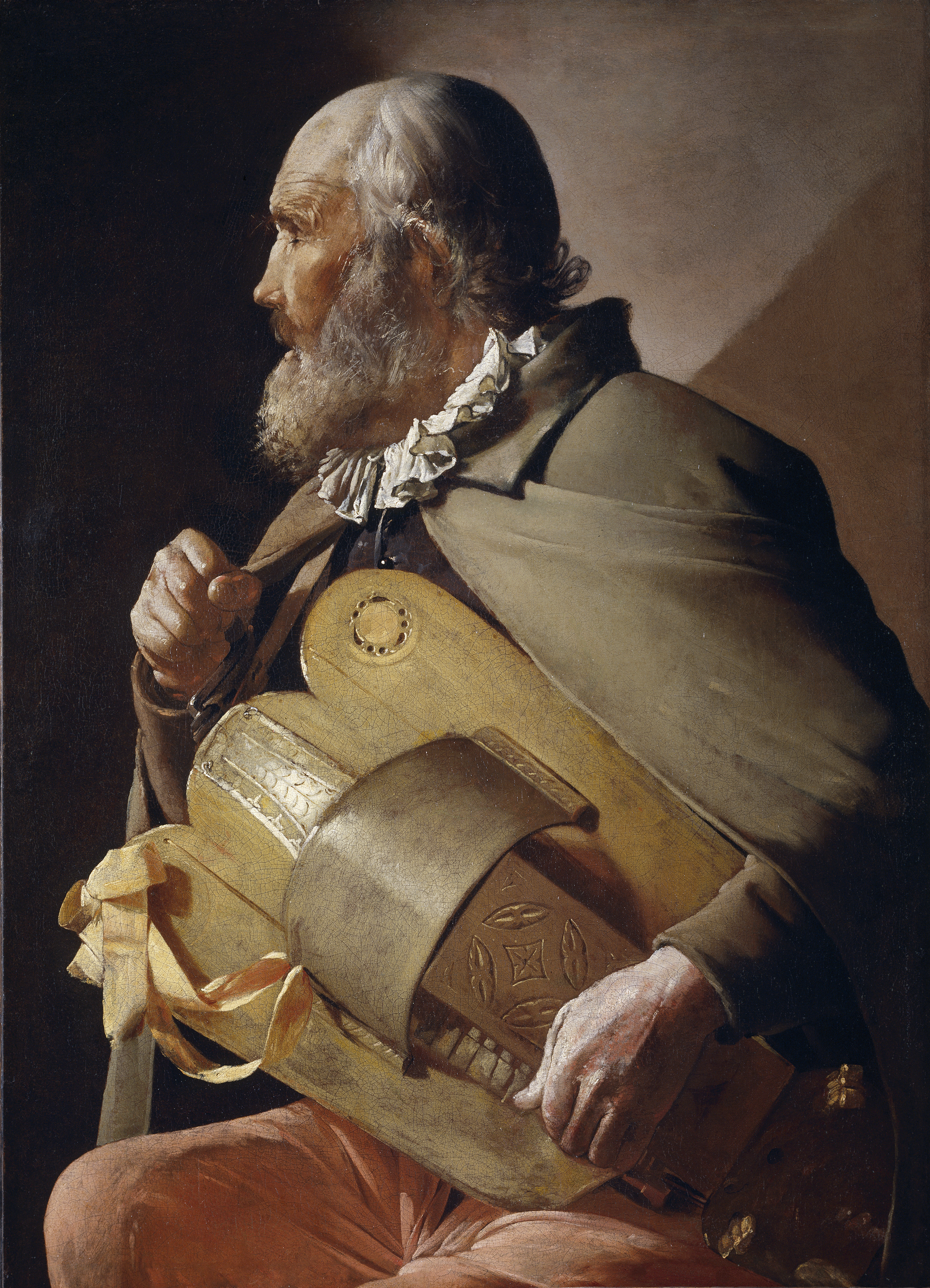
- "You and I, my love, you and I, you and I, and never another nor more!"

Religious
- Born: 29 December 1571; Sens, Yonne, France
- Died: 14 September 1636 (aged 64); Rennes, Ille-et-Vilaine, France
- Venerated in: Roman Catholic Church
- Feast: January 21

John of St. Samson (1571–1636), also known as Jean du Moulin or Jean de Saint-Samson, was a French Carmelite friar and mystic of the Catholic Church. He is known as the soul of the Touraine Reform of the Carmelite Order, which stressed prayer, silence and solitude. John was blind from the age of three after contracting smallpox and receiving poor medical treatment for the disease. He insisted very strongly on the mystical devotion of the Carmelites. He has been referred to as the "French John of the Cross" by students of Christian mysticism.

== Early life ==
John Moulin was born in 1571 in Sens into a middle-class family. He lost his sight at the age of 3 after contracting smallpox, and more so due to a botched attempt to cure the disease. His Father, Pierre de Moulin, was an assessor of taxes, and his mother, Marie d'Aiz descended from a noble family. Tragically, at the age of 10, his parents died, leaving him orphaned.

John was taken in by his maternal uncle Zachary d'Aiz. He received a good education, learning Latin and being introduced to French Literature. He was impressed by the poetry of Pierre de Ronsard, and even wrote sonnets in imitation of him, before regretting and reproaching himself for such vanity. He enjoyed having spiritual works read aloud to him; he preferred the Lives of the Saints, The Imitation of Christ, The Institutes of Johannes Tauler, but his favorite book was a work titled the Mantlet of the Spouse by Flemish Franciscan Frans Vervoort, which he memorized nearly word for word, and from where he drew his motto, "With Christ I am nailed to the Cross." John developed his obvious talent for music. At twelve years old he was already playing the organ regularly in a local Dominican church, and he also learned other instruments, including the spinet, the harp, the lute, the flute and the oboe. He admitted that it took no less than 15 minutes to learn the rudiments of any wind instrument.

In 1597, he moved to Paris and lived with his brother John-Baptist, who worked as the secretary to the Gendarmerie of France, and his wife. His brother's younger brother-in-law, Jean Douet, was willing to read spiritual works aloud to him, and he continued to turn from worldly interests to the spiritual life. His brother John-Baptist died in 1601, after which John descended into poverty and depended on the good will of others. For a brief period, John was provided lodging by an Augustinian Canon, M. de Montdidier, but had to spend many hours locked out of the house when Montdidier was away. For a period he lodged at a grocer's, and supported himself by playing organ at churches in the Latin Quarter.

== Entering The Carmelites ==
John began visiting the Carmelite Church at Place Maubert in Paris, attending daily mass and spending hours in prayer before the Blessed Sacrament. On the Feast of St. Anges, January 21, 1604, John asked the Carmelite friar Matheiu Pinault, who usually played the organ at Place Maubert, if he could play in honor of one of his favorite saints, and afterward the two became friends. Soon a group of friars gathered around John and Pinault to read devotional works and learn about prayer and meditation. The Carmelites provided John with lodging in exchange for giving music lessons. Eventually, John asked to join the Carmelites as a lay brother, most especially because of his blindness. He was accepted into the novitiate house in Dol in 1606, and professed vows the following year at the age of 35. He retained his baptismal name, and took the name of St. Samson, the first bishop of Dol.

In Dol, because of the humid climate and insufficient hygiene, epidemics of fevers and pestilence were common. During his novitiate year, A young friar named Olivier was infected with a plague and the others resolved to abandon the house, but John remained to care for him. In one instance, John prevented Olivier from jumping out of a window during a bout of delirium; John prayed that he would regain his senses, and provided that he be able to make his final confession, after which Olivier died.

Later, John was affected by a serious fever, but recovered quickly after invoking a prayer used by sacristans in St. Peter's in Rome in order to dispel fevers. His superiors ordered John to invoke the same prayer daily over the sick and suffering of Dol, and many claimed to be healed by his prayers. Word of the miraculous cures spread and the Bishop of Dol, Antione Revol, became suspicious. He attended one of the healing sessions, and when, as usual, John invoked the prayer over the sick and blessed them, he intervened, asking how John could be so bold as to bless people in the presence of a bishop. John apologized, for he had not known that the Bishop was present. Bishop Revol asked for an opinion about the healings from his theologian, who replied, "If people had the faith of Br. John, and lived as authentically as he, the gift of healing the sick would be far more common." Afterward, Rivol became a confidant of John, visiting him often and consulting him about spiritual matters, and John wrote the work titled L'Aiguillon, les flammes, les fléches et le miroir de l'amour de Dieu, a description of his prayer life, for Bishop Revol.

== The Reform of Touraine ==
In the early 17th century, a reform movement began within the Order of Carmelites in the Touraine Province of France led by friars Pierre Behourt and Philippe Thibault. The reform advocated poverty, the interior life and regular observance as antidotes for laxity and decadence of religious life. In 1611, then prior Thibault requested that John be transferred to the priory at Rennes, the principle community of the Reform, because his reputation for holiness was spreading throughout the province. John had to undergo a second Novitiate in order to join the Reformed Province. John served as instructor and spiritual director for the novices, forming the spiritual lives of a generation of reformed Carmelite friars, thus he became known as the "Soul of the Reform." Donatien of St. Nicholas, a disciple and editor of his works, said about John, "it is certain that this illuminated blind brother has been chosen and given to us by God to be the teacher and director of the spiritual life of our Reform."

During his days at Rennes, where he lived until his death, John was an exemplar of observance. He was always in church early, at the conventual Mass and during Office he played the organ, which was his official post, he would pray the Brother's Office, that is the set number of Our Fathers stipulated by Carmelite Rule, and he observed the fasts of the church and order rigorously. The rest of the time he spent in or near his cell, unless attending to his special ministry of visiting the sick and comforting the dying. Donatien wrote that, "his face was frequently beheld to be divinely radiant, resplendent with as it were some luminous ray, as I myself and other very trustworthy brothers have witnessed." His devotion to the Blessed Sacrament was privileged, and he frequently received sensible consolation for hours after receiving communion, as the Eucharistic species subsisted in his body. He admitted to his superiors that God had given him a supernatural faculty for sensing the presence or absence of the Eucharist, as well as the presence of priests, even when they were inconspicuous among lay persons.

Often, he would compose and sing canticles, accompanying himself on an instrument, in order to recollect himself, and later, fearing that he disturbed his brethren in nearby cells, he would knock on their doors and beg for pardon.

John of St. Samson had difficulty following the method of mental prayer proposed by the Reform and practiced in common by the community. Thibault asked him to dictate his manner of prayer, and John produced the brief tract titled, the Exercise of the Elevation of Spirit to God. Thibault submitted the tract to theologians of the faculty at Sorbonne, a nearby Jesuit college, and the Capuchin friars; and all answered favorably. The Discalced Carmelite friars approved as well, adding, "do not extinguish this spirit."

== Death ==
In old age, John of St. Samson, who long depended on his hearing, grew increasingly deaf, and ulcers on his legs limited his mobility. The community appointed a younger friar, Joseph of Jesus, to be his guardian angel, caring for the needs of the elderly brother. John was criticized unfavorably by other friars, who complained that he was privileged, well fed and clothed, while contributing little to the community. He suffered an unfriendly persecution in the convent; others mocked his gestures and manner of speaking, they even criticized the way he played the organ.

He fell ill on September 3, 1636, and reportedly, while bedridden, he frequently and lovingly prayed the biblical names of God of Yahweh and Elohim. After receiving the last sacraments, he apologized saying, "I beg everyone from the highest to the lowest to forgive me; I have given them all much very bad example." John of St. Samson died on September 14, 1636, the Feast of the Exaltation of the Cross. His last words were, "I have been crucified with Christ," words of St. Paul to Galatians, which he frequently invoked in his meditations. His relics now remain in the Grands Carmes Carmelite convent in Nantes.

== Works ==
Due to his blindness, John of St. Samson did not write any works by hand. Many of the original manuscripts come from his office of instructor of novices; his lectures were copied by secretaries, revised and used for later lectures. Joseph of Jesus recounted that often John could not recall what he had dictated because he usually followed the promptings of the Spirit without reflection. The dictations can be unorganized and full of digressions, but also spontaneous with passionate colloquies. Due to his blindness, and his exalted spiritual state, his thinking is often abstract and lacking imagery. The manuscripts of John of St. Samson were compiled and edited by Donatien of St. Nicholas, a disciple and secretary, and published in two tomes in 1658. Some major works include: The True Spirit of Carmel, which asserts contemplation as primary in the Carmelite Charism, The Mirror and Flames of Divine Love, on the life of prayer and love of God, written for Bishop Antione Revol of Dol, Soliloquies and Contemplations, affectionate conversations of the soul with God, The Epithalamium, an extended prose poem of Bridal Mysticism. He composed many poems and canticles, which were recorded by his willing secretaries.

Although he lived after the golden ages of Spanish Mysticism and the French School, John of St. Samson was notably more influenced by the earlier northern mysticism of John of Ruusbroec and Johannes Tauler. In some sense, he was incubated by his lack of education, hidden life, and dependence on others to read to him. His spirituality favored introversion and continual prayer, and more affective than intellectual, he often speaks of the soul engaging in an amorous battle with God; that the soul should throw darts of longing into the heart of God, which are returned by His grace. One of his foremost teachings was of the value of frequent, internal and affectionate prayers called aspirations. John of St. Samson was influenced by teachings of Hugh of Balma and Hendrik Herp and continued the doctrine further, asserting that aspirations are the shortest path for the soul to be carried into the highest stages of the spiritual life. He wrote, "Aspiration, practiced as a familiar, respectful and loving conversation with God, is such an excellent method, that, by means of it, one soon arrives at the summit of all perfection, and falls in love with Love."

YOU AND I, MY LOVE (ASPIRATORY PRAYER OF JOHN OF SAINT SAMSON)

You and I, my love, you and I, you and I, and never another nor more! Since you are entirely good and all goodness itself; Since you are entirely glorious and all glory itself; Since you are entirely holy and all holiness itself! Amen.
