= Bernardino de Laredo =

Fray Bernardino de Laredo (1482 in Seville – 1540 in San Francisco del Monte, Sevilla) was a physician and Franciscan mystical writer.

== Life ==
Of noble birth, Bernardino grew up in Seville and became a page to an exiled Portuguese nobleman (Duke Álvaro of Portugal) in that city. He then left the nobleman's service at age thirteen to apply himself seriously to school. He studied medicine, possibly graduating from the University of Seville, and began to practice as a physician around 1507. In 1510, though, a close friend of entered the Order of St Francis as a lay brother, and he did the same. He remained a lay brother in the Franciscan order for the next thirty years, for most of that time living in the friary of San Francisco del Monte, near Villaverde del Río, a town about eighteen miles north-east of Seville. He acted as apothecary to the friary, and later to the entire province. He reputation must have spread, for he is known, on a number of occasions, to have attended King John III of Portugal and his consort, Queen Catherine, sister of the Emperor Charles V. He died, at the friary of San Francisco del Monte, in 1540. He was buried there, and in 1771, with the closure of the monastery, his remains were moved to the monastery in Cantillana. In 1955, the remains were moved to the parish church in Cantillana.

== Work ==
Laredo has left us three works. He wrote two medical works in Castilian, but with Latin titles: Metaphora medicinae (Seville 1522 and 1536) and Modus faciendi cum ordine medicandi (Seville 1527, 1534, 1542, 1627).

He is most remembered, though, for his spiritual treatise entitled Ascent of Mount Sion (Subida del Monte Sión), a foundational text of recogimiento mysticism. This was written soon after the second treatise on medicine, being finished in 1529, but was only published, in Seville, in 1535. The work is divided into three books. A second edition appeared in 1538, which largely left the first two books unchanged, but greatly altered the third book. This second redaction became the influential version, as it was reprinted at Medina del Campo in 1542, at Valencia in 1590, and at Álcala de Henares in 1617. In each of these editions, a thirty-six page opuscule by Laredo, the Josephina, was printed as an appendix.

Book One of the Ascent deals with self-knowledge, and how to purify the senses. Book Two deals with the mysteries of the life of Christ and Mary. Book Three, the only part translated into English, deals with the contemplative life. The essential concept of this third book is that of quiet contemplation, a not think of anything to achieve true union with God. Twelve letters written by Laredo are also extant, although only in the original sixteenth-century Spanish editions.

In the 1535, the only source of importance is Richard of St Victor, as Laredo had evidently read his Benjamin major and Benjamin minor. Laredo lived not far from his contemporary Francisco de Osuna, and some translations of passages, such as by Augustine, Jean Gerson and pseudo-Cyprian (Arnold of Bonneval) are almost identical; however, Laredo never makes any direct mention of Osuna.

The second edition of 1538 shows much greater influence by certain authors than Laredo had shown previously – in particular of Dionysius, Herp (or Harphius, the fifteenth-century Franciscan of Malines), and Hugh of Balma. E Allison Peers argues that Hugh of Balma, although only quoted six times in the 1538 edition, is largely responsible for Laredo's shifting of emphasis from the intellectual to the affective in mental prayer, a change which causes him to reduce the number of quotes from Richard of St Victor, whose intellectual approach now seems imperfect. The ten quotes from Dionysius, argues Peers, are almost certainly made from Balma's Sun of contemplatives.

Teresa of Ávila credits her reading of the Ascent for helping her deal with her perplexity caused by, on the one hand, her inability to meditate, and on the other hand, by supernatural experiences she was undergoing. Laredo also appears to have influenced the mystics Juan de los Angeles and Tomas de Jesus.(p53) Although it has been suggested that he influenced John of the Cross’s thought.
