= Touraine Reform =

17th century French movement

The Touraine Reform (French: Réforme de Touraine) was a Carmelite Counter-Reformation movement of return to regular observance, which appeared in France at the beginning of the 17th century, spreading throughout Catholic Europe and beyond. It gave rise, among the Carmelites of the Ancient Observance, to the constitution of an independent congregation, whose spirit of strict observance would gradually spread to all the provinces of the order. Unlike the Discalced Carmelites in Spain whose Reform led to the creation of a separate order, the Touraine Reform remained internal to the Ancient Observance.

== History ==
At the end of the 16th century, the Carmelites of the Ancient Observance had seven provinces in France. These had been seriously affected by the French Wars of Religion: such poverty reigned in the few convents that had escaped destruction that the monks were forced to provide for their own subsistence individually, often in defiance of the Rule of St. Albert and to the detriment of their religious vows. Faced with this deplorable situation, Carmelites from the province known as Touraine decided to react: their names were Pierre Behourt, Louis Charpentier and Philippe Thibault, the latter being considered the father of the reform. A dynamic personality, he was, among other things, the author of a draft of new Constitutions, which would be at the origin of a movement of strict observance which would end up winning over the other provinces of the order from the second half of the 17th century.

As early as 1594, Pope Clement VIII had called on the Carmelites to reform. In 1603, the general of the order, Henri Silvius, in turn imposed decrees of reform. Having come to France at the request of King Henri IV of France, he enlisted the help of Philippe Thibault, whom he had previously known in Rome, to carry out his enterprise. Thus, on 20 August 1604, the provincial chapter of Touraine, meeting in Nantes, published the statutes of the reform. Then began a gradual work of imposing regular observance in the communities of the province, the convents of Rennes, then of Angers acting as pilot communities, under the leadership of Philippe Thibault. In 1633, the whole province was won over to the reform. In the second half of the 17th century, all the French Carmelite provinces were partially reformed: after Touraine, the movement had reached the province of Narbonne in 1621, then those called Toulouse, France and Provence, around 1632. Only the Parisian convent of Place Maubert could never be effectively reformed.

Since 1624, the movement had spread from the convent of Valenciennes to all the houses of present-day Belgium. Michel de Saint-Augustin and his directress, Maria Petyt, were particularly distinguished in the field of Christian mysticism. In 1649, it was a Belgian Carmelite, Gabriel de l'Annonciation, who officially introduced the Touraine Reform into the two provinces of Germany, which were declared entirely reformed in 1660. From there, the convents of Vienna and Budapest, as well as certain houses in Silesia and Bohemia, were affected by the return to regular observance. Finally, the reform penetrated into Poland through the convents of Poznań (1647), Gdańsk and Bydgoszcz (1672). The Netherlands, Ireland and Brazil would also be affected.

Alongside this essentially European spread, the French Grand Carmelites established themselves in the Antilles, in Saint Kitts and in Guadeloupe, in the second half of the 17th century. In 1699, the congregation resulting from the reform had one hundred and twenty-two convents in France: there would be one hundred and thirty-three in 1789, despite a certain drop in numbers. During the 18th century, three priors general were French, including André Audras (from 1780 to 1788). During the French Revolution, Brother Jacques Retouret was one of those exiled from the Île Madame.

== Spirituality ==
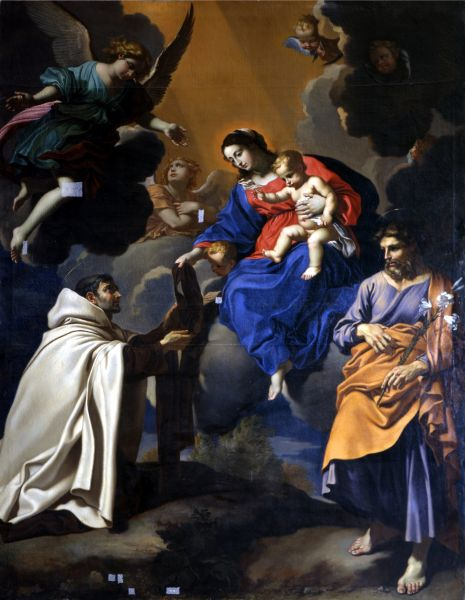
La Vierge remettant le scapulaire à saint Simon Stock by Nicolas Mignard, 17th century painting.

Unlike the previous Teresian reform, which had given birth to the new order of the Discalced Carmelites, the reform of Touraine received, at the general chapter held in Rome in 1620, the status of an independent congregation, while remaining within the Ancient Observance: Philippe Thibaut hoped, in fact, to see the movement spread to the whole order. However, like the Spanish reform, it was a return to strict observance, in a spirit of solitude, silence and prayer.

The first author of the new Constitutions, Thibault was inspired by the primitive Rule, attributed to St. Albert of Jerusalem and mitigated by Pope Eugene IV. But by insisting particularly on Chapter VII, which recommends that the monk meditate day and night on the law of the Lord, the reformer reconnected with the essentially contemplative charism of Carmel.

In this respect, his choice of Jean de Saint-Samson, a blind mystical lay brother, as master of the interior life of the reform, is revealing of his spiritual priorities. Close to John of Ruusbroec and Teresa of Ávila, Jean de Saint-Samson became the soul of the movement. This is why we find the main orientations of the Devotio Moderna and of "discalced" spirituality in the works resulting from the Touraine reform, particularly the Proper Method of Mental Prayer and the Directory of Novices, composed by Marc de la Nativité.

More precisely, the practices advocated there, namely the experience of the presence of God (found, at the same time, in the Discalced Carmelite Laurent of the Resurrection) and aspirative prayer, constitute a legacy of the doctrine of the Flemish Franciscan Hendrik Herp, who inspired a good number of mystics between the 15th and 17th centuries.

Predominant in Saint-Samson, contemplation goes hand in hand, in Thibault, with the apostolate, so that the mixed life will be imposed within the reformed of the strict observance. Among the forms of external activities developed by these, we will remember the preachings and the confessions, but also the animations of the Carmelite Third Order, of the famous brotherhood of the Brown Scapular and of the Breton sanctuary of Sainte-Anne d'Auray. According to a decree of the Holy See, the passage of a Carmelite to the reform of Touraine required an additional year of novitiate, accompanied by a new religious profession.

== Legislation ==
- 1594: Reform decrees of Pope Clement VIII
- 1603-1604: Reform decrees of General Henri Silvus
- 1610: Government standards for Angers and Rennes
- 1611: Pro Observantia Declaration
- 1612: Rules and statutes of Rennes, written by Philippe Thibault
- 1615: Exercitia Conventualia
- 1636-1637-1639: Constitutions of the Reformation

== Personalities ==
- Pierre Behourt (1564-1633)
- Philippe Thibault (1572-1638)
- John of St. Samson (1574-1636)
- Dominique de Saint-Albert (1595-1634)
- Maur de l'Enfant-Jésus (1618-1690)
- Bernard de Sainte-Madeleine (1589-1669)
- Marc de la Nativité de la Vierge (1617-1696)
- Donatien de Saint-Nicolas (1683)
- Hugues de Saint-François (1667)
- Lézin de Sainte-Scholastique (1674)
- Daniel de la Vierge-Marie (1615-1678)
- Michel de Saint-Augustin (1621-1684)
- Maria Petyt (1623-1677)

== See also ==
- French school of spirituality
