= Dysmas (name) =

Dysmas or Dismas is a male given name of Greek origin, derived from the Greek word "Δυσμάς" dysmas, meaning "to the west". Related names include Dimas and Dyzma (Polish). The name may refer to:

- Dismas Becker (1936–2010), American politician
- Dismas Hataš (1724–1777), Bohemian composer
- Dismas Nsengiyaremye (born 1945), Rwandan politician and Prime Minister
- Dysmas de Lassus (born 1956), French Catholic monk

== See also ==
- Penitent thief
