= Michiel de Swaen =

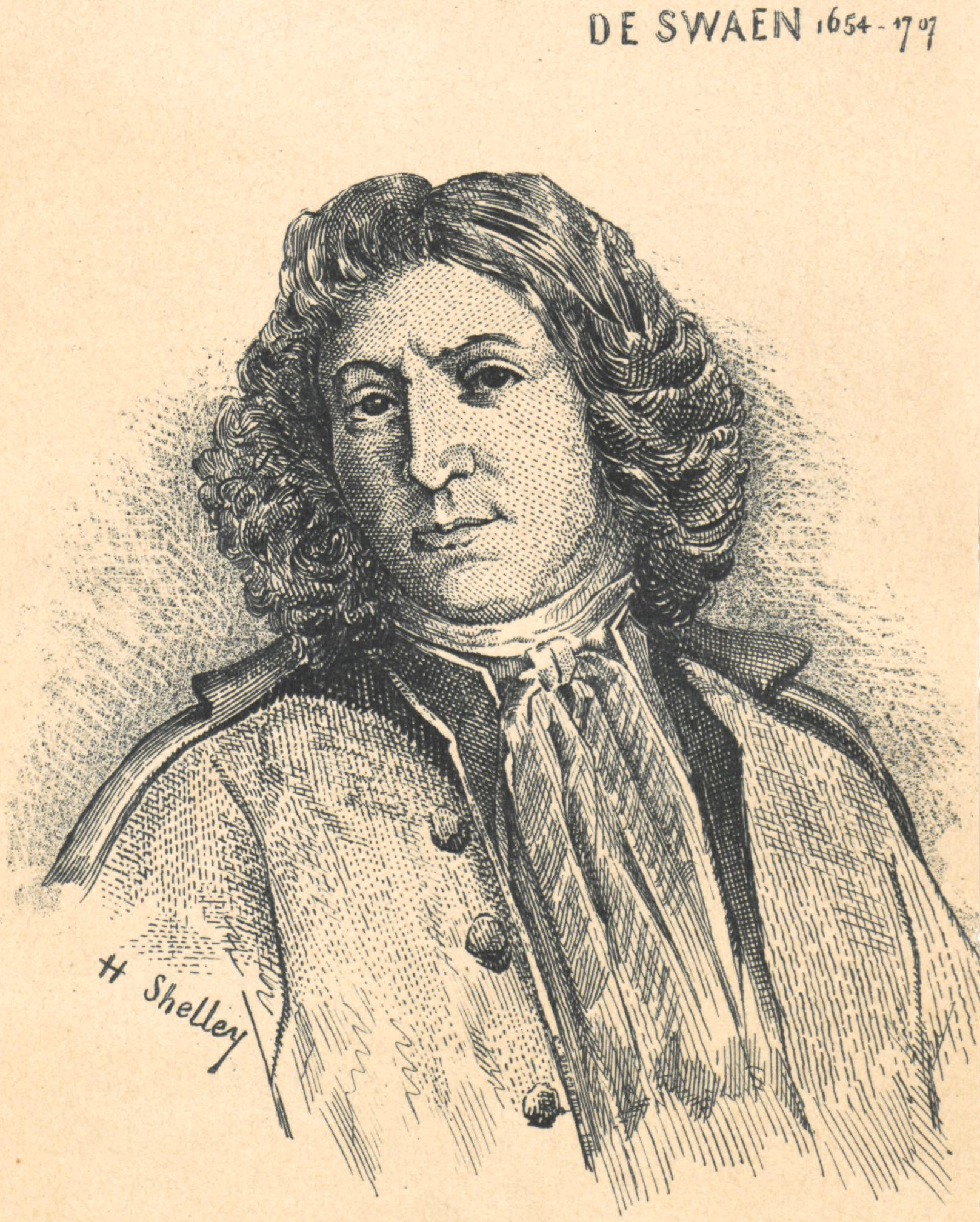
- Michiel de Swaen
- Born: 20 January 1654; Dunkirk, Spanish Netherlands
- Died: 3 May 1707 (aged 53); Dunkirk, Kingdom of France
- Occupations: Poet, rederijker, surgeon
- Writing career
- Period: 17th century
- Genres: Drama, poetry

Michiel de Swaen (Dutch: [miˈxil də ˈsʋaːn]; 20 January 1654 – 3 May 1707) was a surgeon and a rhetorician from the Spanish Netherlands.

== Childhood, schooling and professional life ==
On January 20, 1654, Michiel de Swaen entered the world in Dunkirk as the eldest child of Pieter de Swaen, hailing from Cambrai in Hainaut, and his wife, Catharina Senlegier, a native of Hulst in Zeeland.

He studied at the college of the Jesuits in his native town, where he probably got a humanist education, acquired chiefly through theatre, as in those days theatre was the foundation of a pedagogical education. After six years of schooling - three of which with a surgeon and three at an unknown place - De Swaen settled in Dunkirk (Duinkerke) as a surgeon and barber, at the same time being committed to the literary life in this city. Although in those days there were already 14 surgeons active in Dunkirk, De Swaen must have found enough patients as he complained in an occasional poem about the limited time he could spend on poetry.

== Historical and literary background ==
=== The occupation of Dunkirk ===
The 17th century was a decisive period in the history of the Low Countries and the events of that time also considerably affected De Swaen's own life. While the Republic of the Seven United Netherlands witnessed its Golden Age, the Southern Netherlands suffered economic decline and the miseries of war. The once prospering port town of Antwerp started to decline as a metropolis and this to the benefit of towns and cities in the Dutch Republic, like Amsterdam, The Hague, Rotterdam and Utrecht.

In 1662, De Swaen being eight years old, England sold the Flemish town of Dunkirk to King Louis XIV of France. A year later, French became the mandatory formal language, which forced public life in this part of Flanders to take place entirely in French; since the Ordinance of Villers-Cotterêts it was illegal in France to speak any other languages than French. The French influence was nonetheless not felt at once; a significant part of the population continued to speak Dutch till the end of the 19th century. Moreover, all works De Swaen wrote were written in Dutch. It is only after 1700 that performances in the playhouses in Dunkirk were held exclusively French.

What De Swaen might have thought about the French occupation can indirectly be understood by reading the sonnet in which he looks back with unconcealed nostalgia on a journey in the Republic of the Seven United Netherlands; he visited Rotterdam, where he lodged at his son's place. De Swaen seems to have preferred the Dutch standards and values above those that his occupied country had to offer under French rule; there is no doubt about that after reading the sonnet aen den Heer Van Heel:

Original Dutch sonnet	Approximate English translation of the sonnet:
Wat claegt gy, heer van Heel, wat doet gy Hollant treuren, Omdat een wilde Swaen syn kust verlaten heeft? De Swaen, met een meerder recht, tot rouwe sigh begeeft, Nu een soo soet verblyf niet meer hem magh gebeuren. O Hollant ! vreedsaem lant, waerin de vryheyt leeft, Wat socht ik die vergeefs by uwe nagebueren, Waer Frans en Castiliaen de rust en vrede schueren, Waar't hooft der borgery voor vreemde heeren beeft... O had ik, lieve Lant, in uw begryp gebleven, Hoe vroylyk wiert myn stem tot singen voorts gedreven, Of aen de Rotte-stroom, of midden op de Maes! Nu leef ik in een oort waer vreughde is uytgeweken; Myn spys is bittre gal, myn sang... Eylaes! Eylaes! Och! Och! waer heb ik my, misleyde Swaen, versteken!’	Why do you complain, Lord of the Universe, why do you make Holland mourn, Because a wild Swaen has left his coast? The Swaen with more rights, can start to mourn, As he can stay no longer in as sweet a place. O Netherlands! Peaceable country, in which lives freedom, In vain I sought for in neighbouring countries, where French and Spanish rip tranquillity and peace, where the most distinguished of citizens tremble for foreign lords, O, if only, dear country, I could have stayed within your embrace, How joyful my voice would have been stimulated to sing, either at Rotterdam’s river, or in the middle of the Meuse River! Now I live in a place where all joy has vanished; My nourishment is as bitter as gall, while my singing... Alas! Alas! Oh dear! Oh dear! Where have I, mislead Swaen, imprisoned myself!”

From: De zedighe doot van Carel den Vijfen; aen den heer Van Heel, my onbekent, over syne clacht, op myn vertrek, uyt Hollant, Michiel de Swaen

Michiel de Swaen wrote in the Dutch standard language of the time. The admiration for the lost native country was a constant in the Dutch literature in that part of Flanders that had been occupied by the French. For many French Flemish citizens, De Swaen is a symbol of their rich cultural past.

=== Literature in the Netherlands ===
Dutch literature experienced its Golden Age in the Republic of the Seven United Netherlands in the 17th century. Some of the most high ranking works in 17th century Dutch literature were published in 1654, the year in which De Swaen was born, and in 1655: Trintje Cornelis by Constantijn Huygens, Lucifer by Joost van den Vondel and Alle de wercken (complete works) by Jacob Cats.

=== Chambers of Rhetoric ===
The movement of the rhetoricians came into existence as a kind of cultural social club in the 15th century: most rhetoricians in the Southern Netherlands in the 17th century originated from Flanders and Brabant. The rhetoricians were influenced by humanism and by the Counter-Reformation. Organised within a chamber of rhetoric, they devoted themselves to literature. In a way, they can be compared to the German "Meistersinger". After the French had banished the Dutch language from public life in the occupied parts of Flanders, the chambers of rhetoric were left as the last and sole institution of Dutch culture.

== De Swaen as a rhetorician ==
By profession, De Swaen was a surgeon; he also formed part of the judicature. But he was also a member of the Dunkirk chamber of rhetoric, the Carsouwe, also known as Sint Michiel (Saint Michael was their patron saint); the chamber of the Kassouwieren (different ways of spelling for instance De Kersauwe are found; the word descends from the Dutch kersouw or daisy). Michiel de Swaen, as a rhetorician, was befriended by rhetoricians from the region coming from cities such as Diksmuide and Ypres. He became a prince in 1687 at the Dunkirk chamber. Through the chambers of rhetoric, rhetoricians such as De Swaen kept in touch with the part over de schreve of the Southern Netherlands under Habsburg rule, even after the French occupation. For instance, in 1688 De Swaen was a guest in Veurne of the chamber the Kruys-Broeders. In 1700, De Swaen participated in a dramatics competition, called the landjuweel, organised by the Bruges chamber of rhetoric, the Drie Santinnen. To the amazement of many, he did not win the competition. His fellow men convinced him to write to the Bruges chamber of rhetoric to prove to them that they had made a mistake. Disappointed for only having obtained the second prize and facing the existing standards of the Bruges competition, he attempted to formulate a poetical theory Neder-duitsche digtkonde of rym-konst, which he made after the prototype of that by Aristotle.

By the end of his life, De Swaen pretended that he only stayed with the chamber of rhetoric as a member to keep in touch with his friends. Nonetheless, he took his work as a rhetorician seriously, taking Vondel and others as an example.

== Works ==
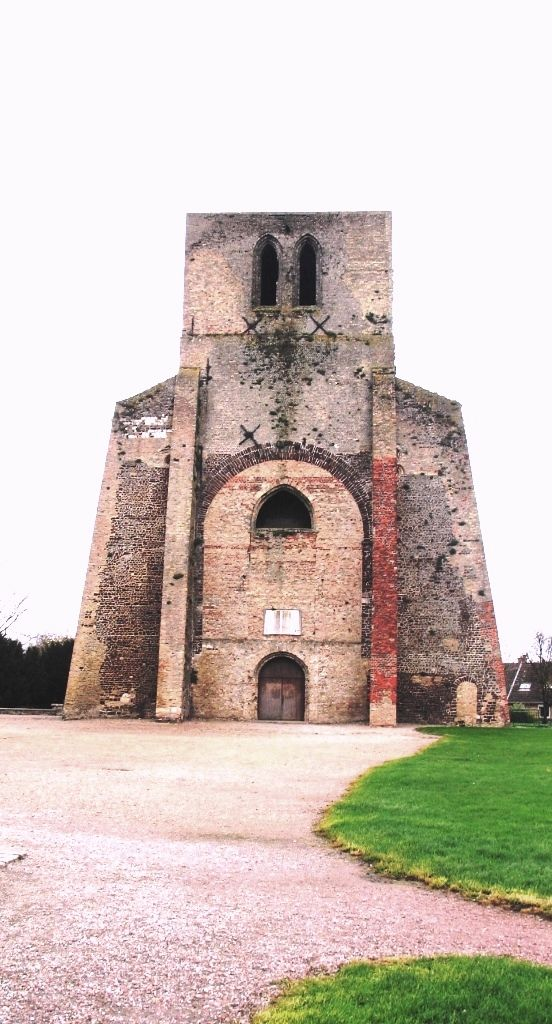
Ruins of the abbey of Sint-Winoksbergen, destroyed by the French revolutionaries

De Swaen withdrew to a certain extent from his occupation with the chamber of rhetoric on the grounds of his Christian belief, although he had often been stimulated by his friends - the rhetoricians. And even though he had eagerly applied himself to the chamber of rhetoric in his childhood, he turned down all proposals to publish his work. Only the publication of Andronicus, a translation of a work by Jean Galbert de Campistron, had been granted by De Swaen in 1707. His translation of Le Cid by Corneille was published in Dunkirk by printer Pieter Labus without his approval in 1694. Most of his works were only published after his life, in Bruges or in Ghent, cities in the Southern Netherlands ruled by the Habsburgs. Many of his writings were preserved in the abbey of Sint-Winoksbergen, until the abbey was destroyed under the French Revolution. Therefore, it is uncertain today whether we know all of De Swaen's output.

De Swaen's poems were often inspired by religion and have presumably been influenced by humanist authors such as Jacob Cats and Joost van den Vondel. His Catharina was obviously influenced by Vondel's Maegdhen. After all, the Belgian Flemish poet Guido Gezelle later called De Swaen the Vondel of Duinkerke. De Swaen's theoretical study Neder-duitsche digtkonde of rym-konst proves his erudition, especially his knowledge of works by 17th century French poet-playwright Pierre Corneille and Aristotle's Poetics.

De Swaen's religious convictions and his dedication to the Counter-Reformation are illustrated in works such as Het leven en de dood van Jesus Christus (The Life and Death of Jesus Christ). In this, preceded by Anton van Duinkerke, De Swaen followed the example of the moralising ‘'Diktatiek'’ by Poirtiers, which inspired Cats too. In addition, he wrote two tragedies Martelaarspelen or Treurspelen (tragedies about the martyrs Catharina and Mauritius).

De Swaen also showed an interest in European history and wrote an historical play De zedighe doot van Carel den Vijfden (about the death of Charles V). His texts dedicated to Charles V, Holy Roman Emperor, prove his attachment to the Netherlands and his religious conviction; he depicts Charles V as a true Christian hero. De Swaen's most important work, De gecroondse leerse, which he himself described as a clucht-spel (comedy), is based upon an anecdote about Charles V and was tremendously popular.

De Swaen also wrote some occasional poems.

Although De Swaen wrote in the Dutch standard language of his time, he was no stranger to classic and French authors. He handed over his Dutch translation of Pierre Corneille's Le Cid to Barentin, an administrator of the French king Louis XIV. He also translated Jean Galbert de Campistron's Andronicus into Dutch. Many of his works show the influence of French classicism, such as De gecroonde leerse, split up into five parts and formulated in alexandrines.

== Most significant works ==
De Swaen's most significant works are: De gecroonde leerse (1688), Catharina (1702), Mauritius, Andronicus (1700), Le Cid (1694), De Menschwording (the embodiment, 1688), Het leven en de dood van Jesus Christus (1694), Neder-duitsche digtkonde of rym-konst (the Dutch poetry and art of rhyming, ca. 1702), de zedighe doot van Carel den Vijfden (ca. 1707).

=== Catharina ===
Catharina is a Christian tragedy about Saint Catherine of Alexandria in which the most important subject is the conflict between paganism and Christianity: the martyr Catherine of Alexandria was executed by order of the Roman emperor Maxentius. This work has a special place in Dutch literature as the genre it seems to belong to was almost non-existent in the Republic of the Seven United Netherlands.

=== De gecroonde leerse ===
One day Jacquelijn, the wife of Teunis the shoemaker, goes to the market where she buys a capon for a family feast to take place that evening. Emperor Charles V is watching everything from a distance. Keen on the appetising capon, he commands his servant to follow Jacquelijn. She shows him where she lives. Charles decides to go there on his own. To get an invitation, the emperor offers wine to everyone. A day later, Teunis the shoemaker is summoned by the emperor. The rather worried poor Teunis goes to the Court where he recognises the generous guest of last evening. Charles V then appoints Teunis as his imperial shoemaker.

De gecroonde leerse is De Swaen's only comedy and one of the most important works in Dutch literature. The work is played as well in the Southern as the Northern Netherlands and even in South Africa. Although the author describes the work as a clucht-spel (comedy), it displays nevertheless also features of French classic comedy.

=== De zedighe doot van Carel den Vijfden ===
De zedighe doot van Carel den Vijfden is available through the Digital Library for Dutch Literature.

== Chronology of the Works ==
- 1688: De gecroonde leerse
- 1688: De Menschwording
- 1694: Le Cid, translated from Pierre Corneille's work with the same name
- 1694: Het leven en de dood van Jesus Christus
- 1700: Andronicus, for the greater part based on the play of the same name by Jean Galbert de Campistron
- 1702: Catharina
- 1702: Mauritius
- about 1702: Neder-duitsche digtkonde of rym-konst
- about 1704: De zedighe doot van Carel den Vijfden

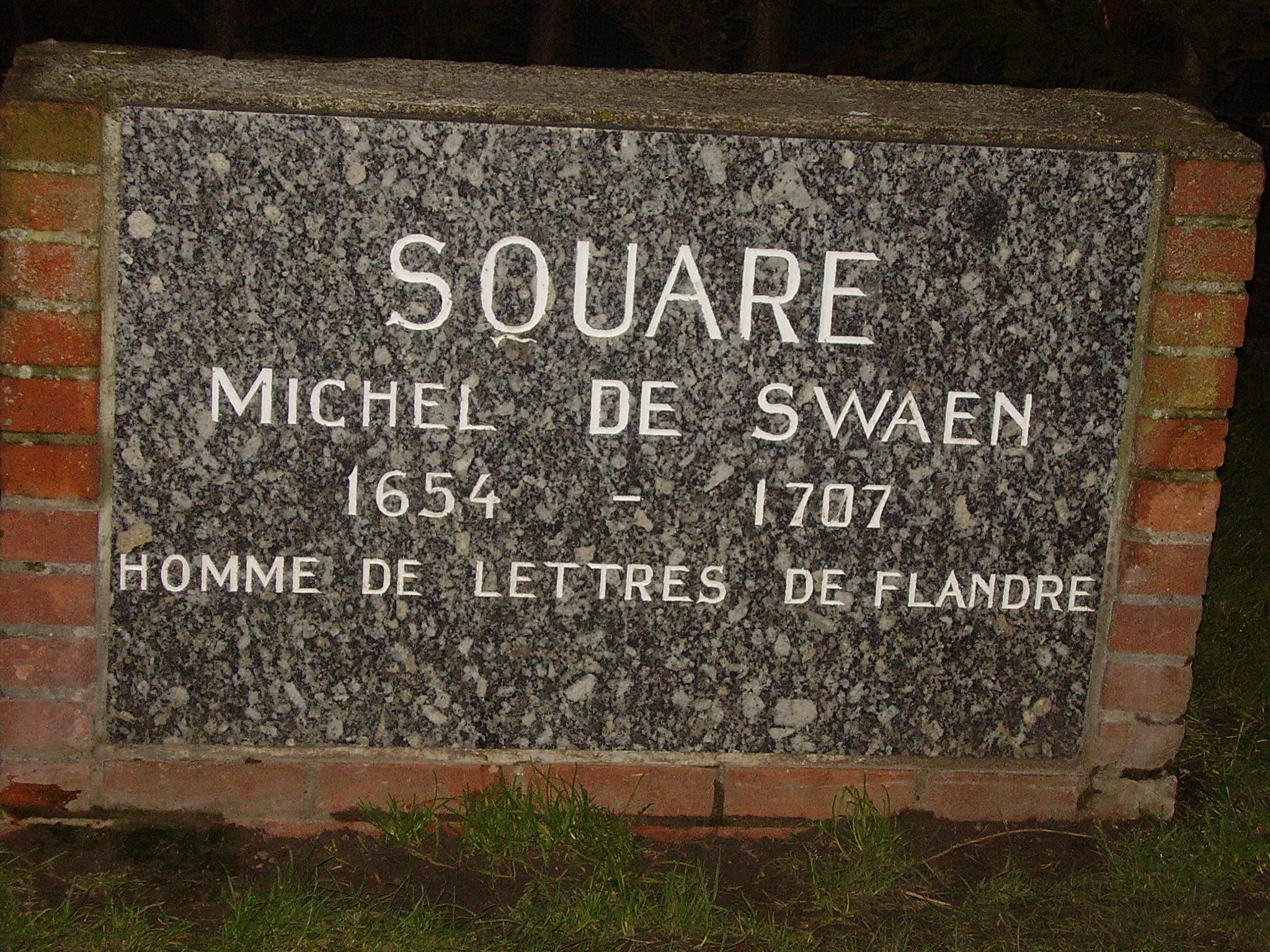
A square is dedicated to de Swaen in Coudekerque-Branche

== Influence ==
De Swaen was unquestionably one of the most famous rhetoricians in the Low Countries during the 17th century. Today, together with Maria Petyt and Edmond de Coussemaker, he is one of the most prominent representatives of Dutch culture in France; Guido Gezelle called him the Vondel of Duinkerke.

== Varia ==
The French Flemish "Michiel de Swaenkring" (Michiel de Swaen circle) has been named after him. In Duinkerke (Dunkirk) a street and a secondary school "Le Collège Michel de Swaen" have been named after him and in Nieuw-Koudekerke, there is a Michiel de Swaen Square.

== Sources ==
- M. Sabbe, Het leven en de werken van Michel de Swaen (1904)
- De Swaen in de Digitale Bibliotheek voor de Nederlandse Letteren
- W.J.C. Buitendijk, Het Calvinisme in de spiegel van de Zuidnederlandse literatuur der contrareformatie (1942)[
- A. Dacier et P. Corneille, Een bronnenonderzoek, in Versl. en Meded. Kon. Vl. Acad. (1954)
- C. Huysmans, Het geheim van een mysteriespel, in Versl. en Meded. Kon. Vl. Acad. (1926)
- G. Landry et Georges de Verrewaere, Histoire secrète de la Flandre et de l'Artois (1982)
- Robert Noote, La vie et l'œuvre de Michel de Swaen (1994)
- E. Rombauts, in Geschiedenis van de letterk. der Nederlanden, dl. v (1952)
- R. Seys, Michiel de Swaen. Gelijk de zonnebloem, Uitgeverij Heideland, Hasselt (1964)
- R. Seys, in Twintig eeuwen Vlaanderen, 13 (1976)
- J. Vanderheyden, Michel de Swaens Digtkonde
