= Daniel de la Vierge-Marie =

Flemish Carmelite friar

Daniel de la Vierge-Marie (1615–1678), whose name was Latinized as Daniel a Virgine Maria, was a Flemish Carmelite, author of spiritual pamphlets in Flemish and Latin, but above all a historian and hagiographer of his order, within the Touraine Reform.

== Biography ==
Daniel van Audenaerde was born in Hamme (in today's Belgium) in 1615. He professed his vows with the Carmelites of the Ancient Observance of Ghent in 1632, at the time when the Touraine Reform, associated with the Counter-Reformation, was spreading to Flanders. A prominent figure in this movement to return to strict observance and the contemplative ideal, he was appointed master of novices in 1642, prior of the Brussels community in 1649, then of the convent of Mechelen, before becoming provincial in 1652 and 1663. He died in Antwerp on 24 October 1678.

== Legacy ==
Daniel's two main works are part of the movement to return to spiritual roots, initiated by the Touraine Reform. They are a history of the order entitled Vinea Carmeli, published in Antwerp in 1662, and a compilation of ancient Carmelite documents and spiritual texts, published in two folios in the same city in 1680 under the title Speculum Carmelitanum. According to Siegfried Wagner, this latter work was a pioneer in making popular the concept of the Essenes as proto-Christian and indeed portrayed the Essenes as being entirely synonymous with the ancient Carmelites from the time of the Prophet Elias. This claim was part of the Carmelite-Bollandist dispute about the antiquity of the Carmelites and excited intellectual speculation in Europe ever since about the supposedly proto-Christianity of the Essenes, down to the modern day with the discovery and study of the Dead Sea Scrolls.

The bulk of his work, however, concerns the hagiography of Carmel, to which he devoted no fewer than twenty works. In this field, unlike the Bollandists, with whom the Carmelites had entered into conflict, Daniel did not favor critical research, even if a certain concern for the truth earned him the friendship and esteem of Daniel van Papenbroeck. Particularly noteworthy is his interest in Saint Peter Thomas, the archetypal figure of Carmelite Marian devotion, honored at the time by Michael of Saint Augustine and Thomas of the Virgin.

A hagiographer of his religious family, Daniel took advantage of his books to discuss moral and spiritual virtues, or even the scapular. The emphasis placed on the interior life by the Touraine Reform permeates the rest of his writings: a series of ascetic pamphlets that enjoyed a certain success in their time. Among these, the Gulde Biecht-konste, an adaptation of the Mirror of the Penitent by the Franciscan Christophe Leutbrewer, went through eight editions starting in 1647.

As for the Konste der konsten, published in Antwerp in 1646, it is presented as a treatise on prayer in the school of the Spanish reformer, Teresa of Avila. The author considers prayer in general, then interior prayer and its trials, and finally so-called infused contemplation, considered the classical development of the spiritual life. To this end, he uses the authorities of Mary Magdalene de Pazzi, Francis de Sales and Alphonse Rodriguez, three masters also found in the work of his confrere Marius de Saint-François. He also draws inspiration from Louis de Blois, a further sign of the persistence among the Belgian Carmelites of the 17th century, of a tradition inherited from Rhenish-Flemish Mysticism.

== Works ==
- Konst der konsten, Antwerp 1646.
- Gulde Biecht-konste, Brussels, 1647. French translation: Excellent and easy method for preparing for confession, Brussels, 1683.
- Ars bene moriendi, Brussels, 1649.
- Scala virtutum quibus tanquam gradibus ad supremum perfectionis fastigium conscendit, Antwerp, 1659.
- Dissertatio apologetica pro revelatione et sponsione SS. Virginis Deiparae Mariae facta S. Petro Thomasio, Antwerp, 1659.
- Epitome vitae S. Petri Thomasii, Antwerp, 1659.
- Vinea Carmeli seu historia Ordinis, Antwerp, 1662. Translated and abridged into Flemish: Wijngaert van Carmelus oft kort begrijp..., Brussels, 1666.
- Vaticinia exarata in vita S. Angeli, Brussels, 1665.
- Vita S. Petri Thomae, Antwerp, 1666.
- Onderwijs tot een Godvruchtig Leven ende Zalighe Euwigheyt, Antwerp, 1668.
- Gheesthycken A. B. C. bestaende in meditatien over het leven en de laatste passie van Jesu Christi, Antwerp, 1669.
- Phoenix speculorum... S. Elias, Frankfurt, 1670.
- Origo, privilegia, vera et solida devotio sacri scapularis, Antwerp, 1673.
- Speculum Carmelitanum, Antwerp, 1680.

== See also ==
- Touraine Reformation
- Michel de Saint-Augustin
- Marius de Saint-François
- Thomas of the Virgin
- Isidore de Saint-Gilles
- Pierre Thomas
- Gillette de Saint-François
