= Expulsion of congregations (1902–1903) =

Expulsion of religious congregations from France under the 1901 Associations Law

Expulsion of Religious Congregations (1902–1903)
- Part of Anticlerical policies of the Third Republic
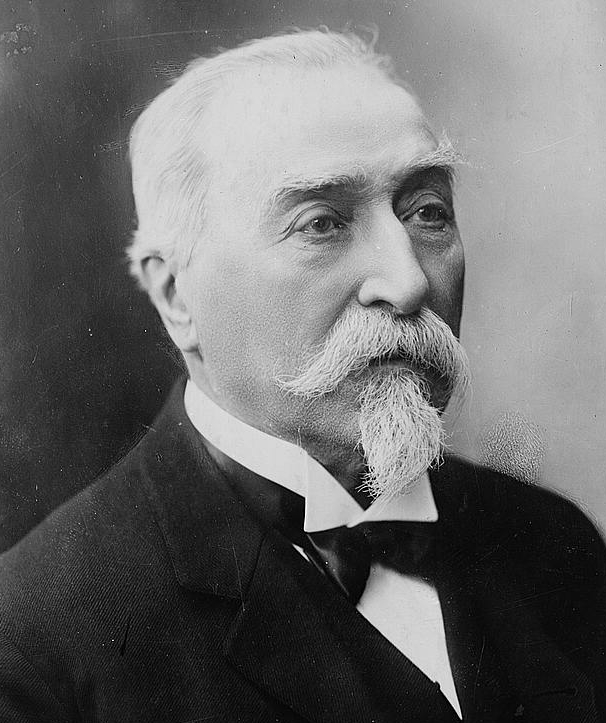
- Émile Combes, President of the Council
- Date: 1902–1903
- Location: France
- Outcome: Closure of 2,500 private educational institutions

The expulsion of religious congregations from France in the early 20th century was the second major wave of such expulsions, (Note: Following the expulsion triggered by the decree of 29 March 1880, which banned public education by religious congregations, and the Goblet Law of 30 October 1886.) resulting from the Law of 1 July 1901 on associations. This law subjected religious congregations to an exceptional regulatory framework outlined in its Title III. These expulsions were primarily driven by Émile Combes, President of the Council of Ministers.

== Contested religious congregations ==
At the end of the 19th century, under the Third Republic, the term "congregations" referred to religious congregations—associations of monks and nuns who had taken religious vows and pursued specific missions. One of their most controversial roles, particularly among anticlerical republicans, was providing education in private religious schools staffed by religious personnel.

The decrees of 1880, enacted and enforced by republicans such as Jules Ferry, aimed to expel religious congregations but failed to fully resolve the issue. As historian Jean Sévillia notes:

No measures were taken against nuns, and male congregations quickly reconstituted themselves. Many exiled communities discreetly returned in the following years, often with the tacit approval of governments under the "new spirit" policy.

Sévillia provides statistical estimates:

France at the time had exactly 1,665 congregations, comprising 154 male orders and 1,511 female congregations. An administrative survey commissioned by Waldeck-Rousseau in 1899 counted 30,000 monks and 28,000 nuns.

== Title III of the 1901 Law ==
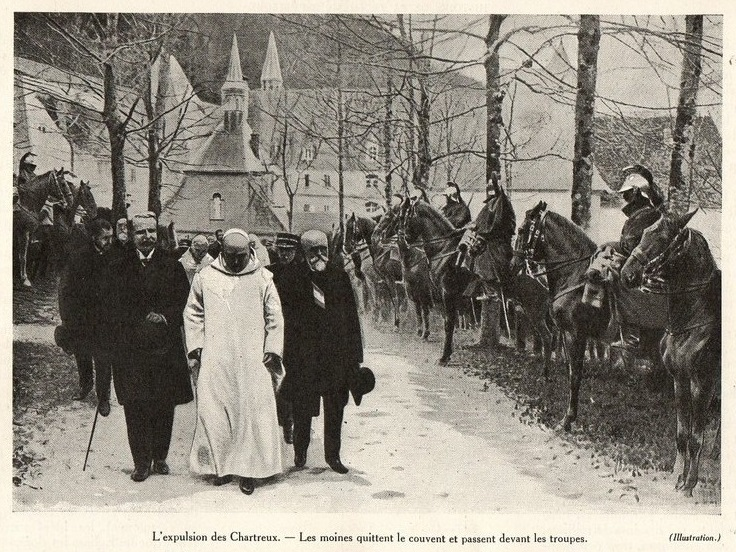
Forcible closure of the Grande Chartreuse monastery in 1903.

The Waldeck-Rousseau Law on associations required religious congregations to obtain authorization to operate legally:

No religious congregation may be formed without authorization granted by a law specifying its operating conditions. It may not establish any new institution except by a decree issued by the Council of State. The dissolution of a congregation or the closure of any of its establishments may be ordered by a decree from the Council of Ministers.

(Article 13)

Members of an unauthorized congregation are prohibited from teaching or managing an educational institution.

(Article 14)

The list of members, accounts, and inventory of the congregation must be available to the prefect.

(Article 15)

Any congregation formed without authorization will be deemed illegal.

(Article 16)

Existing congregations that have not been previously authorized or recognized must, within three months, provide evidence of compliance with these requirements. Failure to do so will result in their automatic dissolution; the same applies to congregations denied authorization.

(Article 18)

This law followed the partial reconstitution of many congregations after their expulsion in 1880.

== Policy of prohibiting congregations ==
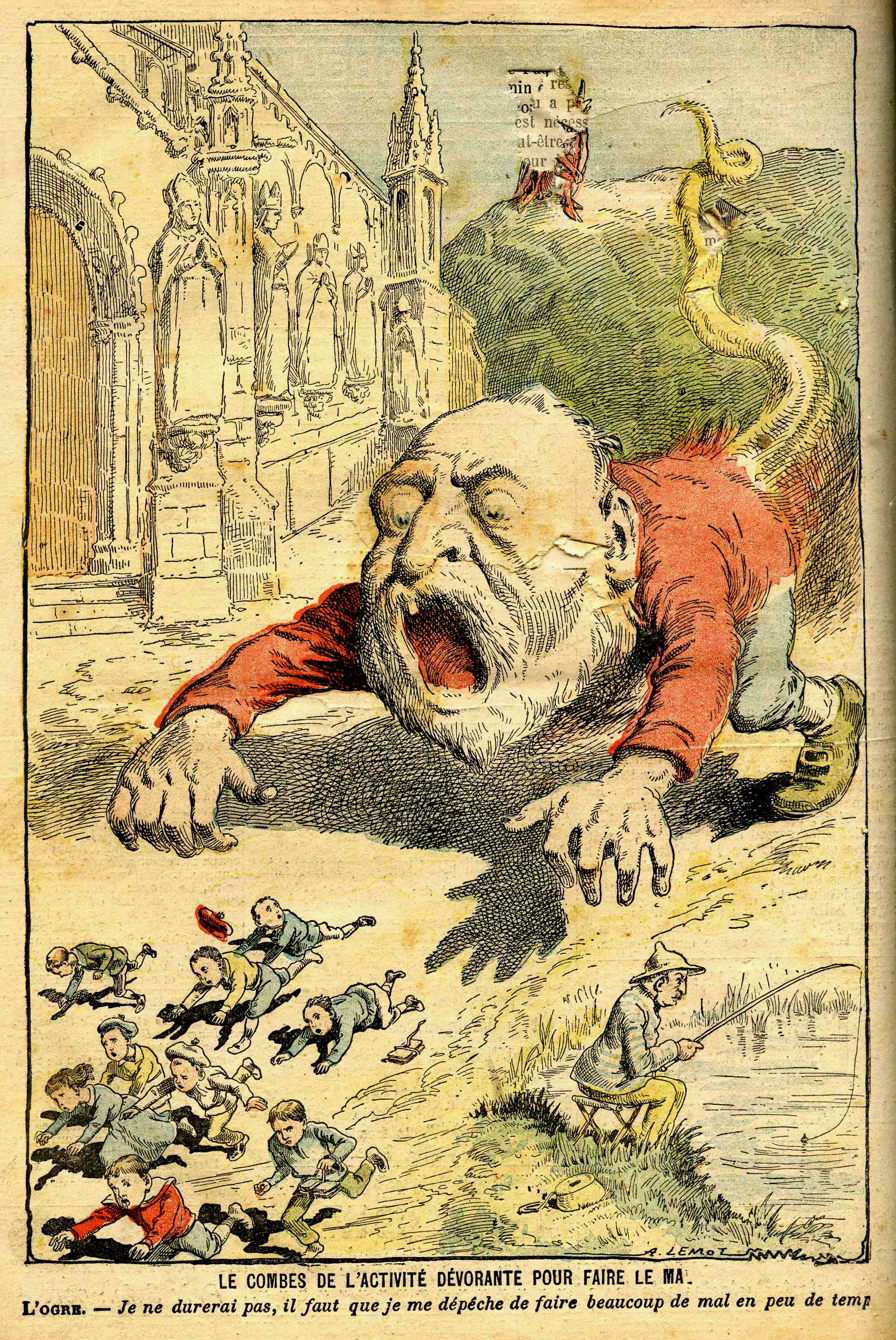
Émile Combes depicted as an ogre, Le Pèlerin, 27 July 1902.

The Vatican condemned the law but allowed congregations to seek authorization, which most did. However, the victory of the Bloc des gauches in the May 1902 legislative elections brought Émile Combes to power, allied with socialists such as Jaurès. His government pursued a staunchly anticlerical agenda, interpreting the 1901 law restrictively. In spring 1903, Combes submitted 54 authorization requests from male congregations, representing 1,915 houses, to the Chamber of Deputies, all accompanied by negative recommendations. These were divided into three groups:

- 25 teaching congregations (1,689 houses, 11,841 monks);
- 28 preaching congregations (225 houses, 3,040 monks);
- One commercial congregation (the Carthusians, 48 monks).

Simultaneously, Combes submitted requests from six male congregations—hospital, missionary, and contemplative—to the Senate, five with favorable recommendations, which were tolerated: the Brothers Hospitallers of Saint John of God, the Trappists, the Cistercians of Lérins, the White Fathers, and the Missions Africaines de Lyon. One, the Salesians of Don Bosco, received a negative recommendation. For female congregations, 390 applied for authorization, but only 81 teaching congregations’ dossiers were submitted to the Chamber, all with negative recommendations. The Chamber and Senate followed Combes’ recommendations. Unauthorized congregations faced expulsion starting in April 1903. Notably, the monks of the Grande Chartreuse were forcibly expelled on 29 April 1903. In the summer of 1902, 3,000 schools opened by unauthorized congregations before the 1901 law were closed nationwide on Combes’ orders. This process accelerated in 1903 under the Law of 4 December 1902, which imposed fines or imprisonment on:

- Anyone opening an unauthorized congregational school;
- Anyone continuing activities in a closed establishment or facilitating its operation.

The expulsions faced significant and often violent opposition from the public, particularly in Brittany, Nantes, and the Chartreuse region.

== See also ==
- Anticlericalism
- French Third Republic
- Émile Combes
- Expulsion of religious congregations (1880)
- Jules Ferry laws
- Bloc des gauches
- Grande Chartreuse
