= Recogimiento =

Recogimiento, or recollection prayer, was a school of Christian mystical prayer popular in the Spanish Golden Age. The practice involved private, mental prayer, working to consciously cultivate a habitual attention to God.

The practice of recogimiento first sprang up around the turn of the 16th century, was popularized in the 1520s, and flourished through the middle of the seventeenth century. It likely first originated in Franciscan monasteries, possibly La Salceda or San Pedro de Arlanza. The practice spread rapidly through Europe and the Americas, influencing figures including Ignatius of Loyola, Teresa of Ávila, and John of the Cross.

Foundational texts of the movement included Bernardino de Laredo's Subida del Monte Sión and Francisco de Osuna's Third Alphabet.
