= Guigo I =

Guigo I (Guigues du Chastel)
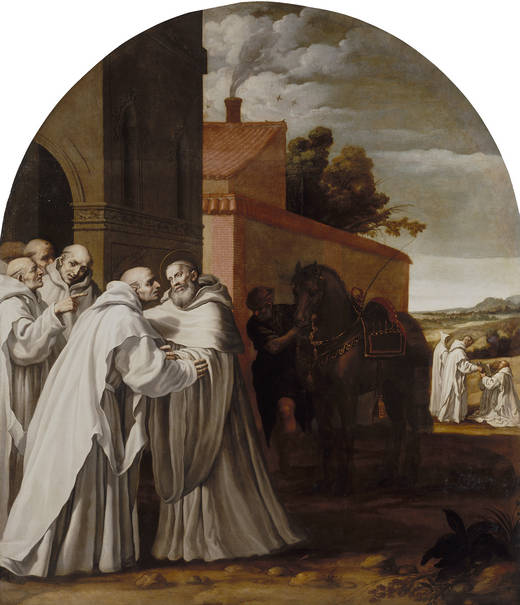
- Vincenzo Carducci, Saint Bernard of Clairvaux and Guigo I. Monastery of El Paular (Spain)

Carthusian monk
- Born: 1083 near the Chateau of Saint-Romain, Dauphiné, France
- Died: 1136
- Venerated in: Catholic Church
- Feast: 27 July (disputed by Bollandists)

Guigo I also known as Guigues du Chastel, Guigo de Castro and Guigo of Saint-Romain, was a Carthusian monk and the 5th prior of Grande Chartreuse monastery in the 12th century. He was born in 1083 near the Chateau of Saint-Romain, and entered the Grande Chartreuse in 1106.

Still a young man, his abilities led him to be elected prior in 1109 (aged 26). It was during his priorate that the original community slowly began to expand. Guigo was called on to compose the first Customs (Consuetudines) of the new hermits sometime between 1121 and 1128. Between 1109 and 1120 he also wrote the Meditations, 476 proverb-like sayings that characterized the wisdom of solitary, monastic life. In addition, some letters and a hagiographical piece survive. He was also a spiritual leader; Bernard of Clairvaux visited the Grande Chartreuse, probably in the 1120s, and wrote several letters to Guigo.

He ruled the community until his death in 1136.

He was a man of considerable learning, was known for his eloquence and great memory. He was a close friend of St. Bernard of Clairvaux and of Peter the Venerable, both of whom wrote of Guigo's sanctity.

The treatise De vita contemplativa, also known as De Contemplatione has sometimes been attributed to Guigo I. However, it cannot have been written by Guigo I, because it refers to several writings of thirteenth-century scholastic theology, including Hugh of Balma's Viae Syon Lugent. It is acknowledged to be a late thirteenth-century text, with its author generally known as Guigo de Ponte.

== See also ==
- Guigo II
- Christian meditation

== Bibliography ==
- Carthusian spirituality: the writings of Hugh of Balma and Guigo de Ponte, by Hugh of Balma, Guigo de Ponte and Dennis D. Martin (Translator), 1996, ISBN 978-0-8091-3664-3.
- The Meditations of Guigo I, Prior of the Charterhouse (Cistercian Studies Series; No. 155) 1994 ISBN 978-0-87907-655-9
- Bernard McGinn, The Growth of Mysticism, (1994).
- Bernard McGinn, The Essential Writings of Christian Mysticism, (2006).
- Bernard of Clairvaux (1957–1977). Leclerq, Jean; Talbot, Charles H.; Rochais, Henri Marie (eds.). Sancti Bernardi Opera (in Latin). Vol. 8 volumes in 9. Rome: Éditions cisterciennes. OCLC 654190630.
