= Touraine =

Historical province in west-central France

Coordinates: 47°24′N 0°41′E

- Historical province
- Flag Coat of arms

- Country: France
- Seat: Tours
- Time zone: CET

Touraine (US: /tuˈreɪn, tuˈrɛn/; French: [tuʁɛn]) is one of the traditional provinces of France. Its capital was Tours. During the political reorganisation of French territory in 1790 amid the French Revolution, Touraine formed the bulk of the Indre-et-Loire department as well as parts of the new departments of Loir-et-Cher, Indre and Vienne.

== Geography ==
Map of Touraine with modern departments and communes indicated

Traversed by the river Loire and its tributaries the Cher, the Indre and the Vienne, Touraine makes up a part of the western Paris Basin. It is well known for its viticulture. The TGV high-speed train system, which connects Tours with Paris (200 kilometers away) in just over an hour, has made Touraine a place of residence for people who work in the French capital but seek a different quality of life.

== History ==
Touraine takes its name from a Celtic tribe called the Turones, who inhabited the region about two thousand years ago. In 1044, the control of Touraine was given to the Angevins, who (as the House of Plantagenet) became kings of England in 1154, the castle of Chinon being their greatest stronghold. In 1205, Philip II Augustus of France regained Touraine. At this time, Touraine was made into a royal duchy. In 1429, Saint Joan of Arc had a historic meeting with the future King of France Charles VII at Chinon. Throughout the late 15th and 16th centuries, Touraine was a favorite residence of French kings, and the dark and gloomy castles were converted to Renaissance châteaux; for this reason the region was titled "The Garden of France". These same châteaux became popular tourist attractions in modern times. The royal duchy became a province in 1584, and was divided into departments in 1790.

== Notable people ==
- Peter des Roches (died 1238), Bishop of Winchester.
- François Rabelais (ca.1483-1553), a Renaissance writer and humanist, physician, monk and Greek scholar.
- René Descartes (1596–1650), a French philosopher, scientist and mathematician.
- Jean Thurel (1698–1807), a fusilier of the French Army and centenarian
- Alfred de Vigny (1797–1863), a French poet and early French Romanticist.
- Honoré de Balzac (1799–1850), a French novelist and playwright.
- René Boylesve (1867–1926), a French writer and literary critic.

== See also ==
- Centre-Val de Loire
- Touraine AOC
- Touraine Reform
