= Guigo II =

Writer and Carthusian French monk

Guigo II, sometimes referred to as Guy, or by the moniker "the Angelic", was a Carthusian monk and the 9th prior of Grande Chartreuse monastery, from 1174 to 1180.

He died most likely in 1188 and is distinct from both Guigo I, the 5th prior of the same monastery, and the late thirteenth-century Carthusian Guigo de Ponte.

== Life ==
Not much is known about Guigo's life. In 1173, he is called a "monk and procurator" in an agreement between the Grande Chartreuse and the nearby abbey of Chalais. In the following year, he was made prior and is called as such in two papal bulls in 1176 and 1177. Around 1180, he opposed unsuccessfully the petition of king Henry II of England to have Guigo's successor as procurator, Hugh, to be sent to the newly founded Witham Charterhouse as prior. That same year, Guigo II was replaced as prior and his death is assumed to have been in 1188. Though not much else is known, Guigo enjoyed after his death among his community a singular reputation for sanctity.

== Works ==
Three works have been attributed to Guigo: the Scala Claustralium, twelve Meditations and the separate Meditation on the Magnificat. Similar to a lot of other medieval works, most manuscripts that contain copies of these works attribute them to other authors or remain silent on who wrote them. The works cannot be dated more precisely apart from that they were written in the third quarter of the twelfth century and stylistic considerations make it seem that the Meditations were written before the Scala Claustralium. Both works indicate that Guigo was familiar with writings of Hugh of Saint Victor, with the Sermon on the Songs of Songs by Bernard of Clairvaux and also possibly with works by William of St-Thierry and Aelred of Rievaulx. Whereas more than 70 manuscripts of the Scala Claustralium survive, there are only seven complete manuscripts of the twelve Meditations, indicating that it was clearly less widely known.

=== Scala Claustralium ===
His most famous book is most commonly known today as Scala Claustralium (The Ladder of Monks), though it has also been known as the Scala paradisi (The Ladder of Paradise) and the Epistola de vita contemplativa (Letter on the Contemplative Life, which is its subtitle). Drawing from Jacob's vision in Genesis 28.12 of angels ascending and descending a ladder to God, bringing human prayers to heaven and God's answers to earth, Guigo wrote an account to explain how the ladder was meant for those in the cloister, seeking the contemplative life.

Guigo named the four steps of this "ladder" of Lectio Divina prayer, a practice which continues daily in contemporary Benedictine ritual meditation, with the Latin terms lectio, meditatio, oratio, and contemplatio. In Guigo's four stages one first reads, which leads to think about (i.e. meditate on) the significance of the text; that process in turn leads the person to respond in prayer as the third stage. The fourth stage is when the prayer, in turn, points to the gift of quiet stillness in the presence of God, called contemplation.

Scala Claustralium is considered the first description of methodical prayer in the western mystical tradition, and Guigo II is considered the first writer in the western tradition to consider stages of prayer as a ladder which leads to a closer mystic communion with God. The work was among the most popular of medieval spiritual works (in part because it commonly circulated under the name of the renowned Bernard of Clairvaux or even Augustine), with over one hundred manuscripts surviving. It was also translated into some vernacular languages, including into Middle English. It is still a basic guide for those who wish to practice lectio divina.

== See also ==
- Christian meditation

== Sources ==
- Colledge, O.S.A., Edmund; Walsh, S.J., James (1981). The ladder of monks: A letter on the contemplative life and Twelve Meditations. Kalamazoo, Mich. : Cistercian Publications. ISBN 978-0-87907-848-5.
- Robertson, Duncan (2011). Lectio Divina: The Medieval Experience of Reading. Liturgical Press. ISBN 978-0-87907-238-4.
