= Grande Chartreuse =

Head monastery of the Carthusian order

Coordinates: 45°21′48″N 5°47′37″E

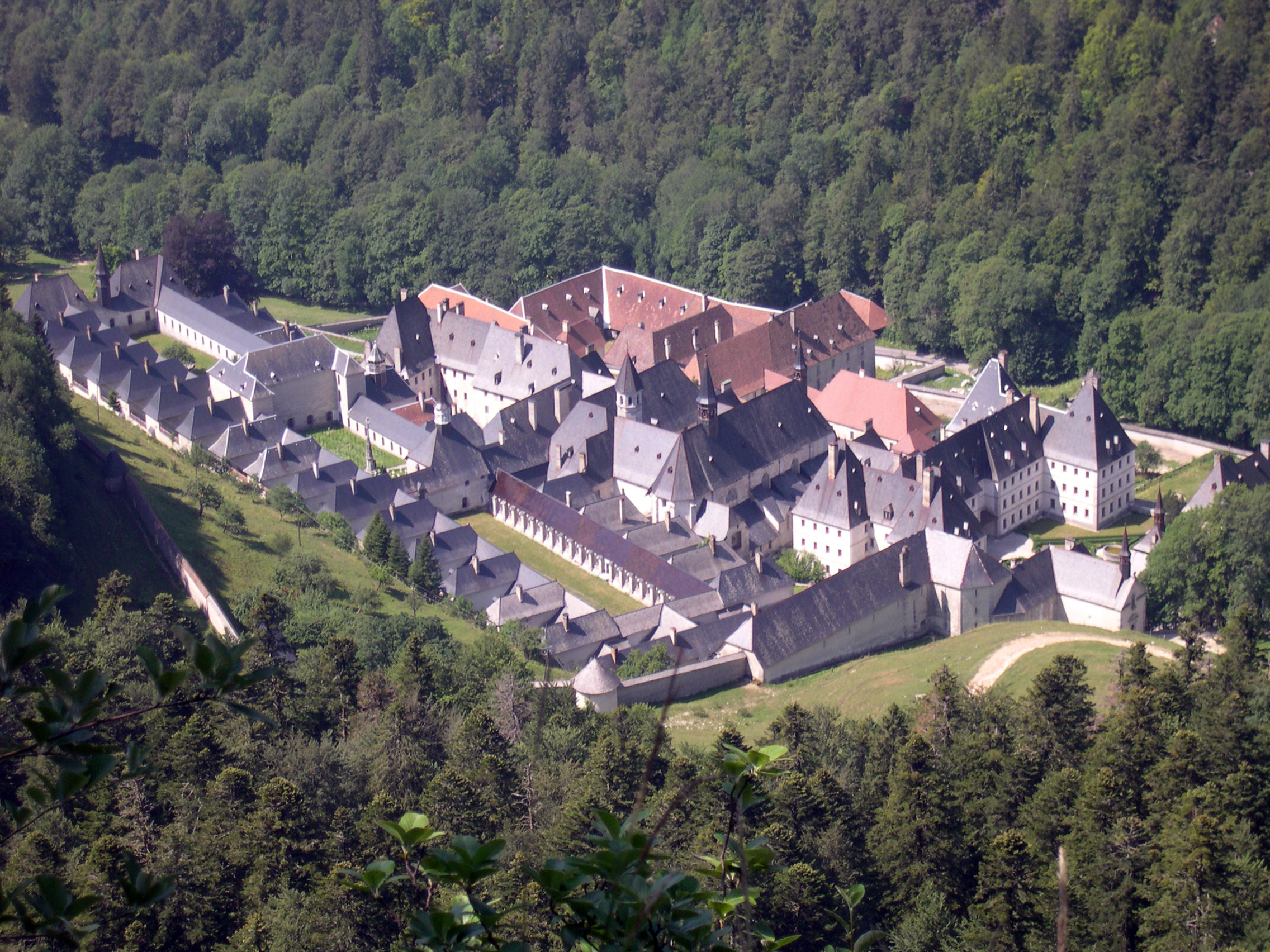
Grande Chartreuse

Grande Chartreuse (French: [ɡʁɑ̃d ʃaʁtʁøz]) is the head monastery of the Carthusian religious order. It is located in the Chartreuse Mountains, north of the city of Grenoble, in the commune of Saint-Pierre-de-Chartreuse (Isère), France.

== History ==
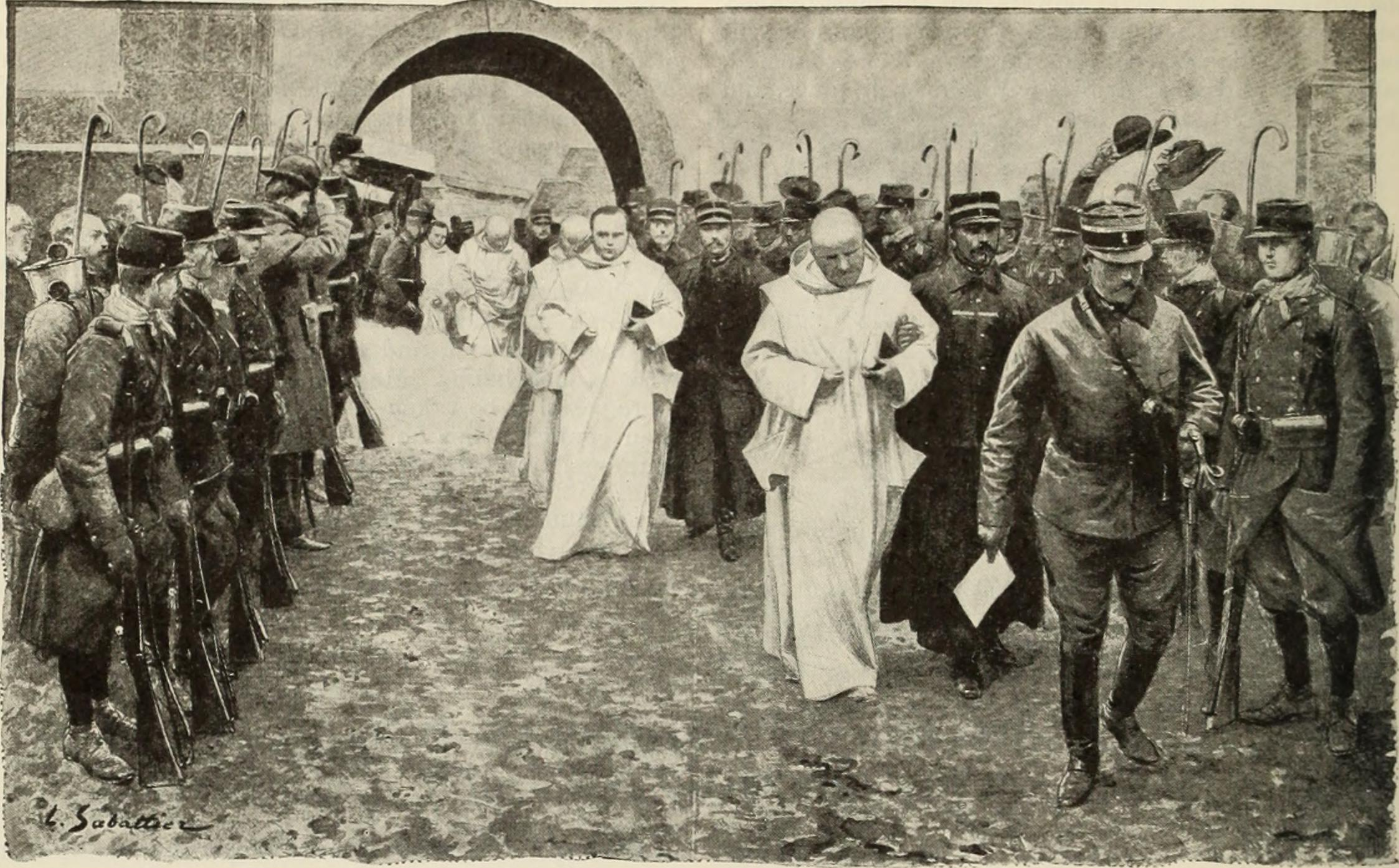
The monks being forced out of the monastery in April 1903

Originally, the château belonged to the See of Grenoble. In 1084, Saint Hugh gave it to hermit Saint Bruno and his followers who founded the Carthusian Order.

The recipe of the alcoholic beverage Chartreuse is said to have been given to the monks of Grande Chartreuse in 1605 by the French Marshal François Annibal d'Estrées. For over a century, the monks worked on perfecting the 130-ingredient recipe. In 1764, the monks expanded their distillery for the first time to meet the demand of their popular Elixir Végétal de la Grande Chartreuse. The distillery has then been moved several times in more remote areas because it represents a major explosion hazard for the surrounding habitations.

The château went through many severe casualties, reconstructions and renovations. The current building was erected in 1688. In 1790, following the French Revolution, the monks were expelled from the monastery, and waited until 1838 to be reauthorized on the premises.

The massive collection of 400 manuscripts and 3,500 printed documents (including 300 incunabula) taken from the Grande Chartreuse during the French Revolution is curated and protected in the bibliothèque d’étude et du patrimoine of Grenoble, and an online scanned version of the documents is available on the digital platform of the library, Pagella, for researchers and interested people alike.

Following the establishment of the Association Law of 1901 and its interpretation that effectively banned religious associations en masse, many notable religious institutions across France, including the Grande Chartreuse, were closed by the French government. While some monks found refuge in Italy until 1929, others settled in the Catalan city of Tarragona and relaunched the monastery's famous liqueur-producing activity. The Grande Chartreuse was sold in 1927 to a group of local entrepreneurs who invited the monks back to their monastery.

In 1940, the Grande Chartreuse was reopened under the Petain regime. At the end of World War II, the Grande Chartreuse was used as a hospital by the Allied Forces.

== Description ==
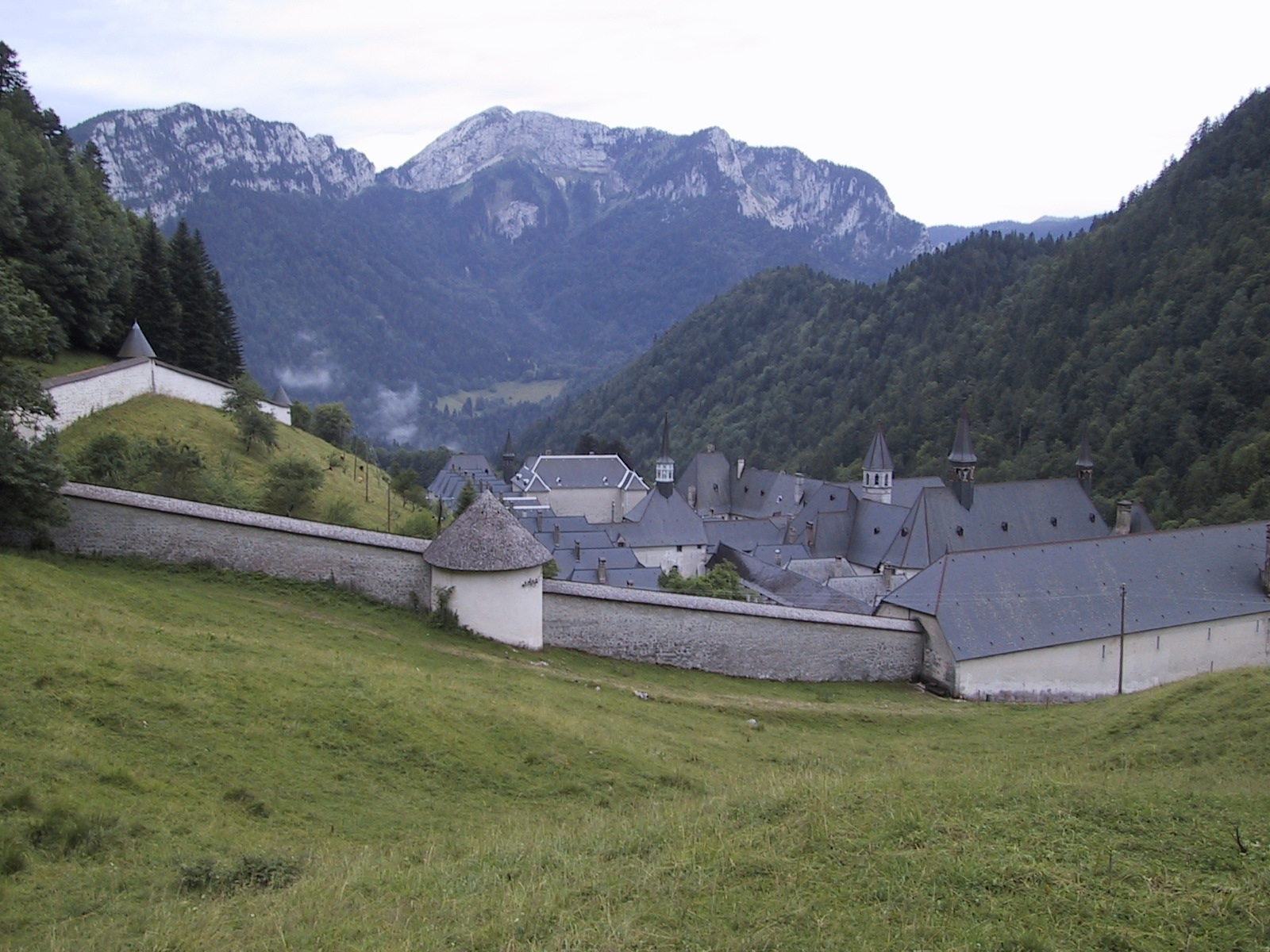
Grande Chartreuse is situated in a remote mountain valley.

Visitors are not permitted at the Grande Chartreuse, and motor vehicles are prohibited on the surrounding roads.

A museum of the Carthusian order and the lives of its monks and nuns is located about two kilometers away. The order is supported by the sales of Chartreuse liqueur which has been popular in France and later around the world since the early 18th century. In 2015, the order sold 1.5 million bottles of Chartreuse (50 euros a bottle), and all the proceedings went into financing the order and its charity projects.

== In popular culture ==
=== Literature ===
The Italian canon Antonio de Beatis described the former monastery in his 1517-1518 travel journal; he wrote that the original monastery was destroyed in an avalanche long before, killing many of the monks. English poet Matthew Arnold wrote his poem Stanzas from the Grande Chartreuse while briefly staying at the monastery around 1851 on his honeymoon. The poem is mostly set within the monastery, where Arnold uses his observations on the monks' abstinent lifestyle to explore and wrestle with his agnosticism. The Grande Chartreuse was also described by William Wordsworth in his 1792 Descriptive Sketches (lines 53-73), and The Prelude, Book VI (Wordsworth visited the monastery in 1790, but he describes the 1792 expulsion of the monks by French forces). The monastery is given a chapter in John Ruskin's Praeterita. Alice Muriel Williamson, in her 1905 travel romance novel "The Princess Passes" Chapter 28, had her characters visit the recently abandoned monastery, seeing and describing the cells, gardens, and kitchen ware still in place, and described the empty place as a body without a soul.

=== Film ===
Into Great Silence, a documentary by Philip Gröning on the monastery, was released in 2005.

== List of priors ==
The following prior are listed in the Dictionnaire d'Histoire et de Géographie Ecclésiastique:

- 1084–1090 : Bruno I
- 1090–1100 : Landuin
- 1100–1101 : Peter I
- 1101–1109 : John I
- 1109–1136 : Guigo I
- 1136–1139 : Hugh I
- 1139–1151 : Anthelm of Belley
- 1151–1174 : Basil
- 1174–1180 : Guigo II
- 1180–1233 : Jancelin
- 1233–1236 : Martin
- 1236–1242 : Peter II
- 1242–1247 : Hugh II (first time)
- 1247–1249 : Bernard I de La Tour (first time)
- 1249–1253 : Hugh II (second time)
- 1253–1257 : Bernard I de La Tour (second time)
- 1257–1267 : Riffier
- 1267–1272 : Gerard
- 1272–1276 : Guillaume I Fabri
- 1276–1277 : Pierre III de Montignac
- 1277–1313 : Boson
- 1313–1329 : Aymon of Aosta
- 1329–1330 : Jacques de Vevey (first time)
- 1330–1338 : Clair de Fontenay (first time)
- 1338–1341 : Jacques de Vevey (second time)
- 1341–1341 : Clair de Fontenay (second time)
- 1341–1346 : Henri Pollet
- 1346–1361 : Jean II Birelle
- 1361–1367 : Elzéar de Grimoard
- 1367–1402 : Guillaume II de Raynal
- 1402–1410 : Bonifaci Ferrer
- 1410–1420 : Jean III de Griffenberg
- 1420–1437 : Guillaume III de Lamotte
- 1437–1463 : François I Maresme
- 1463–1472 : Jean IV Van Rosendael
- 1472–1481 : Antoine I Dellieux
- 1481–1494 : Antoine II du Charne
- 1494–1503 : Pierre IV Roux
- 1503–1521 : François II du Puy
- 1521–1535 : Guillaume IV Biebuick
- 1535–1540 : Jean V Guilhard
- 1540–1546 : Pierre V Marnef
- 1546–1553 : Jean VI Volon
- 1553–1554 : Damien Longoni
- 1554–1566 : Pierre VI Sarde
- 1566–1586 : Bernard II Carasse
- 1586–1588 : Jérôme I Lignano
- 1588–1594 : Jérôme II Marchant
- 1594–1600 : Jean–Michel de Vesly
- 1600–1631 : Bruno II d'Affringues
- 1631–1643 : Juste Perrot
- 1643–1649 : Léon Tixier
- 1649–1675 : Jean VII Pégon
- 1675–1703 : Innocent Le Masson
- 1703–1731 : Antoine III de Montgeffond
- 1731–1732 : Ambroise Crollet
- 1732–1737 : Étienne I Richard
- 1737–1758 : Michel I Brunier de Larnage
- 1758–1778 : Étienne II Biclet
- 1778–1791 : Hilarion Robinet
- 1791–1801 : Nicolas–Albergati de Geoffroy
- 1801–1813 : Antoine IV Vallet
- 1813–1816 : Romuald Moissonnier
- 1816–1816 : Bonaventure Eymin
- 1816–1824 : Grégoire Sorel
- 1824–1831 : Benoît Nizzati
- 1831–1863 : Jean–Baptiste Mortaize
- 1863–1877 : Charles–Marie Saisson
- 1877–1879 : Roch Boussinet
- 1879–1892 : Anselme–Marie Bruniaux
- 1892–1905 : Michel II Baglin
- 1905–1911 : René Herbault
- 1911–1938 : Jacques–Marie Mayaud
- 1938–1967 : Ferdinand Vidal
- 1967–1997 : André Poisson
- 1997–2012 : Marcellin Theeuwes
- 2012–2014 : François–Marie Velut
- 2014–présent : Dysmas de Lassus

== See also ==
- List of Carthusian monasteries
- Chartreuse (liqueur)
