= Guigo de Ponte =

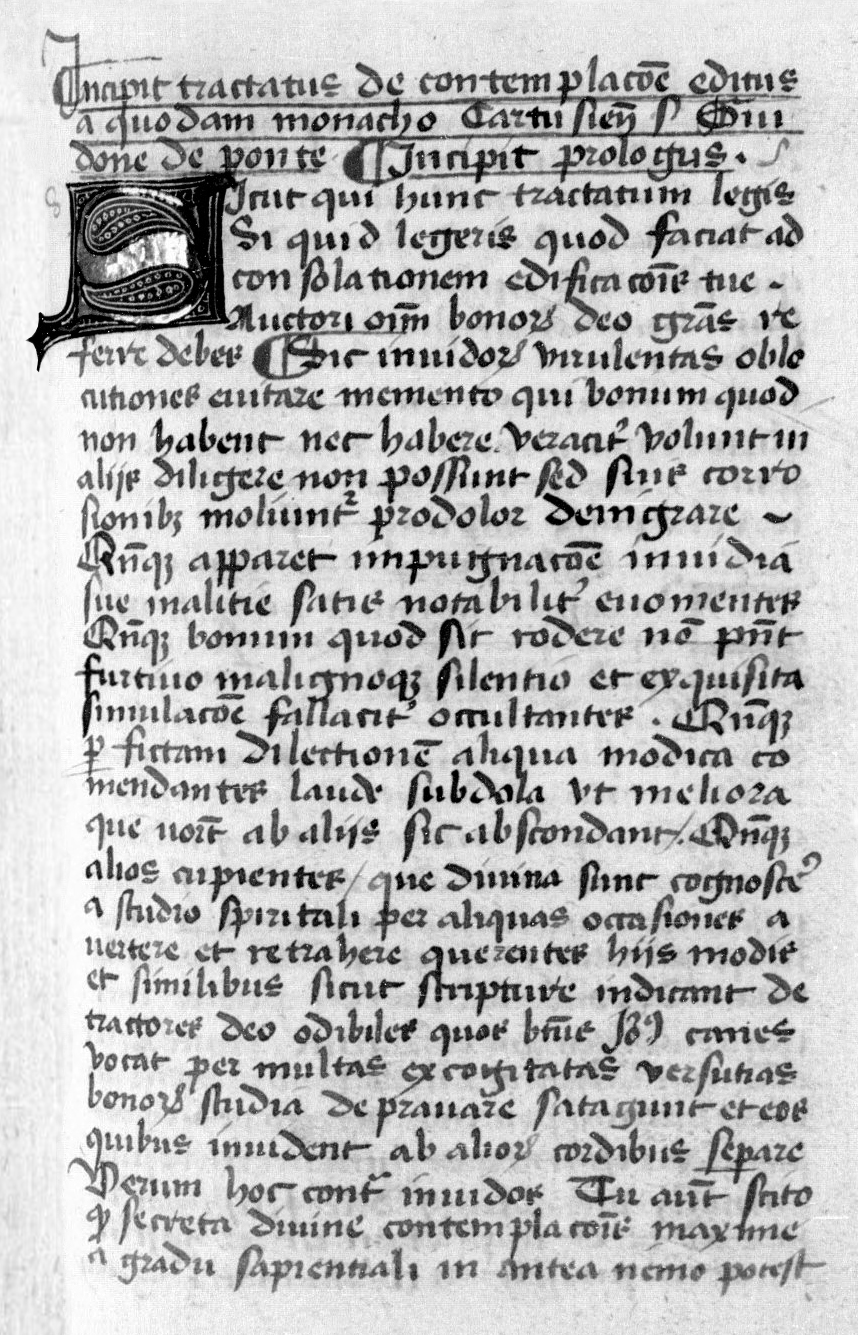
Start of Guigo's De vita contemplativa in a 15th-century manuscript

Guigo de Ponte, also known as Guigues du Pont, was a Carthusian monk of the Grande Chartreuse. Little is known about him, but he probably professed there in 1271, and died in 1297.

He is known for his treatise De vita contemplativa, also known as De Contemplatione. This has sometimes been attributed to Guigo I (d.1136), the fifth prior of the Grande Chartreuse. However, it cannot have been written by Guigo I, because it refers to several writings of thirteenth-century scholastic theology, as well as to Hugh of Balma's Viae Syon Lugent. Part of it (Book II, chapters 1–5) was taken up nearly verbatim by the fourteenth-century Carthusian Ludolph of Saxony (d.1377) in his Vita Christi. One of those who read Ludolph was Ignatius of Loyola, so indirectly, Guigo's thought entered early modern Catholic spiritual writing. Though it was known and used by a number of late medieval Carthusians, though (as well as Ludolph of Saxony it is used by Denis of Rijkel, and possibly Nicholas Kempf), it survives in only five manuscripts, so was clearly not widely read outside these circles.
