= Dysmas de Lassus =

French Catholic monk (born 1956)

- Born: Michel de Lassus Saint-Geniès; March 30, 1956 (age 70); Versailles, France
- Title: Minister General of the Carthusians
- Predecessor: François–Marie Velut
- Parents: Arnaud de Lassus (father); Agnès de Chaumont-Quitry (mother)
- Website: chartreux.org

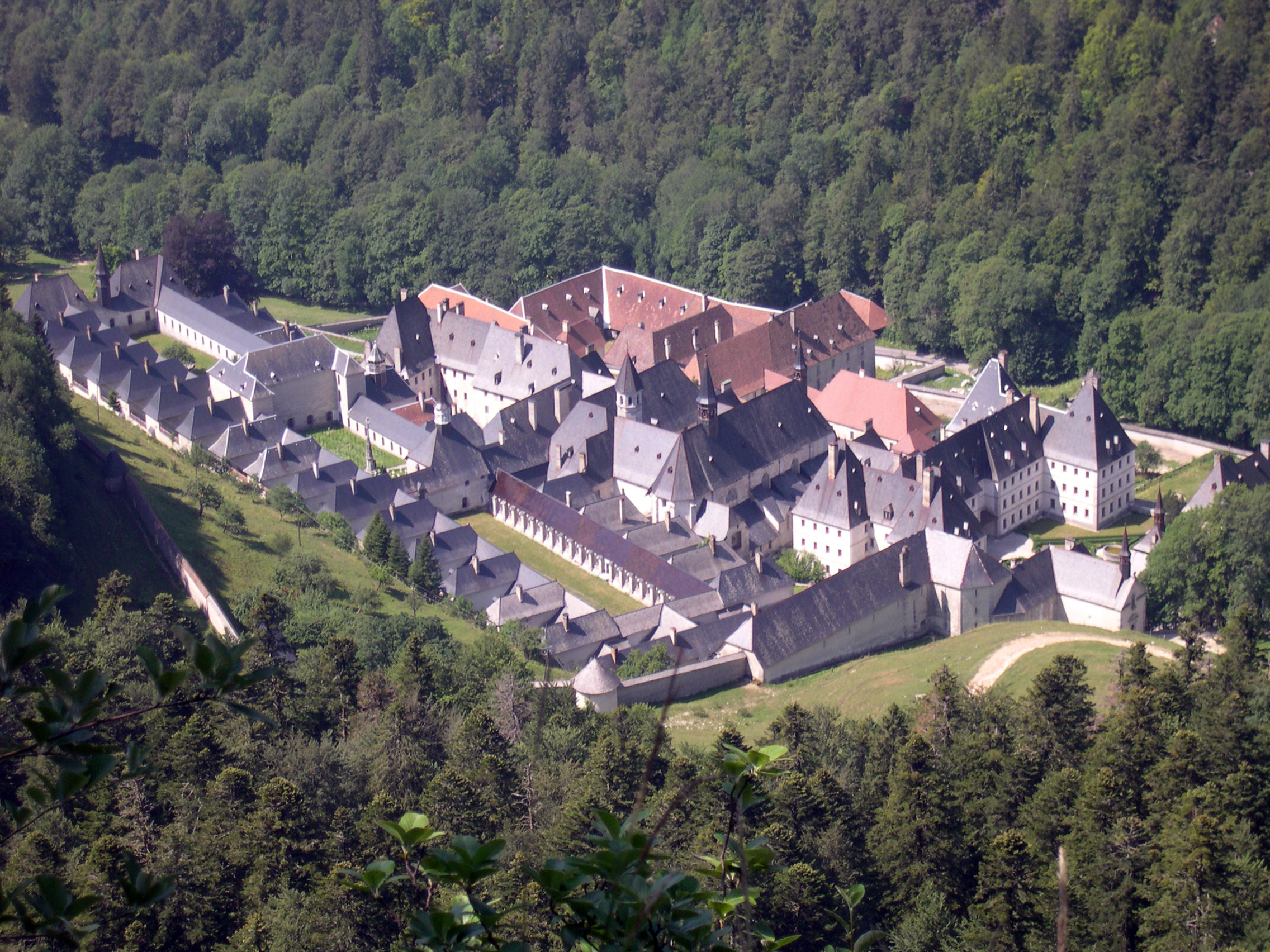
La Grande Chartreuse

Michel de Lassus Saint-Geniès (born March 30, 1956), better known as Dysmas de Lassus, is a French Catholic monk, the prior general of the Carthusians since 2014.

== Biography ==
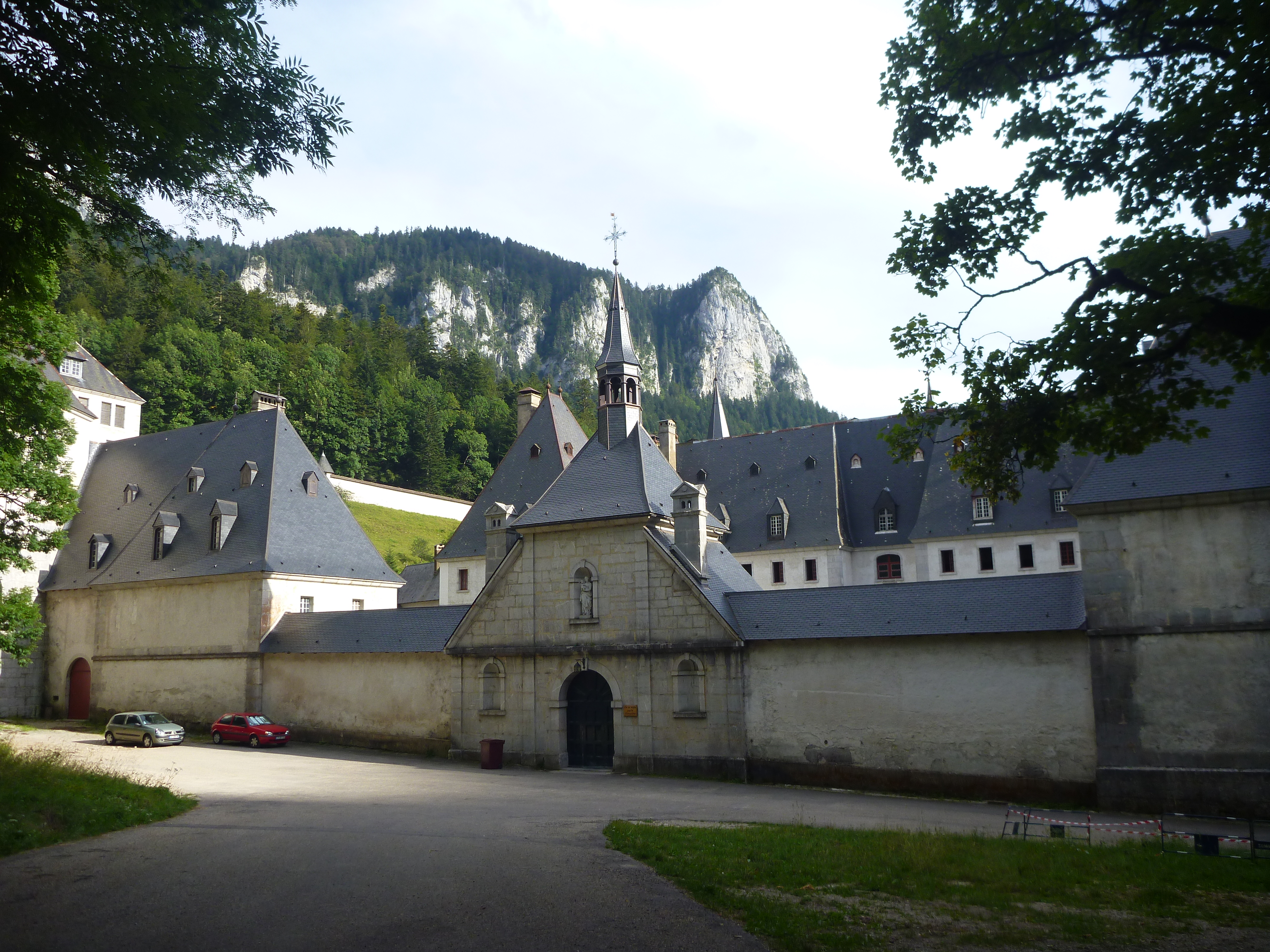
Entrance of Grande Chartreuse.

Michel de Lassus Saint-Geniès was born on March 30, 1956. His father, Arnaud de Lassus, was a marine engineer, member of Cité catholique, and founder of Action Family and School. Michel grew up with six siblings, one of whom became a Carmelite in the convent of Créteil, taking the name of Sister Aude of the Virgin Mary. He entered the Charterhouse at the age of 20 and took the name of Dysmas, in reference to the penitent thief in the Gospel. In 1990, he became the master of novices at the Grande Chartreuse before being elected prior of the Chartreuse de Portes on October 1, 2012.

On November 3, 2014, he was elected prior general by the monks of the Grande Chartreuse. A couple of days later, on November 7, the Father Priors of all the Carthusians of the order confirmed this choice by their vote.

Dysmas de Lassus became the 74th successor of Saint Bruno of Cologne at the head of the Carthusian Order, succeeding Dom François-Marie Valut, who resigned for health reasons.

He participated in the writing of Cardinal Robert Sarah's book, The Power of Silence: Against the Dictatorship of Noise, written with Nicolas Diat, and published in October 2016.

In March 2020, at éditions du Cerf, he published "Risques et dérives de la vie religieuse", offering diagnostic elements that will help measure the dangers of certain spiritual practices or the governance of religious communities. This work is prefaced by José Rodríguez Carballo, Secretary of the Congregation for institutes of Consecrated Life and Societies of Apostolic Life.

In March 2023, he announced that the company producing Chartreuse liqueur will cease its growth. The monks are still involved in the production.

== Publications ==
- Formation d'un jeune Père-Maître. La Grande Chartreuse. 1990. p. 41.
- Remarques sur la tâche du Père-Maître. La Grande Chartreuse. 1997. p. 36.
- Avec Augustin Devaux (1997). Le Projet de graduel de chœur. La Grande Chartreuse. p. 153.
- De Lassus, Dysmas (2020). Risques et dérives de la vie religieuse [Abuses in the Religious Life and Path to Healing]. (foreword: José Rodríguez Carballo). Le Cerf. p. 446. ISBN 978-1-64413-534-1.
