= Hendrik Herp =

Dutch or Flemish Franciscan and writer on mysticism

Personal life
- Born: c. 1400 Erp, The Netherlands or Erps-Kwerps, Belgium
- Died: February 22, 1477 (aged 76–77) Bergen op Zoom, The Netherlands

Hendrik Herp (died 22 February 1477), known in Latin as Henricus Harphius, was a Dutch or Flemish Observant Franciscan, and a writer on mysticism.

== Life ==
Herp was born around 1400 either at Erp near Veghel or Erps-Kwerps near Leuven. He is possibly the same person as Heinricus Erppe, clericus Cameracensis dioceses, who in 1426, as one of the first students, was registered at the University of Leuven. "Clericus Cameracensis dioceses" means that this student had held a clerical position in the diocese of Kamerijk, leading some to propose that he was not born in Erp, which is widely believed to be his birthplace but belonged to the diocese of Liège, but in Erps near Leuven, which was near the edge of the diocese of Kamerijk. The first undisputed reference to his life is in 1445, when he is rector of the Brethren of the Common Life at Delft, suggesting that he had previously joined the Brethren, either in Zwolle or Deventer. The next year he founded a Brethren community in nearby Gouda, which he led until 1450, "to the great good of his subjects". In Gouda, Herp had extensive contact with Franciscans, and in 1450, on a pilgrimage to Rome, he took the habit of St. Francis, joining the Franciscan Observance (the Capuchin reform) at the Convent of Ara Cœli. On his return to the Low Countries in 1454, he served as the guardian of the Franciscan convent in Mechelen until 1457. In 1460 he was guardian of a convent in Antwerp. He later served in several posts for the Franciscan Cologne Province, which covered much of the Northern Netherlands, including as Provincial superior (1470–73). Under his leadership, convents were started in Bolsward, Amersfoort and Herentals. Herp traveled a lot, having meetings (kapittels) in Gouda in 1471, in Alkmaar in 1472, and in Bergen op Zoom in 1473. At the latter meeting Henricus de Bercha is chosen as his successor. In 1474 he returns as guardian of the convent of Mechlin, where he died in 1477.

== Works ==
Herp wrote his works between 1450 and 1475. An early work is called The Contemplative Eden.

This is succeeded by his major work, probably written in the 1460s, entitled Spieghel der volcomenheit (The Mirror of Perfection). As a whole and in the chief divisions of his doctrine, Herp shows several points of contact with his fellow Brabantian John of Ruusbroec.

== Later reception ==
This work was widely read: the modern edition of the text uses 48 manuscripts and lists 66 edition in many languages, beginning with the first Dutch printing in 1475. Much of this diffusion was due to the Latin translation prepared by the Cologne Carthusian Peter Blomeveen, published in 1509 under the title Aureum directorum contemplativorum (The Golden Directory of Contemplatives).

In 1538, the Cologne Carthusians, led by Dietrich Loher, also published an anthology of Herp’s writings under the title De mystica theologica (On Mystical Theology), with a dedication to George Skotborg, Bishop of Lund. This anthology comprises three parts: "Soliloquium divini Amoris", "Directorium Aureum contemplativorum", and "Paradisus contemplativorum". In other words, the Latin translation of The Mirror comprised book two. This edition was important for the later reception of Herp, since it was reprinted five times before 1611, and translated into French and German.

However, Herp’s work was not always received positively – in 1559, the 1556 edition of De mystica theologica, dedicated to Ignatius Loyola by Loher, was placed on the Index of Forbidden Books for a number of theological errors (though not heresies). This was renewed in 1580 and 1583. Many still found the book useful, however. In 1586 a version corrected by the Dominican theologian Peter Paul Philippus (d. c.1648) was printed in Rome. There is also an "Index Expurgatorius" (Paris, 1598), where can be found, as well as in the "Index of Sotomayor" (1640), the opinions to be corrected.

He was praised by Mabillon, Bona, and others. Of his works, only one was printed during his lifetime, Speculum aureum decem præceptorum Dei (Mainz, 1474); it is a collection of 213 sermons on the Commandments for the use of preachers and confessors. Another collection of 222 sermons (Sermones de tempore, de sanctis, etc.) was printed in 1484, etc. Both frequently quote the Doctors of the Middle Ages, especially Thomas Aquinas, Alexander of Hales, Bernard of Clairvaux, etc., and were often reprinted.

== Influence ==
Some of the early modern mystics who knew and used Herp include Francisco de Osuna, Bernardino de Laredo, Angelus Silesius, Benet Canfield, Augustine Baker, the author of The Evangelical Pearl, Louis de Blois, Cardinal Berulle, Constantine Barbanson, and John of Saint-Samson.

The Franciscan Chapter of Toledo in 1663 recommended his works as standard writings in mystic theology.

The Franciscan Martyrology of Arturus of Rouen gives him the title of Blessed.

== Modern editions ==
- Lucidius Verschueren, Hendrik Herp OFM Spieghel der Volcomenheit, 2 vols, (Antwerp: 1931) [Second volume contains the text of the work in Dutch and Latin on facing pages]
- Rik Van Nieuwenhove, Late Medieval Mystics of the Low Countries, pp144-164 [English translation of the third part of Spieghel der Volcomenheit]
- William Short, 'Hendrik Herp: The Mirror of Perfection, or Directory of Contemplatives ', in Michael Cusato and Jean Francoise Godet-Calogeras, eds, Vita Evangelica: Essays in Honour of Margaret Carney, OSF, Franciscan Studies 64, (2006), pp407-433. [English translation of the Spanish version of the third part of Spieghel der Volcomenheit]
