= Maria Petyt =

17th century Flemish mystic

Venerable Maria Petyt
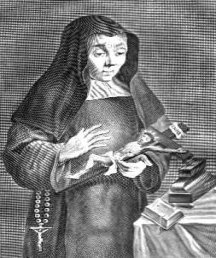
- Marie of Saint Theresa dressed in the habit of the Carmelite sisters
- Born: 1 January 1623; Hazebrouck, Spanish Empire
- Died: 1 November 1677 (aged 54)

Maria Petyt, also Petijt or Petiyt (1 January 1623 – 1 November 1677), was known as a "great mystic". Her writings have been cited as "unequaled in volume and mystical content within the historical context of the Flemish-speaking 17th century."

== Early life ==
Maria Petyt was born in Hazebrouck on 1 January 1623, in the French part of Flanders near Dunkirk in present-day France, to parents who owned a fabric shop. Tragedy struck the young family numerous times: two sisters died while young, another died while only a teenager and her half-brother Ignace died by drowning. After a bout with smallpox at age eight, Maria was left with many facial marks, but despite these trials she remained an enthusiastic child, full of wit and joy.

It was while preparing for her first communion at the age of 10 that Maria made a vow to become a nun and to consecrate herself to God.

== Spiritual life ==
In 1640, against her father's wishes, she lived for a time in a convent of Augustinian sisters in Ghent but did not join that order because, with her bad vision, "she cannot see the letters of the choral prayer." Instead she became a nun with Carmelite Third Order and took the name Marie of Saint Theresa (in French, Marie de Sainte Thérèse). In 1642, she entered the Beguinage of Ghent and took the sacred vows of obedience and chastity. In 1646, the direction of the Beguinage community was entrusted to a professor of philosophy, Michael of St. Augustine (born Jan van Ballaert), who became her spiritual director. Michael of St. Augustine, noticing Maria's spiritual work and mystical graces, suggested that she retire to a more solitary place. In October 1657, she moved to the beguinage in Mechelen near the Carmelite church where she began her solitary life of study and writing. In 1659, she took the vow of poverty and renewed her vows of obedience and chastity.

She read many spiritual works such as the writings of John of the Cross, Teresa of Avila, John of Ruusbroec, Eckhart von Hochheim, and John Tauler.

Around 1662, Michael of St. Augustine asked her to write a memoir of her spiritual and mystical experiences. The resulting autobiography titled La vie de Marie Petyt (The Life of Maria Petyt) was published after her death.

== Death and burial ==
After an extended sickness, Maria died on 1 November 1677, and was buried in Mechelen in present-day Belgium. During the years of the French Revolution (1789-1798), the convent was closed. It was ultimately destroyed in 1804, and at that time her tomb was opened but discovered empty. Researchers have proposed that the Carmelite sisters buried Maria's body in a safer, unknown place for security reasons.

== Beatification ==
Maria Petyt was declared "venerable" by the Catholic Church. She is also considered a "mystic" of the Carmelite Order.
