= Hugh of Balma =

Hugh of Balma, also known as Hugo of Palma or Hugh of Dorche, was a Carthusian theologian, is generally acknowledged to be the author of the work which titled Viae Syon Lugent (The Roads to Zion Mourn), after its opening line. That work is also known as De Mystica Theologia, De Theologia Mystica and De Triplici Via. It is a comprehensive treatment of the Mystical Theology of Pseudo-Dionysius the Areopagite. The work was attributed to Saint Bonaventure in medieval and early modern times, but this attribution was firmly rejected and attributed to Hugh by the Franciscans of Quaracchi, editors of the critical edition of Bonaventure's work, in 1895.

Hugh's identity is unclear. Since the seventeenth century, he has typically been identified with Hugh of Dorche, prior of the Carthusian Charterhouse of Meyriat in Bresse, between Geneva and Lyon, from 1293–95 and 1303–05. The 1907 Catholic Encyclopedia cites a tradition now discredited that Hugh of Balma was a 'Franciscan theologian, born at Genera' who died in 1439, and the confessor of St Colette. The most likely theory is that he was Hugh of Dorche, a Carthusian prior of Meyriat.

Hugh has been identified with the assertion that one can rise to God by love alone, without any cognition accompanying or leading the way. However, it has been suggested that this arose in particular because of a misreading of Hugh in the 1450s, during controversy over the definition of mystical theology involving the Carthusian Vincent of Aggsbach, Nicholas of Cusa and the abbot of the Benedictine monastery of Tegernsee, Bernard of Waging.

== Viae Syon Lugent ==
Although the work Viae Syon Lugent is likely to have been written in the second half of the thirteenth century, it is hard to date more precisely. It is likely to have been written subsequently to Thomas Gallus’s Explanatio Mysticae Theologiae (ca.1241?), from which Hugh quotes, but was composed before the death in 1297 of the Frenchman Guigo of Ponte, who in his De Contemplatione alludes to Hugh’s work.

Viae Syon Lugent had an impact on subsequent late medieval writers: more than one hundred full or partial manuscripts of Viae Syon Lugent survive. It received many Latin printings from the fifteenth century onwards, generally within collections of Bonaventure's works. Because it was understood to be by Bonaventure, it was partially translated into German in the fifteenth century. It was also printed in Spanish in Toledo in 1514 as Sol des contemplativos, an edition which influenced Francisco de Osuna's The Third Spiritual Alphabet, and perhaps subsequent Spanish Carmelite spiritual writing. It has been suggested that its thought may have influenced the author of The Cloud of Unknowing.
