= Francisco de Osuna =

Spanish Franciscan friar and author

Francisco de Osuna, O.F.M. (1492 or 1497 – c. 1540), was a Spanish Franciscan friar and author of some of the most influential works on spirituality in Spain in the 16th century.

His book The Third Spiritual Alphabet influenced Saint Teresa of Jesus. It is considered a masterpiece of Franciscan mysticism and a foundational text of the recogimiento movement. His premise in the book is that friendship and communion with God are possible in this life through cleansing one's conscience, entering one's heart, resting in loving stillness, and then rising above the heart to God alone.

== Life ==
=== Early life ===
Francis was born in the village of Osuna, in the province of Seville, in either 1492 or 1497 (he himself was unsure), of poor peasants whose names are not recorded. In his writings, he described his ancestors as having long been in the service of the Counts of Ureña. Francis himself entered military service while in his teens, in the course of which he saw action at the conquest of Tripoli (25 August 1510) by Spain under Pedro Navarro, Count of Oliveto.

After his return to Spain from the campaign, Francisco chose to embark on a career in the Church. To this end he enrolled at the University of Seville, where he studied Latin and rhetoric. Shortly after this, he set out with a friend on a pilgrimage to the great shrine of St. James the Greater at Santiago de Compostela. In the course of this journey, according to his own account, he apparently had a religious experience. He completed his studies in 1513, whereupon he received the habit of the Observant branch of the Order of Friars Minor, with the Province of Castile. This was a reform movement in the Order then becoming widespread in Spain, which sought to re-establish the primacy of prayer and poor living as practiced by their holy founder, St. Francis of Assisi.

=== Friar ===
Francisco made his profession of religious vows in 1514, under the reformist leader, Francisco de Quiñones, Vicar of the province and later Minister General of the whole Order. He then resumed his studies, first at the province's House of Philosophy in Torrelaguna (1514-1518), followed by theological studies at the Complutense University, then still in Alcalá (1518-1522). There he mastered the three schools of theology being taught in his day, viz., Scotism, Scholasticism and the Nominalism of Gabriel Biel.

In 1523, Osuna entered the Salceda retreat house, situated near Guadalajara, one of eight retreat houses in the province of Castile. It was an isolated house, large enough to accommodate up to 24 religious, and with five hermitages in the surrounding hills, so that one could spend up to a week in perfect seclusion.

Osuna’s life there was strictly regulated and dedicated to prayer and meditation. As part of this, he practiced recollection. In order to develop his inner prayer life, he formulated maxims as a guide for meditation, which he arranged alphabetically. He composed three such alphabets. The Tercer Abercedario (1527), the Primero (1528), the Segundo, Cuarto o Ley de amor, Gracioso convite (1530), Norte de estados (1531).

At the end of 1536 or beginning of 1537, Osuna returned to Spain. In these years, he composed the Fifth Alphabet, and the Sixth Alphabet. Between 1537 and 1540, the First, Second and Third Alphabets, and the Gracioso convite were reedited, though it is unclear whether Osuna himself was involved in this process. He died at some point between the end of 1540 and 31 March 1542. A note in a new edition of the Fifth Alphabet, dated 31 March 1542, advised readers of Osuna’s death.

=== Mystical teacher ===
In fact, Osuna was the most read spiritual author in Spain between 1527 and 1559. His Spanish works emerged in 40 editions, and his Latin works in 23 editions. The Third Spiritual Alphabet was begun at Salceda, and probably finished at Escalona, where it is believed Osuna spent some time between 1526 and 1530; it was first published in 1527 in Toledo. The popularity of the work is shown by the fact it enjoyed several editions in the following decades (1527, 1537, 1544, 1554, 1555, 1638, 1911). Barring Fidèle Ros’s (1936) study of Osuna, most studies have been partial. The standard Spanish language edition of the Third Spiritual Alphabet is that of Miguel Mir (Madrid, 1911), but it contains numerous errors and important omissions, in part as it is based on the 1544 Burgos edition, not the original 1527 Toledo edition – around 50 lines of text are omitted, and numerous words misspelt as different words. A 1972 edition, based on the 1527 text, attempted to rectify this problem.

== Bibliography ==
- Francisco de Osuna, Third Spiritual Alphabet. Translated from the Spanish by a Benedictine of Stanbrook (Berzinger Brothers, 1931)
- Francisco de Osuna, Third Spiritual Alphabet (New York / London: Paulist Press / SPCK, 1981), ISBN 0-8091-2145-X
- Francisco de Osuna, Third Spiritual Alphabet. A comparative study of the two English translations and their footnotes (2016), ISBN 978-1365115387
- Francisco de Osuna, Tercer Abecedario espiritual, estudio histórico y edición crítica por Melquíades Andrés (Madrid: Biblioteca de Autores Cristianos, 1972)
- Fidèle de Ros, Le Pére François d’Osuna. (Un maître de Sainte Thérèse.) Sa vie, son œuvre, sa doctrine spirituelle (Paris, 1936)
