= 1883 =

1883 in various calendars
- Gregorian calendar: 1883; MDCCCLXXXIII
- Ab urbe condita: 2636
- Armenian calendar: 1332; ԹՎ ՌՅԼԲ
- Assyrian calendar: 6633
- Baháʼí calendar: 39–40
- Balinese saka calendar: 1804–1805
- Bengali calendar: 1289–1290
- Berber calendar: 2833
- British Regnal year: 46 Vict. 1 – 47 Vict. 1
- Buddhist calendar: 2427
- Burmese calendar: 1245
- Byzantine calendar: 7391–7392
- Chinese calendar: 壬午年 (Water Horse); 4580 or 4373 — to — 癸未年 (Water Goat); 4581 or 4374
- Coptic calendar: 1599–1600
- Discordian calendar: 3049
- Ethiopian calendar: 1875–1876
- Hebrew calendar: 5643–5644
- Hindu calendars
- Vikram Samvat: 1939–1940
- Shaka Samvat: 1804–1805
- Kali Yuga: 4983–4984
- Holocene calendar: 11883
- Igbo calendar: 883–884
- Iranian calendar: 1261–1262
- Islamic calendar: 1300–1301
- Japanese calendar: Meiji 16 (明治１６年)
- Javanese calendar: 1812–1813
- Julian calendar: Gregorian minus 12 days
- Korean calendar: 4216
- Minguo calendar: 29 before ROC 民前29年
- Nanakshahi calendar: 415
- Thai solar calendar: 2425–2426
- Tibetan calendar: ཆུ་ཕོ་རྟ་ལོ་ (male Water-Horse); 2009 or 1628 or 856 — to — ཆུ་མོ་ལུག་ལོ་ (female Water-Sheep); 2010 or 1629 or 857

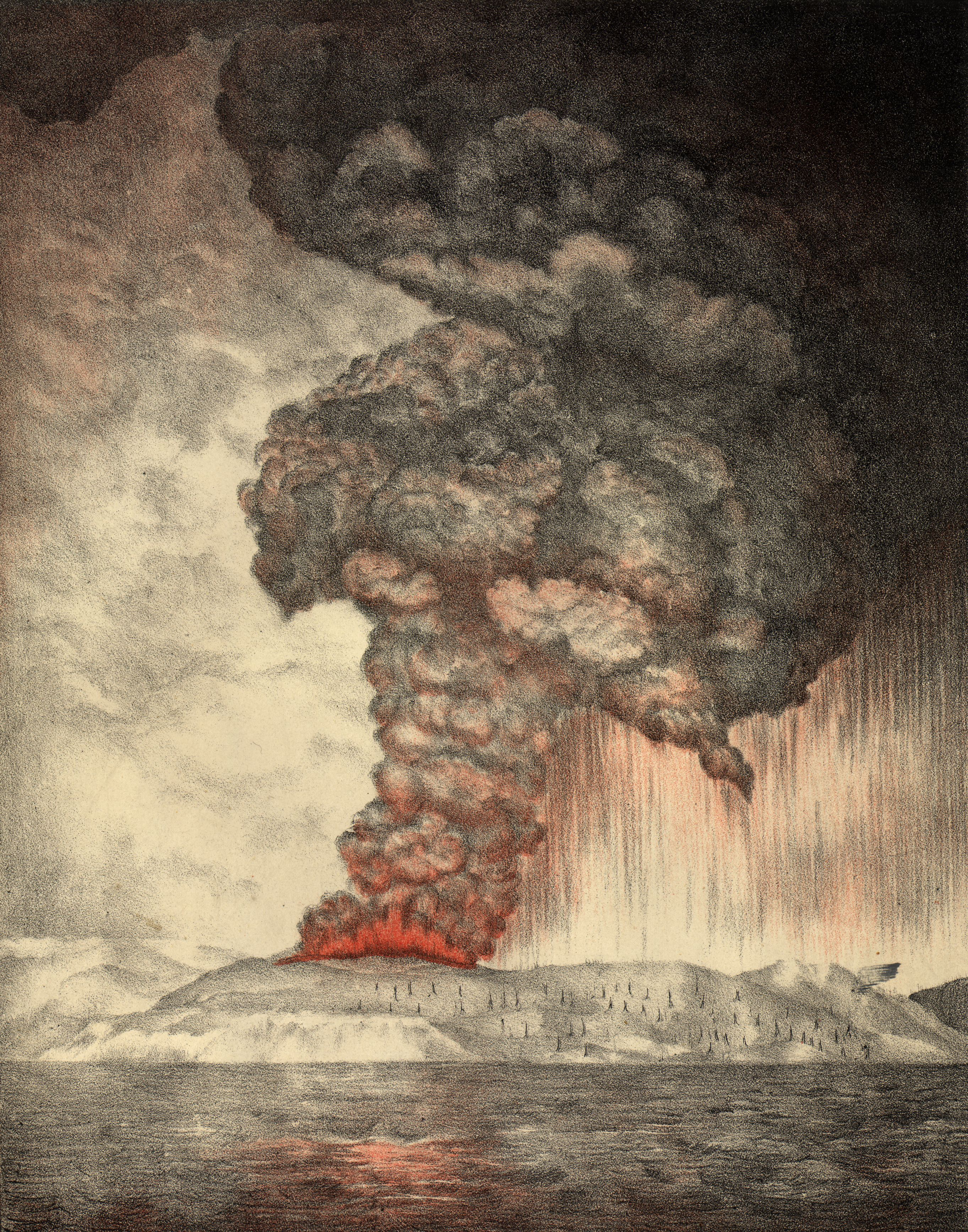
A lithograph of the 1883 eruption of Krakatoa, during its earlier phase in May.

1883 (MDCCCLXXXIII) was a common year starting on Monday of the Gregorian calendar and a common year starting on Saturday of the Julian calendar, the 1883rd year of the Common Era (CE) and Anno Domini (AD) designations, the 883rd year of the 2nd millennium, the 83rd year of the 19th century, and the 4th year of the 1880s decade. As of the start of 1883, the Gregorian calendar was 12 days ahead of the Julian calendar, which remained in localized use until 1923.

== Events ==
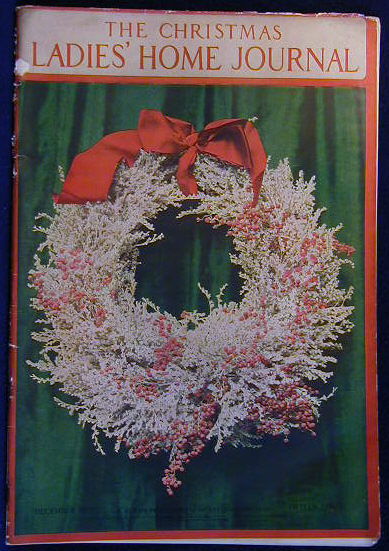
February 16: Ladies Home Journal begins (photo 1906).

=== January ===
- January 8 — January 19 – Trial of the 66 in Lyon, targeting the Black International in France.
- January 10 – A fire at the Newhall Hotel in Milwaukee, Wisconsin, United States, kills 73 people.
- January 16 – The Pendleton Civil Service Reform Act, establishing the United States civil service, is passed.
- January 19 – The first electric lighting system employing overhead wires begins service in Roselle, New Jersey, United States, installed by Thomas Edison.

=== February ===
- February 15 – Tokyo Electrical Lightning Grid, predecessor of Tokyo Electrical Power (TEPCO), one of the largest electrical grids in Asia and the world, is founded in Japan.
- February 16 – The Ladies' Home Journal is published for the first time, in the United States.
- February 23 – Alabama becomes the first U.S. state to enact an antitrust law.
- February 28 – The first vaudeville theater is opened, in Boston, Massachusetts.
- February – The Adventures of Pinocchio by Carlo Collodi is first published complete in book form, in Italy.

=== March ===
- March 2 – The Hong Kong Observatory is established.
- March 9 – Demonstration of 9 March 1883 : Parisian anarchists, unemployed and carpenters narrowly miss the Presidential palace during a violent protest; first use of the black flag as a symbol of anarchism by Louise Michel.
- March 20 – The Paris Convention for the Protection of Industrial Property is held.
- March 28 – Battle of Gia Cuc: A French force defeats the Vietnamese in northern Vietnam in the run-up to the Sino-French War.

=== April ===
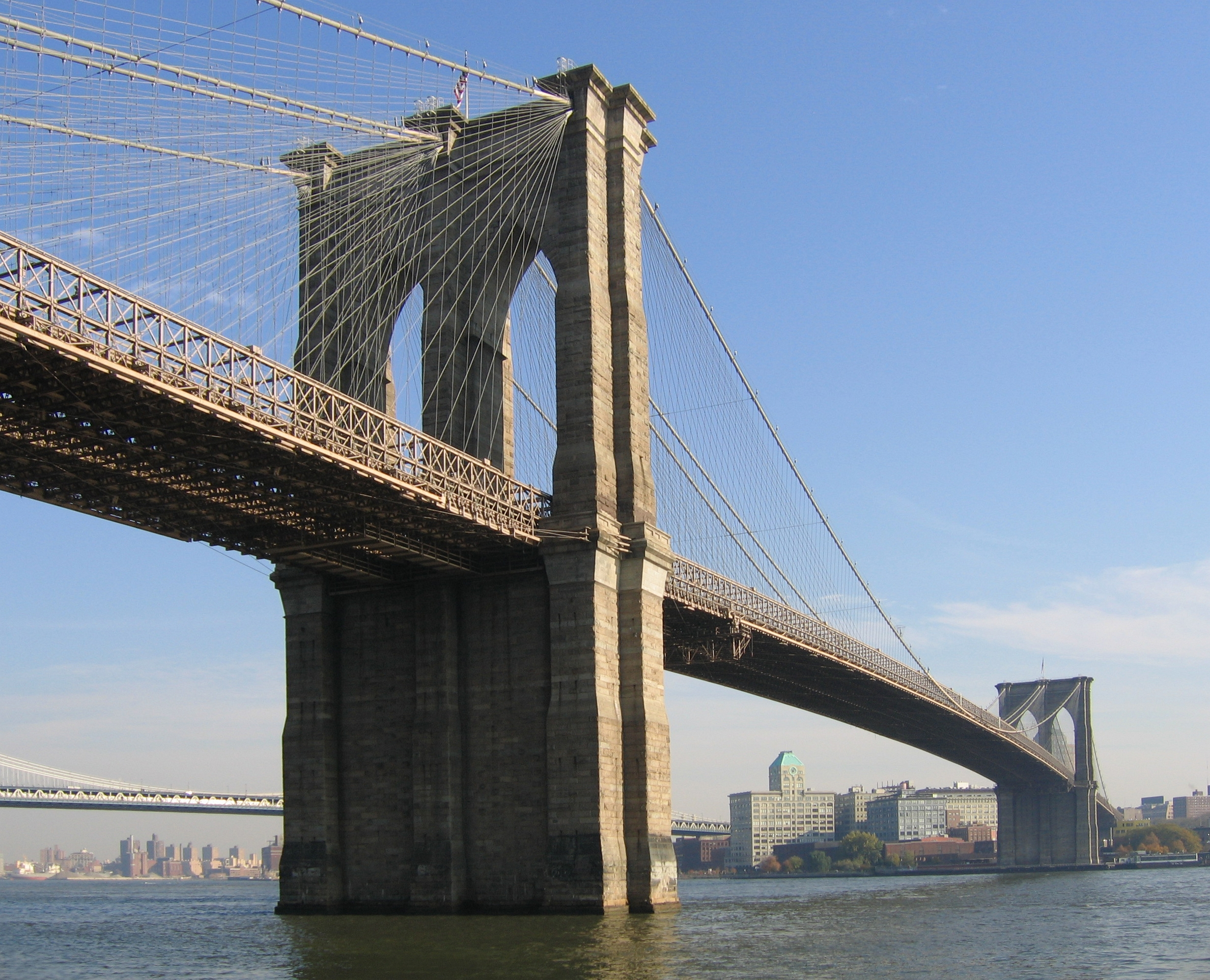
May 24: Brooklyn Bridge is opened.

- April 5 – Oxygen is liquefied for the first time.
- April 28 – The first rugby sevens tournament is played at Melrose RFC in Scotland.

=== May ===
- May 20 – 1883 eruption of Krakatoa, Indonesia
- May 23 – Robert Louis Stevenson's children's pirate adventure novel Treasure Island is first published in book format, in London.
- May 24 – Brooklyn Bridge is opened to traffic in New York City, after 13 years of construction.
- May 30 – A rumor that the Brooklyn Bridge is going to collapse causes a stampede, which crushes 12 people.
- May 31 – Otto von Bismarck pushes the first social security law through the Reichstag. It establishes a system of Publicly funded health care, one of the first worldwide. It is signed into law on June 15.

=== June ===
- June 13 – Count Arvid Posse leaves office as Prime Minister of Sweden. He is succeeded by Carl Johan Thyselius, the first non-aristocrat (Swedish; "ofrälse") to serve as Swedish head of government, and Prime Minister.
- June 16 – Victoria Hall disaster: A rush for treats results in 183 children being asphyxiated in a concert hall in Sunderland, England.
- June 28 – In Milan, Italy, the first central European electricity power station is inaugurated.
- June 30 – Robert Louis Stevenson's novel The Black Arrow first appears as a serial in the British magazine Young Folks; A Boys' and Girls' Paper of Instructive and Entertaining Literature as by 'Captain George North'. Stevenson completes writing it at the end of the summer in France.

=== July ===
- July 3 – The SS Daphne sinks on launch in Glasgow, Scotland, leaving 124 dead.
- July 4 – The world's first rodeo is held in Pecos, Texas.
- July 22 – Zulu King Cetshwayo barely escapes a rebel attack with his life.

=== August ===
- August 12 – The last quagga dies at the Artis Magistra zoo in Amsterdam.
- August 21 – 1883 Rochester tornado: An F5 tornado strikes Rochester, Minnesota, leading to the creation of the Mayo Clinic.
- August 26–27 – 1883 eruption of Krakatoa: The volcanic island of Krakatoa erupts at 10:02 am (local time); 163 villages are destroyed, 36,417 killed by tsunami.
- August 29 – Dunfermline Carnegie Library, the first Carnegie library, is opened in Andrew Carnegie's hometown, Dunfermline, Scotland.
- August – King William's College is opened on the Isle of Man.

=== September ===
- September 1 – Pope Leo XIII publishes the encyclical Supremi apostolatus officio ("On Devotion of the Rosary").
- September 11 – Major Evelyn Baring becomes Consul-General of Egypt under British rule.
- September 15
  - The Bombay Natural History Society is founded in India.
  - The University of Texas at Austin opens to students.
- September 29 – A consortium of flour mill operators in Minneapolis forms the Minneapolis, Sault Ste. Marie and Atlantic Railway, as a means to get their product to the Great Lakes ports, avoiding the high tariffs of Chicago.

=== October ===
- October 1
  - Sydney Boys High School is founded in Sydney, Australia, the country's first state high school.
  - In Amsterdam, the first International Colonial and Export Exhibition closes, having had over 1 million visitors.
- October 4
  - The Boys' Brigade (the first uniformed youth organization in existence) is founded in Glasgow, Scotland.
  - The Orient Express train begins to run through from Paris Gare de l'Est to Giurgiu in Romania, with onward ferry and train connections to Istanbul (the train has been running since June 5 as far as Vienna).
- October 16 – In five Civil Rights Cases the Supreme Court of the United States declares part of the Civil Rights Act of 1875 to be unconstitutional, allowing individuals and corporations to discriminate based on race.
- October 20 – Peru and Chile sign the Treaty of Ancón, by which the Tarapacá province is ceded to Chile, ending Peru's involvement in the War of the Pacific.
- October 22 – The Mödling and Hinterbrühl Tram in Vienna (Austria) is the first electric tram powered by overhead wire.
- October 24 – Cardiff University, Wales, opens (under the name of University College of South Wales and Monmouthshire).
- October 30 – Two Clan na Gael dynamite bombs explode in the London Underground, injuring several people. The next day, British Home Secretary Vernon Harcourt drafts 300 policemen to guard the underground, and introduces the Explosives Bill.

=== November ===
- November 3
  - The 14th Century AH begins in the Islamic calendar on the 1st of Muharram, 1301 AH.
  - American Old West: Self-described Black Bart the Po-8 makes his last stagecoach robbery, but leaves a handkerchief with a laundry mark that eventually leads to his capture.
- November 14 – Chile's National Library of Congress is founded.
- November 18 – U.S. and Canadian railroads institute 5 standard continental time zones, ending the confusion of thousands of local times.
- November 28 – Whitman College is chartered as a 4-year college in Walla Walla, Washington.

=== December ===
- December 1 – Battleford Industrial School, the first government-operated Indian residential school opens in Canada.
- December 5 – Bisbee Massacre: Five people are killed in the robbery of a general store by bandits in Bisbee, Arizona.
- December 16 – Tonkin Campaign: French forces capture the Sơn Tây citadel.
- December 21 – The Royal Canadian Dragoons and The Royal Canadian Regiment, the first Permanent Force cavalry and infantry regiments of the Canadian Army, are formed.
- December 26 – The Harbour Grace Affray takes place in Harbour Grace, Colony of Newfoundland.

=== Date unknown ===
- Antoni Gaudí begins to work on the Sagrada Família Cathedral in Barcelona (it was consecrated in 2010)
- Construction of Speicherstadt as a free zone in the Port of Hamburg begins.
- During construction of the Canadian Pacific Railway in 1883, blasting and excavation reveal high concentrations of nickel–copper ore at Murray Mine, on the edge of the Sudbury Basin, located near Sudbury, Ontario, Canada.
- The British Parliament considers a major bill to allow Indian judges to try Europeans in India. The British community rises in protest, and defeats the measure.
- The Mexican government passes a law allowing real estate companies (controlled by General Porfirio Díaz's political associates) to survey public and "vacant" lands, and to retain one third of the land they survey.
- Bernard Kroger establishes the first Kroger grocery store, in Cincinnati, Ohio.
- The first purebred Percheron (horse) stud book is created in France.
- ASEA is founded by Ludvig Fredholm in Sweden, predecessor of the global electronic equipment and engineering business ABB.
- Founding of:
  - Houghton College in New York State
  - Wagner College in New York City
  - Baltimore Polytechnic Institute in Maryland
  - Raith Rovers F.C. in Scotland
  - The Black Arabs F.C (later Bristol Rovers) in England
  - Dunstable Town F.C. in England

== Births ==
=== January–February ===
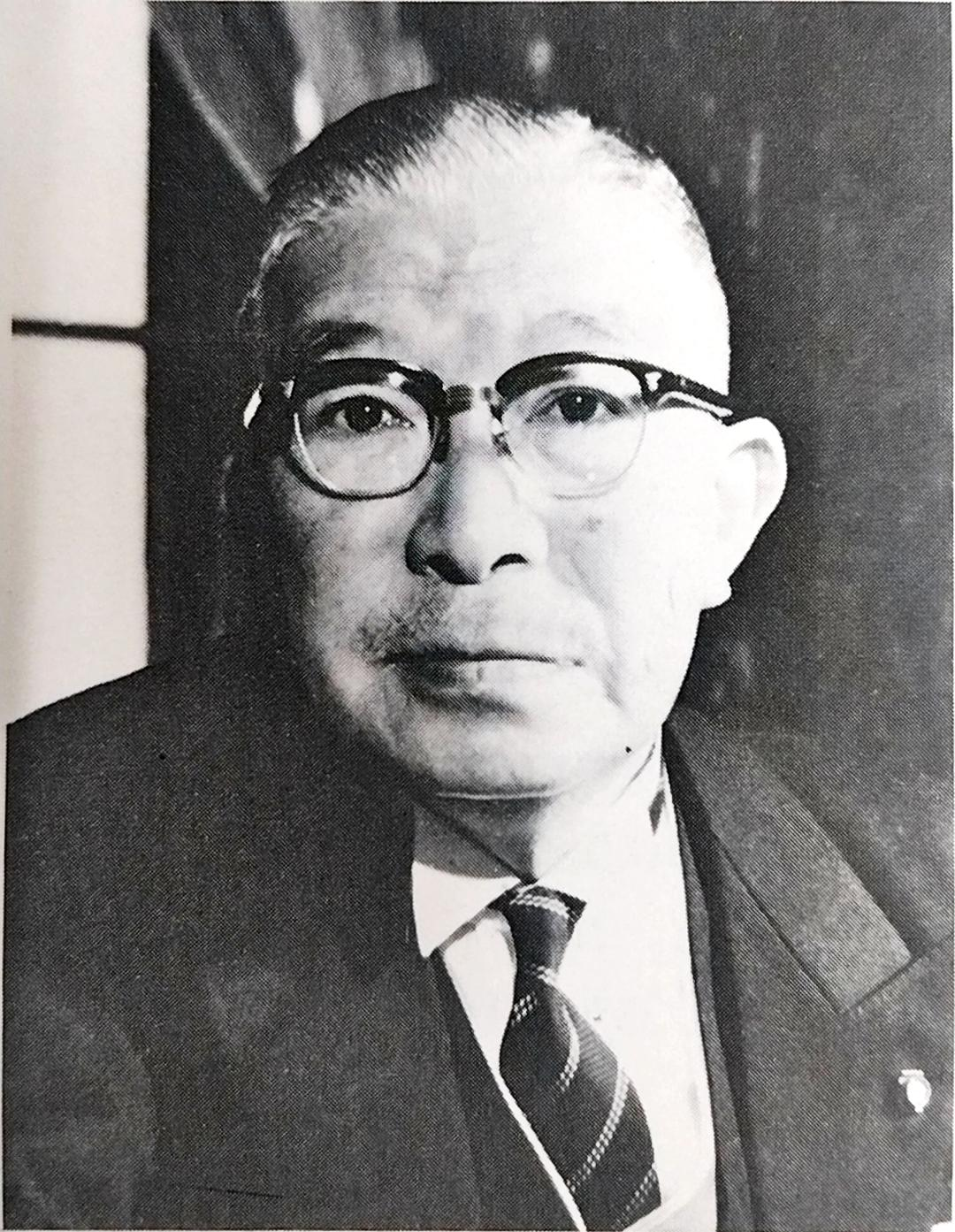
Ichirō Hatoyama

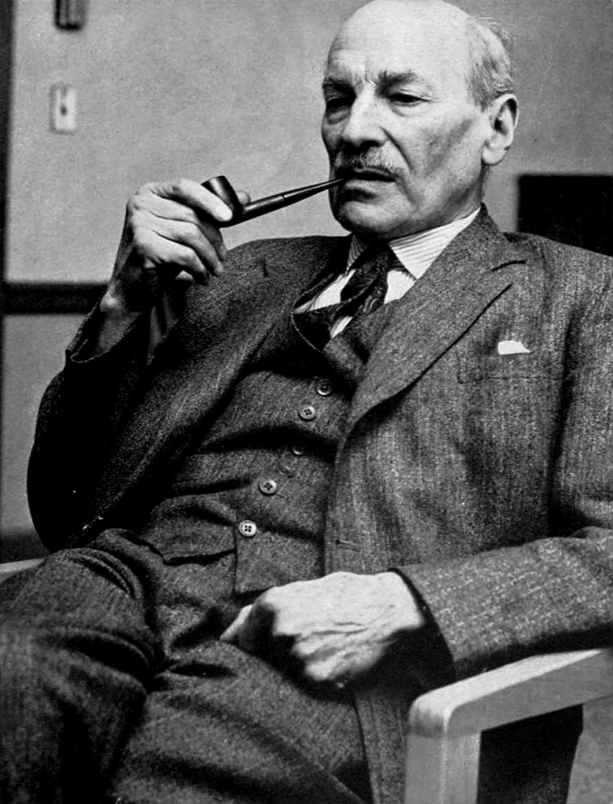
Clement Attlee

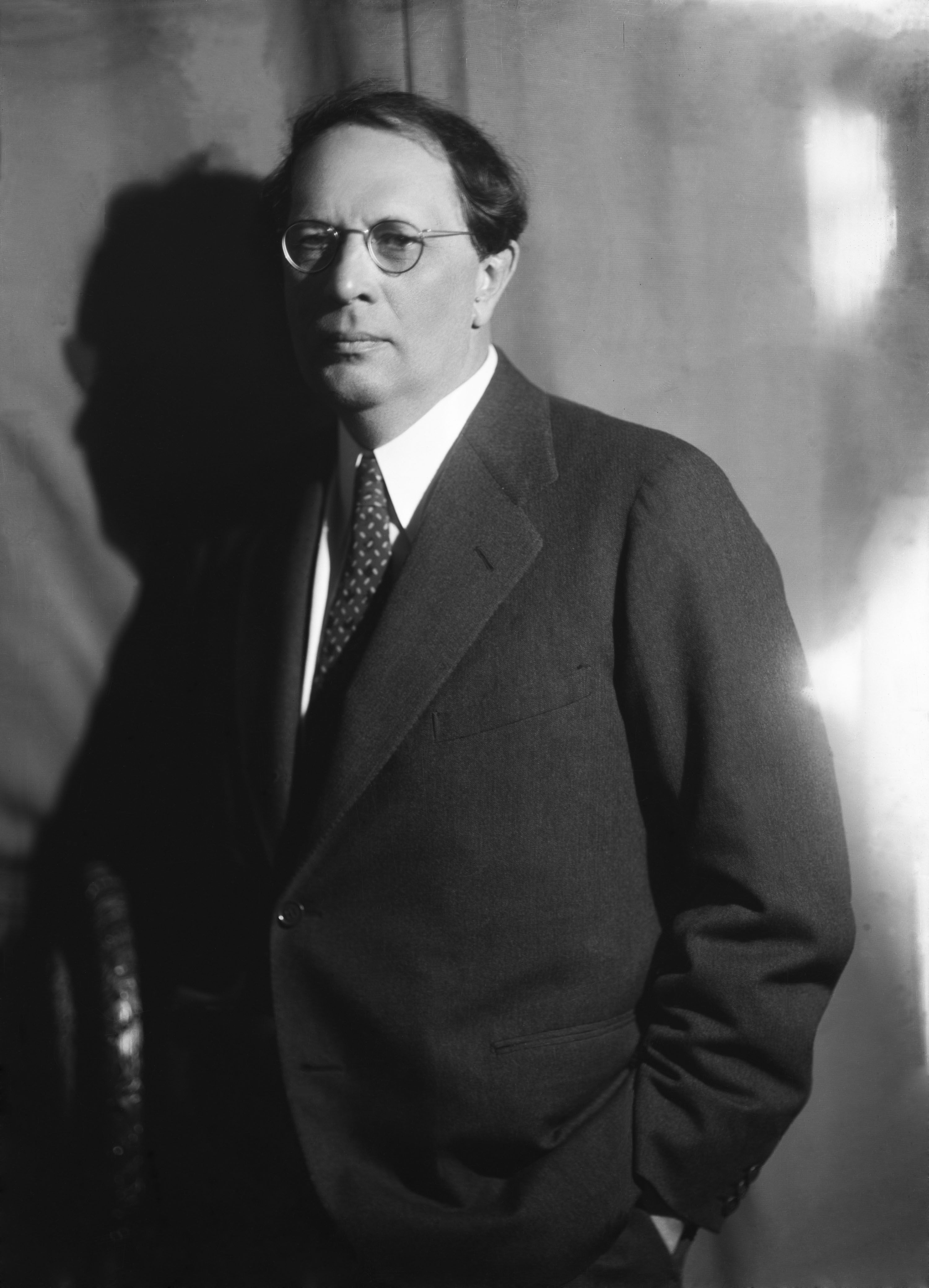
Aleksei Nikolaevich Tolstoy

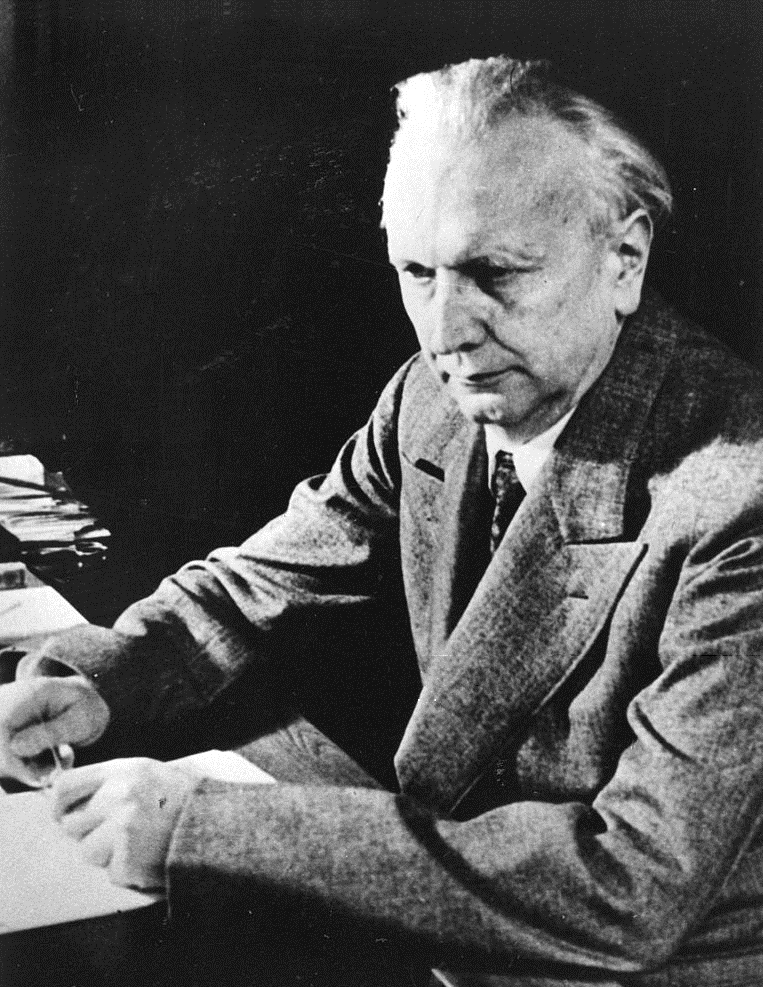
Karl Jaspers

- January 1 – Ichirō Hatoyama, Prime Minister of Japan (d. 1959)
- January 3 – Clement Attlee, Prime Minister of the United Kingdom (d. 1967)
- January 4 – Johanna Westerdijk, Dutch plant pathologist (d. 1961)
- January 5 – Döme Sztójay, Prime Minister of Hungary (d. 1946)
- January 6 – Kahlil Gibran, Lebanese poet, painter and novelist (d. 1931)
- January 10
  - Francis X. Bushman, American screen actor (d. 1966)
  - Hubert Latham, pioneer French aviator of the pre-World War I era (d. 1912)
  - Florence Reed, American actress (d. 1967)
  - Helen Lackaye, American stage actress (d. 1940)
  - Aleksei Nikolaevich Tolstoy, Russian writer (d. 1945)
- January 16 – Oswald Short, English aircraft manufacturer (d. 1969)
- January 19 – Waite Phillips, American businessman, philanthropist (d. 1964)
- January 20 – Bertram Ramsay, British admiral (d. 1945)
- February 8 – Joseph Schumpeter, Austrian economist (d. 1950)
- February 15 – Sax Rohmer, English author (d. 1959)
- February 16 – Koshirō Oikawa, Japanese admiral (d. 1958)
- February 22
  - Abe Attell, American boxer (d. 1970)
  - Marguerite Clark, American silent film actress (d. 1940)
- February 23 – Karl Jaspers, German philosopher (d. 1969)
- February 28 – Gheorghe Argeșanu, Romanian general and politician, 40th Prime Minister of Romania (d. 1940)

=== March–April ===
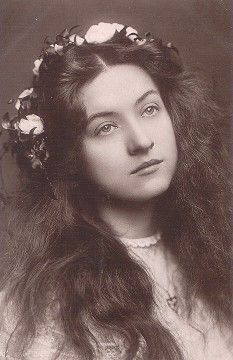
Maude Fealy

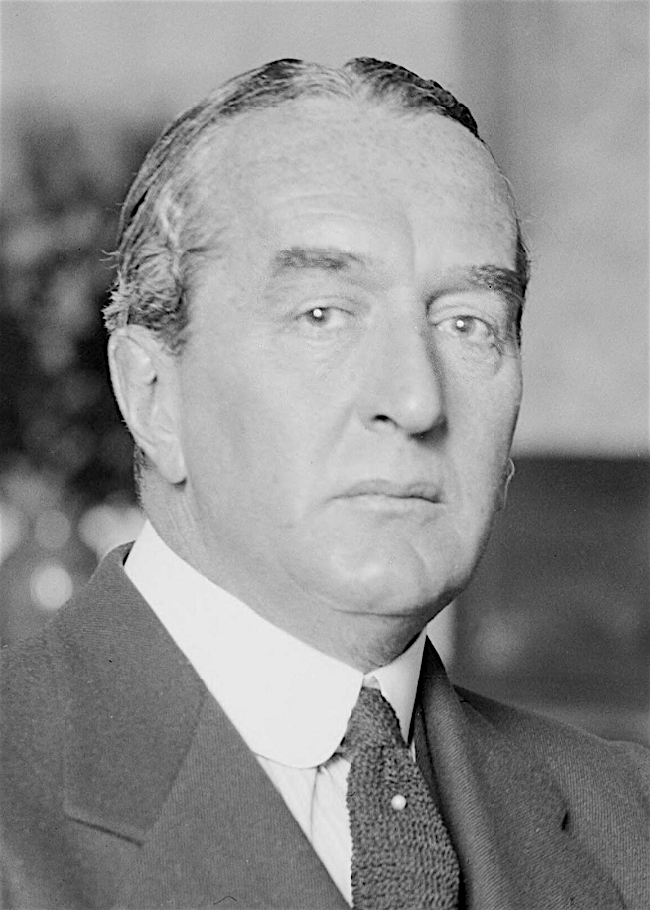
Stanley Bruce

- March 2 – Nikos Kazantzakis, Greek writer (d. 1957)
- March 3 – Cyril Burt, British educational psychologist (d. 1971)
- March 4
  - Sam Langford, Canadian boxer (d. 1956)
  - Maude Fealy, American actress (d. 1971)
- March 7 – Michael Somogyi, Hungarian-American biochemist (d. 1971)
- March 19
  - Norman Haworth, British chemist, Nobel Prize laureate (d. 1950)
  - Joseph Stilwell, American general (d. 1946)
- March 21 – Sam Hardy, American stage and screen actor (d. 1935)
- March 24 – Dorothy Campbell, Scottish golfer (d. 1945)
- March 28 – Tikiri Bandara Panabokke II, Ceylonese colonial-era legislator, lawyer and diplomat (d. 1963)
- April 1
  - Laurette Taylor, American actress (d. 1946)
  - Lon Chaney, American actor (d. 1930)
- April 3 – Henry Diesen, Norwegian admiral (d. 1953)
- April 5 – Walter Huston, Canadian-born American actor (d. 1950)
- April 11 – Leonard Mudie, English actor (d. 1965)
- April 12 – Dally Messenger, Australian rugby league player (d. 1959)
- April 15 – Stanley Bruce, 8th Prime Minister of Australia (d. 1967)
- April 25 – Semyon Budyonny, Cossack cavalryman, Marshal of the Soviet Union (d. 1973)
- April 30 – Jaroslav Hašek, Czech writer (d. 1923)

=== May–June ===
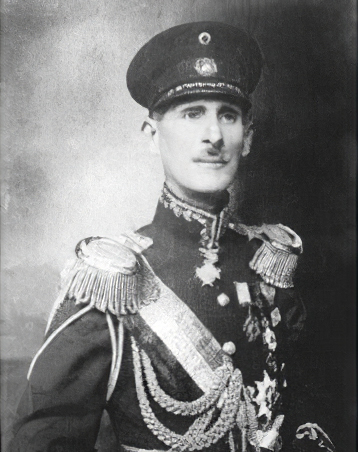
Eleazar López Contreras

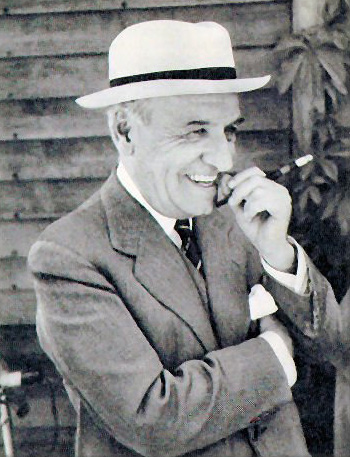
José Ortega y Gasset

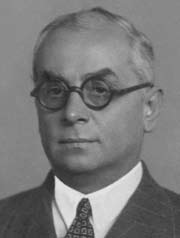
Celâl Bayar

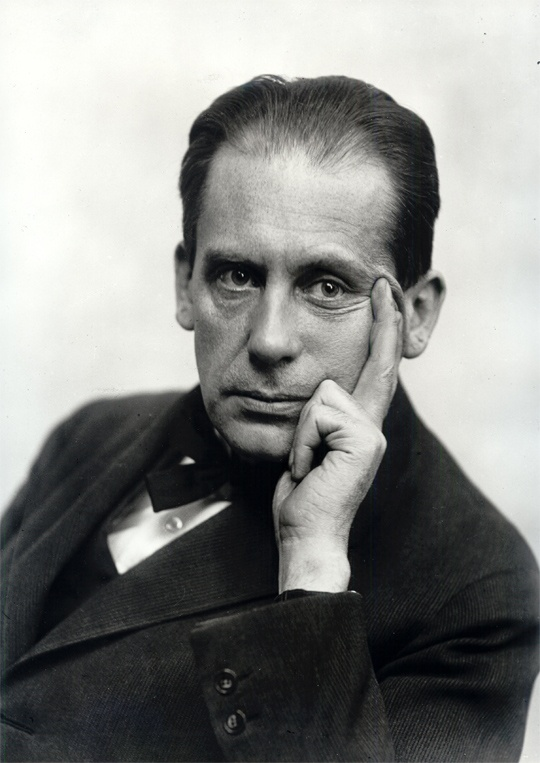
Walter Gropius

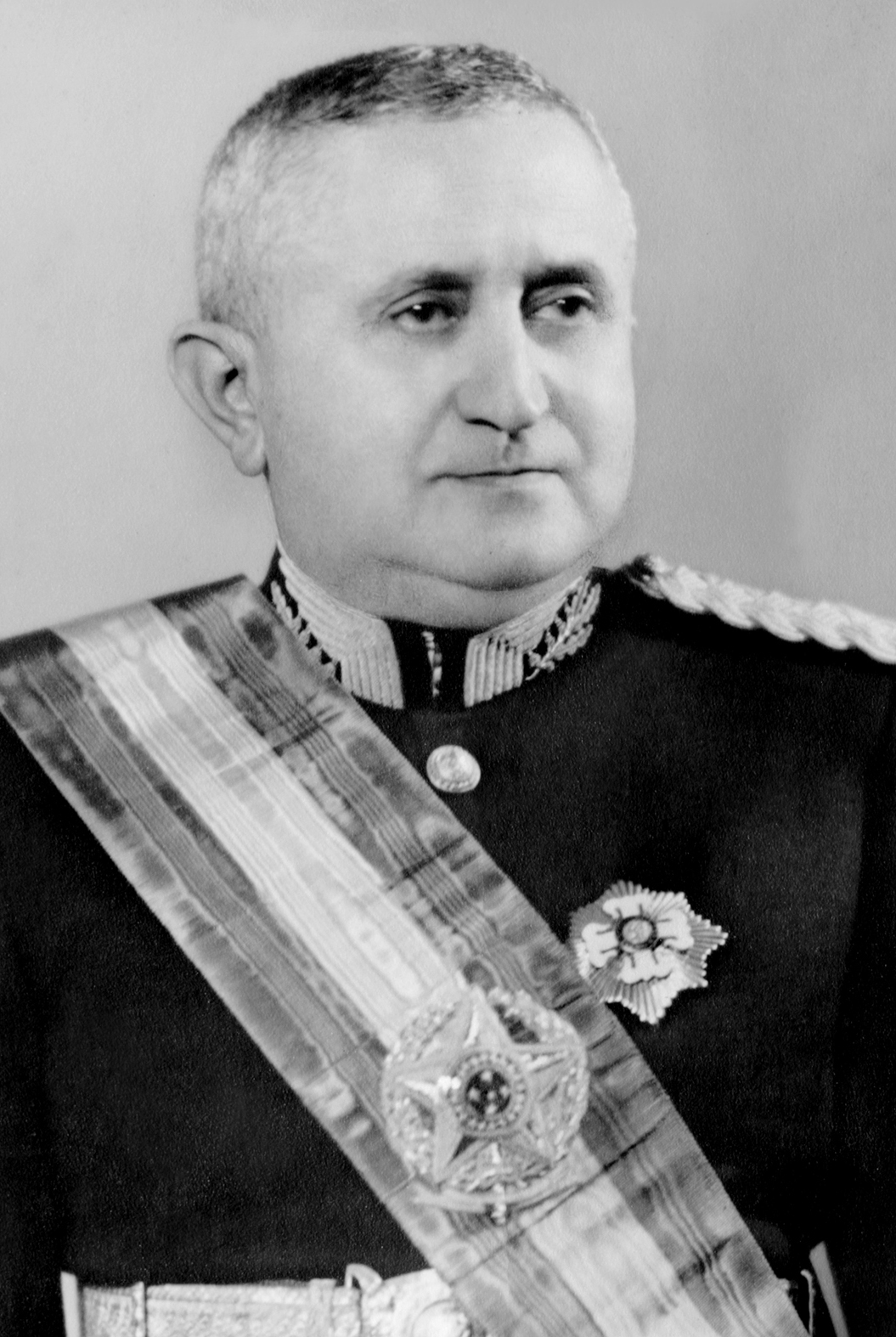
Eurico Gaspar Dutra

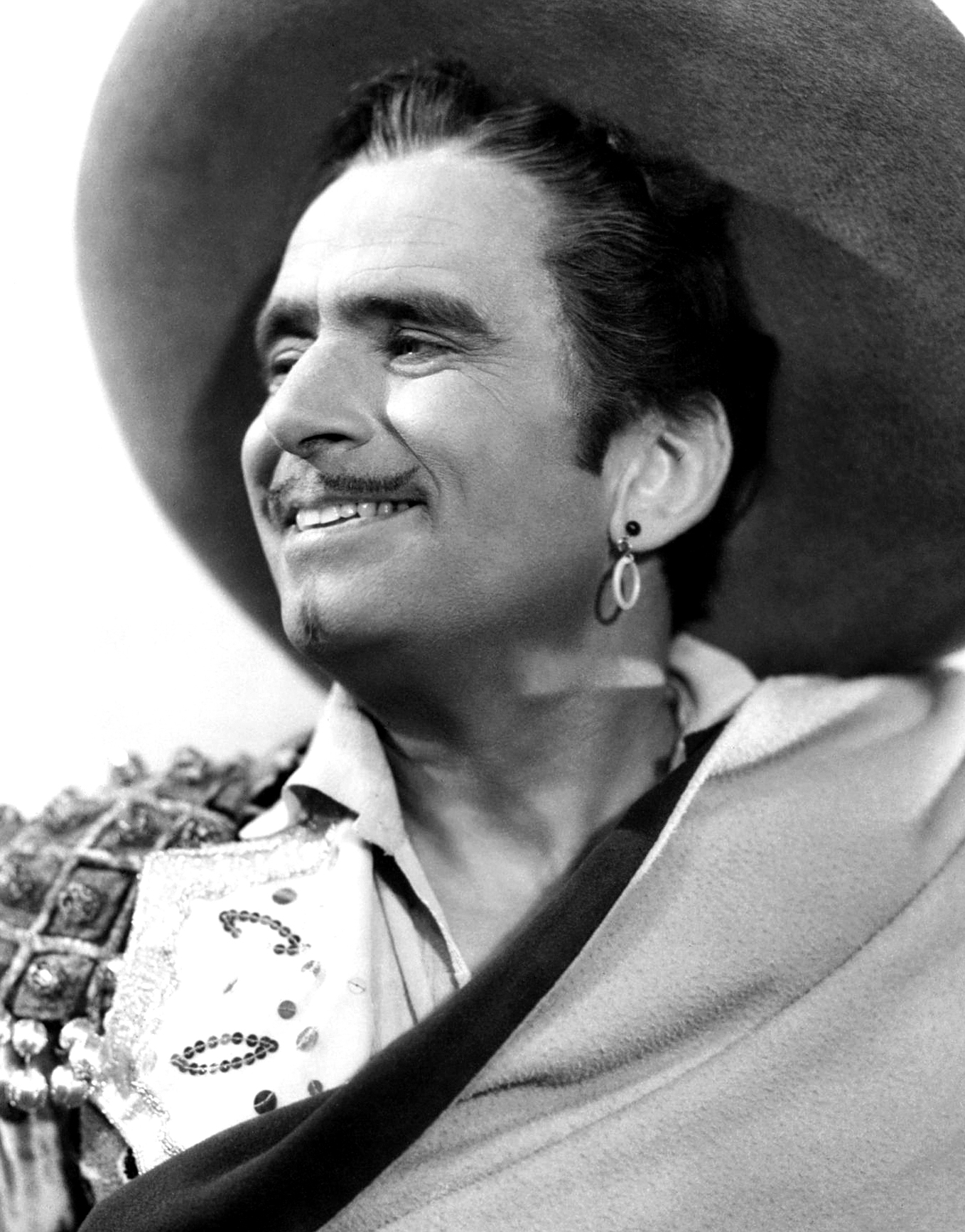
Douglas Fairbanks

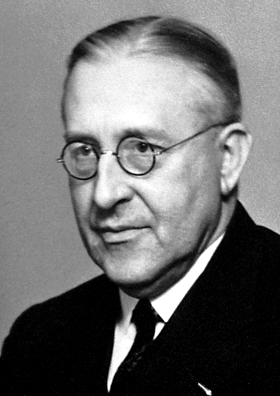
Victor Franz Hess

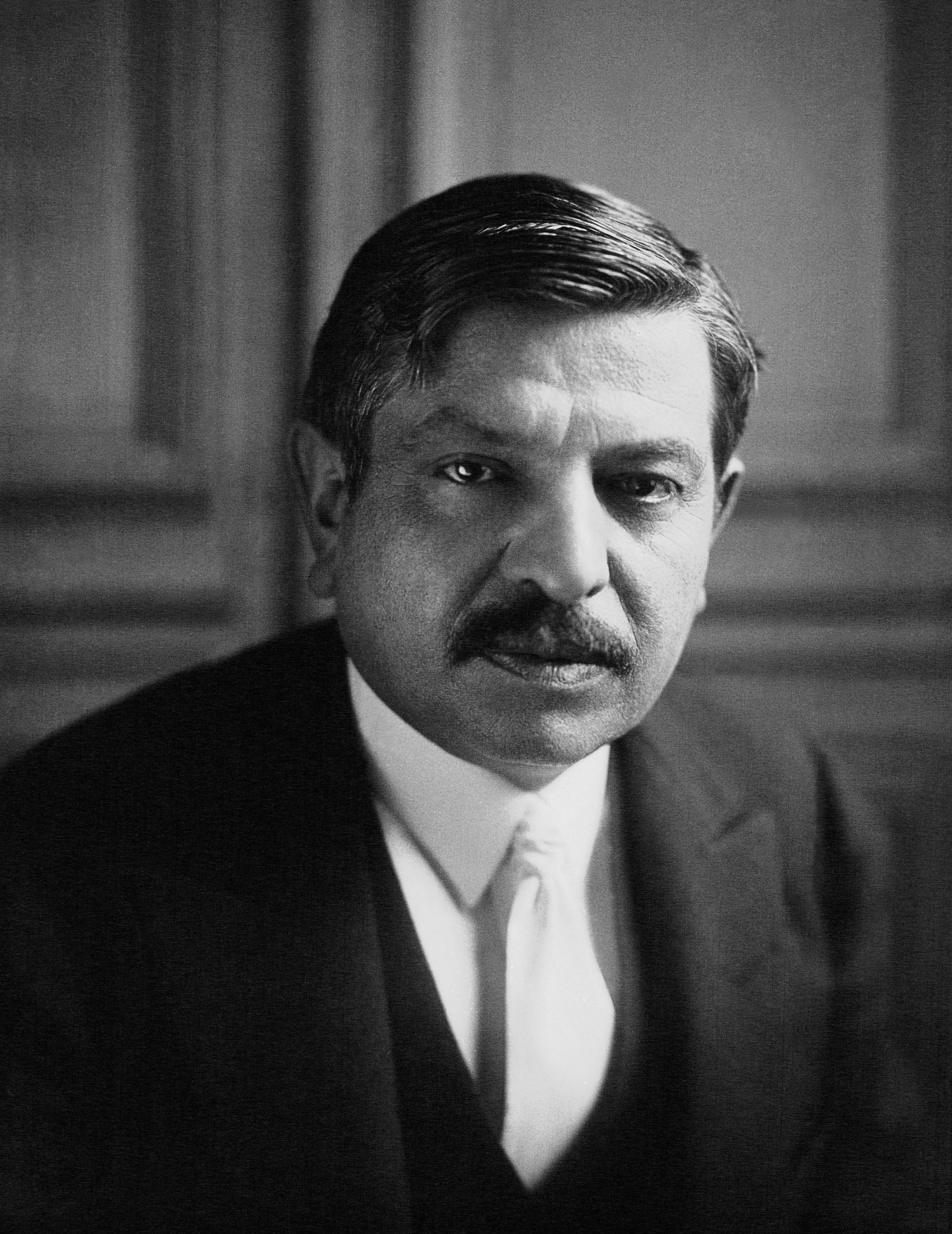
Pierre Laval

- May 1 – Tom Moore, Irish-American actor (d. 1955)
- May 5
  - Eleazar López Contreras, 32nd President of Venezuela (d. 1973)
  - Archibald Wavell, 1st Earl Wavell, British field marshal (d. 1950)
- May 9 – José Ortega y Gasset, Spanish philosopher (d. 1955)
- May 10 – Eugen Leviné, Communist leader of the Munich Soviet Republic (d. 1919)
- May 16
  - Celâl Bayar, Turkish politician, statesman, 3rd President of Turkey (d. 1986)
  - Solomone Ula Ata, Prime Minister of Tonga (d. 1950)
- May 18
  - Walter Gropius, German architect (d. 1969)
  - Hasui Kawase, Japanese painter, printmaker (d. 1957)
  - Eurico Gaspar Dutra, Brazilian marshal, 16th President of Brazil (d. 1974)
- May 23 – Douglas Fairbanks, American actor (d. 1939)
- May 24 – Elsa Maxwell, American gossip columnist, international party giver (d. 1963)
- May 25 – Lesley J. McNair, American general (d. 1944)
- May 27 – Jessie Arms Botke, American artist (d. 1971)
- May 28 – Vinayak Damodar Savarkar, Indian pro-independence activist, Hindu nationalist (d. 1966)
- May 31 – Lauri Kristian Relander, President of Finland (d. 1942)
- June 5
  - John Maynard Keynes, English economist (d. 1946)
  - Mary Helen Young, Scottish nurse and resistance fighter during World War II (died 1945)
- June 7 – Sylvanus Morley, American scholar, World War I spy (d. 1948)
- June 11 – Aubrey Fitch, American admiral (d. 1978)
- June 18 – Mary Alden, American stage, screen actress (d. 1946)
- June 20 – Royal E. Ingersoll, American admiral (d. 1976)
- June 24 – Victor Francis Hess, Austrian-born American physicist, Nobel Prize laureate (d. 1964)
- June 28 – Pierre Laval, Prime Minister of France (d. 1945)
- June 29 – Lothrop Stoddard, American eugenicist, radical scientific racist (d. 1950)

=== July–August ===
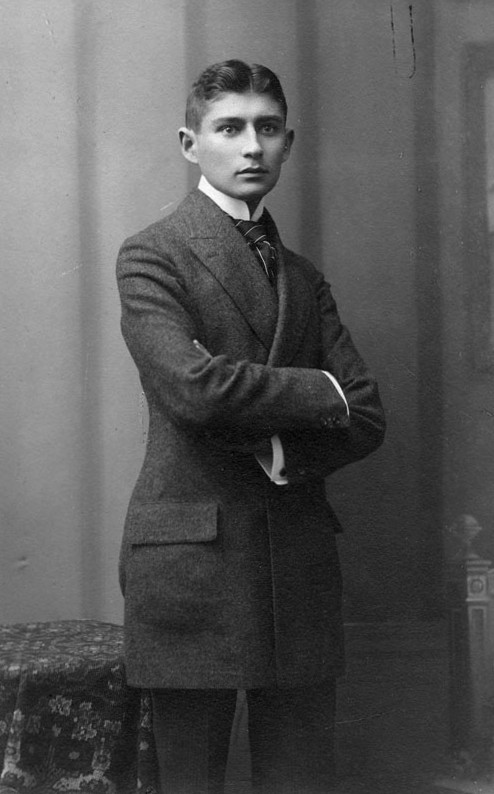
Franz Kafka

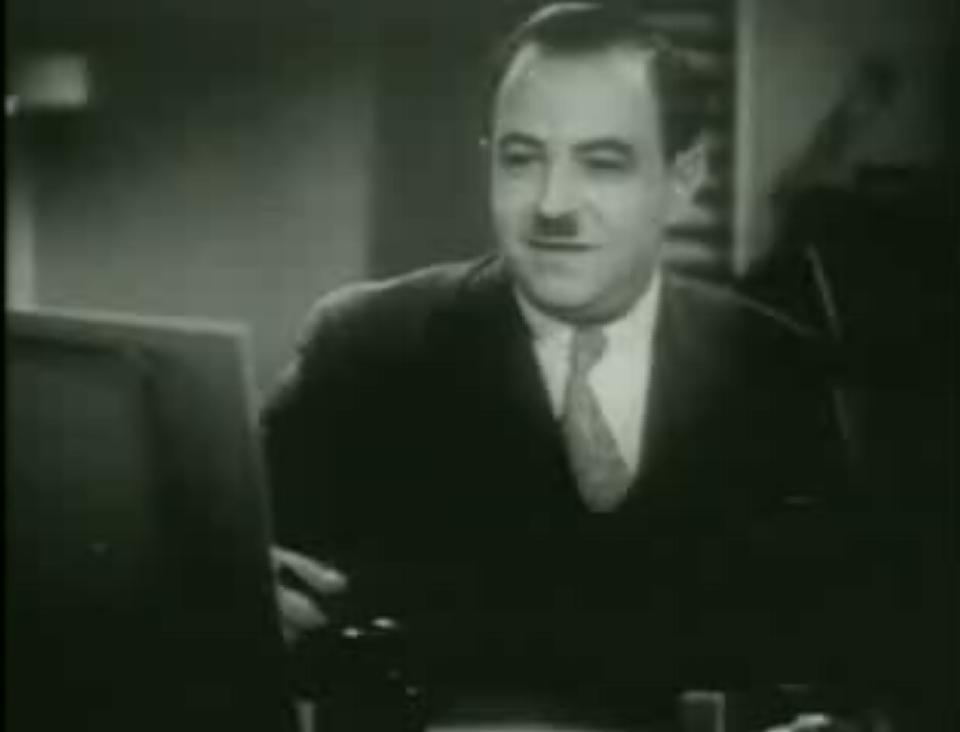
Max Fleischer

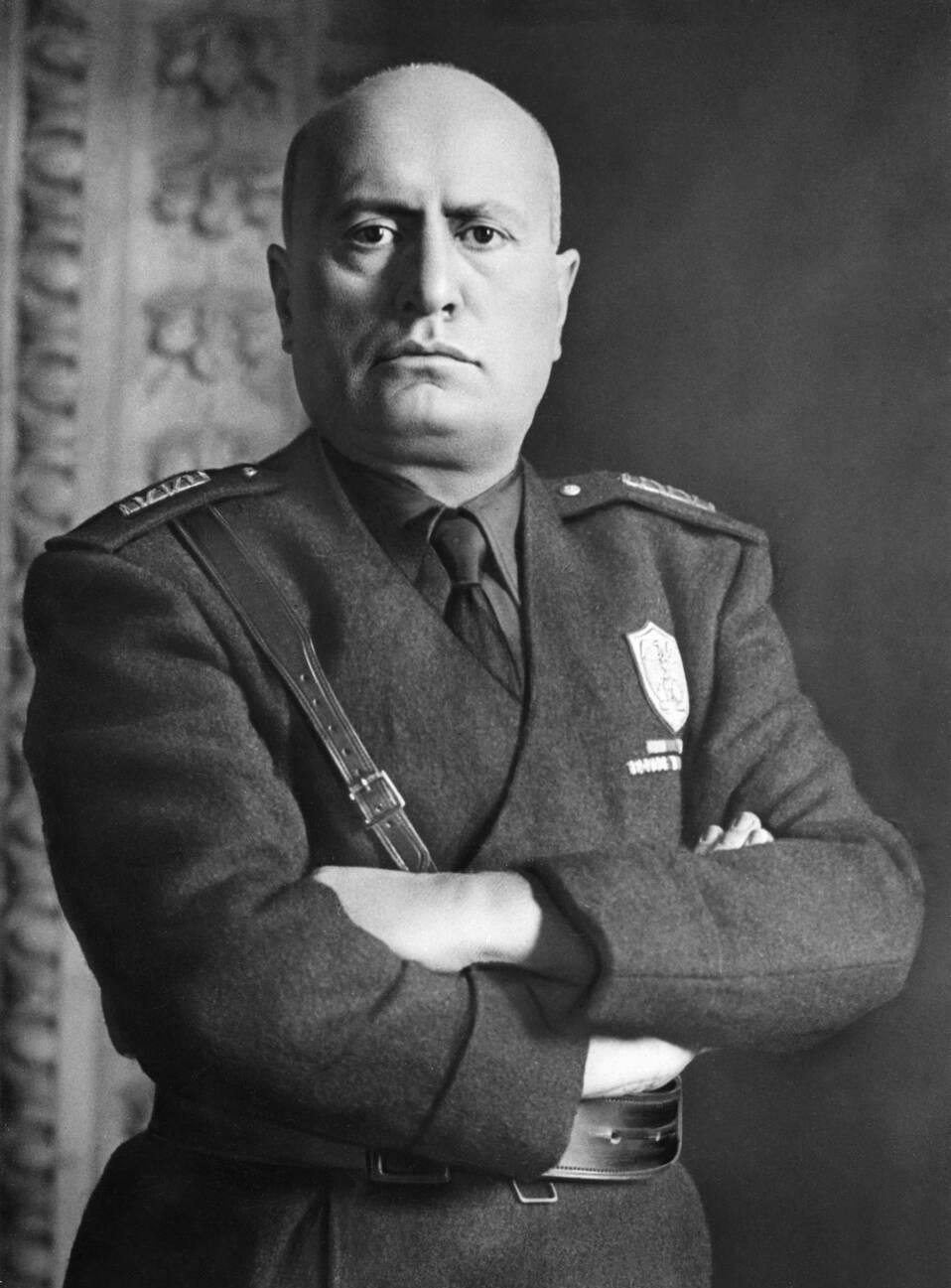
Benito Mussolini

Coco Chanel

- July 1 – István Friedrich, 24th Prime Minister of Hungary (d. 1951)
- July 3 – Franz Kafka, Austrian writer (d. 1924)
- July 4 – Rube Goldberg, American cartoonist (d. 1970)
- July 6 – Godfrey Huggins, English-born Rhodesian politician and physician, Prime Minister of Rhodesia (d. 1971)
- July 10 – Johannes Blaskowitz, German general (d. 1948)
- July 13 – Jack Reagan, American salesman (d. 1941)
- July 16 – Charles Sheeler, American photographer, artist (d. 1965)
- July 19
  - Max Fleischer, Austrian animator, film producer (Betty Boop) (d. 1972)
  - Beatrice Forbes, Countess of Granard, American-born heiress (d. 1972)
- July 20 – Catherine Bramwell-Booth, English Salvation Army officer (d. 1987)
- July 23
  - Alan Brooke, 1st Viscount Alanbrooke, British field marshal (d. 1963)
  - Ubaldo Soddu, Italian general (d. 1949)
  - Oscar Westover, United States Army Air Corps general (d. 1938)
- July 25 – Alfredo Casella, Italian composer (d. 1947)
- July 26 – Edwin Balmer, American science fiction, mystery writer (d. 1959)
- July 29
  - Henry Robertson Bowers, Scottish polar explorer (d. 1912)
  - Benito Mussolini, dictator of Italy (d. 1945)
- July 31 – Ramón Fonst, Cuban fencer (d. 1959)
- August 2 – Aurelio Mosquera, Ecuadorian politician, 25th President of Ecuador (d. 1939)
- August 6 – Scott Nearing, American political activist, economist, and simple living advocate (d. 1983)
- August 9 – Chester Gillette, American murderer (d. 1908)
- August 12
  - Pauline Frederick, American stage, screen actress (d. 1938)
  - Marion Lorne, American film, stage and television actress (d. 1968)
- August 15 – Ivan Meštrović, Croatian sculptor and architect (d. 1962)
- August 19
  - Coco Chanel, French fashion designer (d. 1971)
  - Elsie Ferguson, American actress (d. 1961)
  - José Mendes Cabeçadas, 9th President of Portugal and 94th Prime Minister of Portugal (d. 1965)
  - Axel Pehrsson-Bramstorp, 24th Prime Minister of Sweden (d. 1954)
- August 23
  - Jesse Pennington, English footballer (d. 1970)
  - Jonathan M. Wainwright, American general (d. 1953)
- August 30 – Theo van Doesburg, Dutch artist, painter, architect, and poet (d. 1931)

=== September–October ===
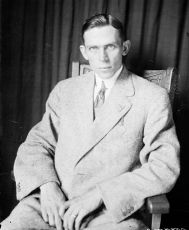
Mel Sheppard

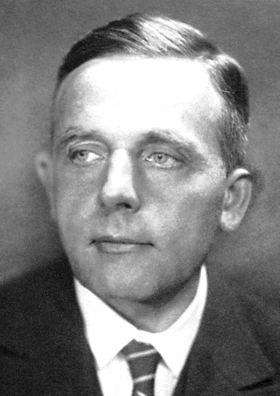
Otto Heinrich Warburg

- September 2 – Rudolf Weigl, Polish biologist (d. 1957)
- September 5 – Mel Sheppard, American Olympic athlete (d. 1942)
- September 13 – August Zaleski, 6th President of Poland (d. 1972)
- September 15 – Esteban Terradas i Illa, Catalan mathematician, scientist, and engineer (d. 1950)
- September 24 - Franklin Clarence Mars, American business magnate, founder of Mars Inc. (d. 1934)
- September 28 – Berta Pīpiņa, Latvian politician (d. 1942)
- October 2 – Karl von Terzaghi, Austrian civil engineer and "father of soil mechanics" (d. 1963)
- October 5 – Joseph Hubert Priestley, British botanist (d. 1944)
- October 8 – Otto Heinrich Warburg, German physician and physiologist, Nobel Prize laureate (d. 1970)
- October 15 – Robert L. Ghormley, American admiral (d. 1958)
- October 26 – Paul Pilgrim, American athlete (d. 1958)
- October 30 – Bob Jones Sr., American evangelist, religious broadcaster, and founder of Bob Jones University (d. 1968)
- October 31 – Anthony Wilding, New Zealand tennis player (d. 1915)

=== November–December ===
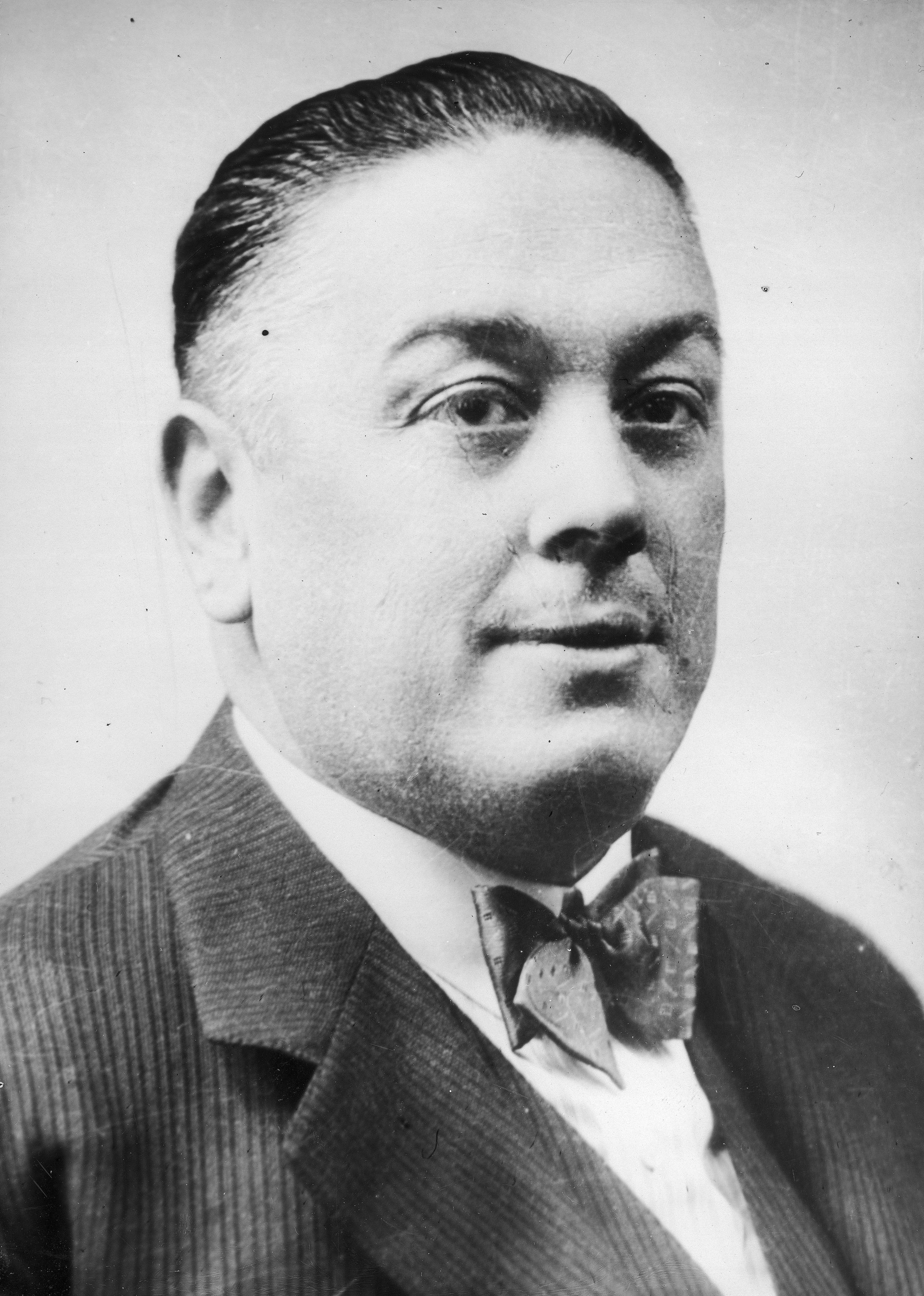
Diego Martínez Barrio

- November 4 – Nikolaos Plastiras, Greek general and politician (d. 1953)
- November 7 – Francisco Moreno Fernández, Spanish admiral (d. 1945)
- November 8 – Arnold Bax, English composer (d. 1953)
- November 9 – Edna May Oliver, American stage and film character actress (d. 1942)
- November 11 – Ernest Ansermet, Swiss conductor (d. 1969)
- November 14 – Ado Birk, 3rd Prime Minister of Estonia (d. 1942)
- November 18
  - Carl Vinson, U.S. congressman (d. 1981)
  - Alf Bjørnskau Bastiansen, Norwegian priest and politician (d. 1965)
- November 25
  - Harvey Spencer Lewis, American occultist (b. 1939)
  - Diego Martínez Barrio, Spanish politician, 2-time Prime Minister of Spain (d. 1962)
- November 26 – Belle da Costa Greene, American librarian, bibliographer, and archivist (d. 1950)
- November 29
  - Lev Galler, Soviet admiral (d. 1950)
  - Max Horton, British admiral (d. 1951)
- December 3 – Anton Webern, Austrian composer (d. 1945)
- December 9
  - Alexander Papagos, Prime Minister of Greece (d. 1955)
  - Joseph Pilates, German physical culturist and developer of Pilates (d. 1967)
- December 10 – Giovanni Messe, Italian field marshal and politician (d. 1968)
- December 12 – Maxey Dell Moody, American businessman and founder of M. D. Moody & Sons, Inc. (d. 1949)
- December 14 – Morihei Ueshiba, Japanese martial artist and founder of aikido (d. 1969)
- December 16 – Max Linder, French actor (d. 1925)
- December 22 – Edgard Varèse, French composer (d. 1965)
- December 25 – Hugo Bergmann, German and Israeli Jewish philosopher (d. 1975)
- December 26 – Maurice Utrillo, French artist and illustrator (d. 1955)
- December 28 – Lloyd Fredendall, American general (d. 1963)
- December 29 – Forrest Taylor, American stage, film and television actor (d. 1965)

=== Date unknown ===
- Lotte Herrlich, German photographer (d. 1956)
- Constantin Noe, Megleno-Romanian editor and professor (d. 1939)
- Ali Ahmad Khan, Afghan politician and emir (d. 1929)
- Ernest Spybuck, Native American artist (d. 1949)
- Trần Trọng Kim, Vietnamese historian and Prime Minister of the Empire of Vietnam (d. 1953)

== Deaths ==
=== January–June ===
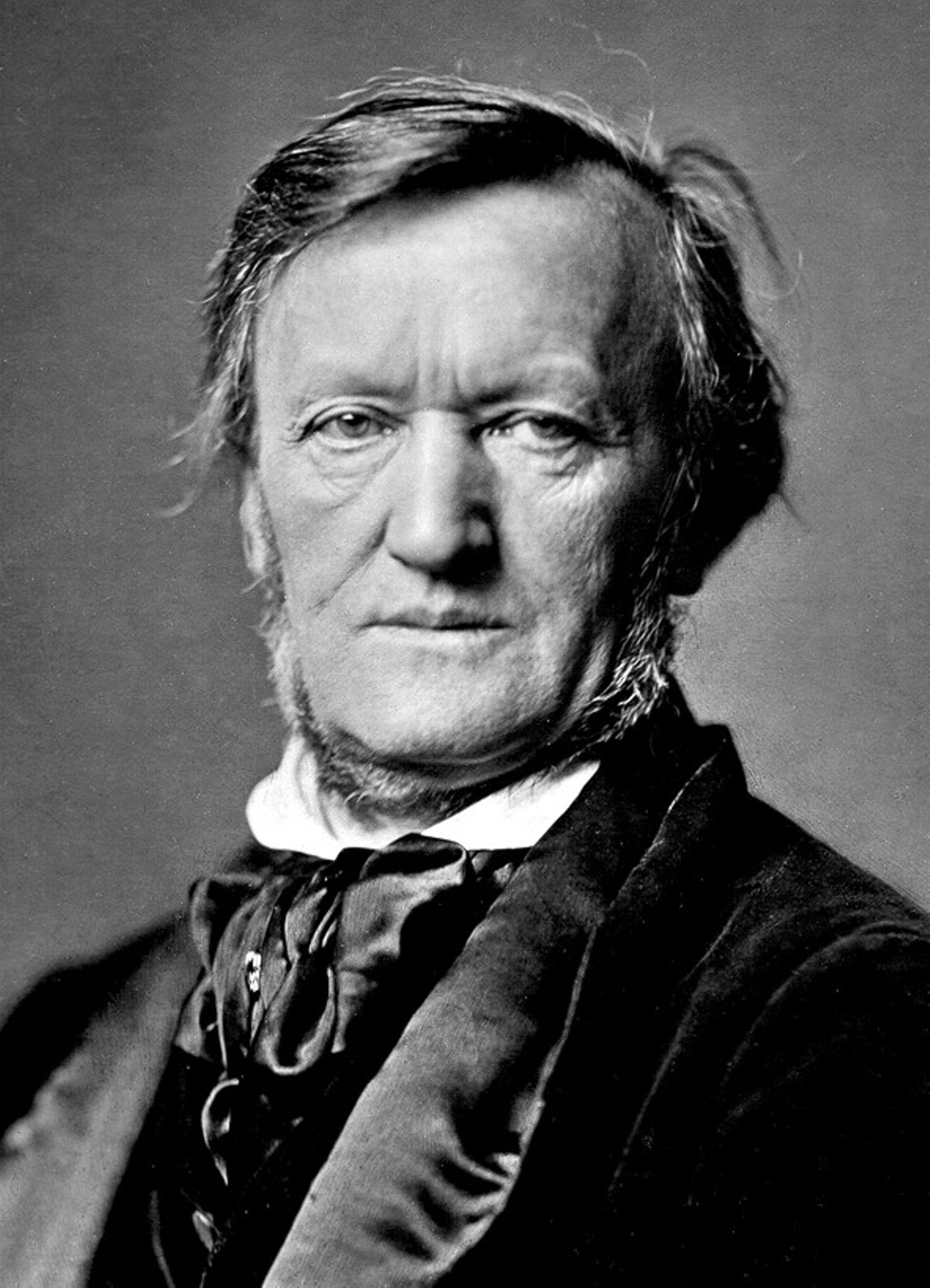
Richard Wagner

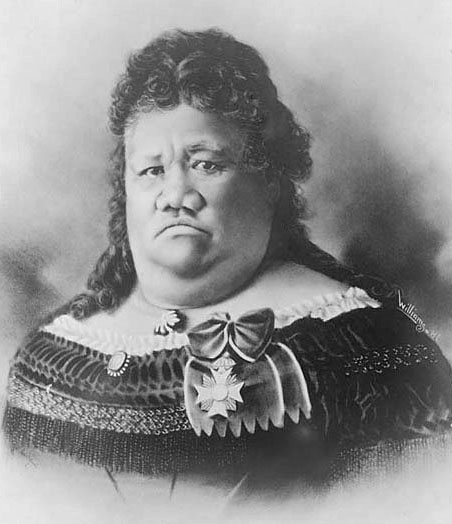
Keʻelikōlani

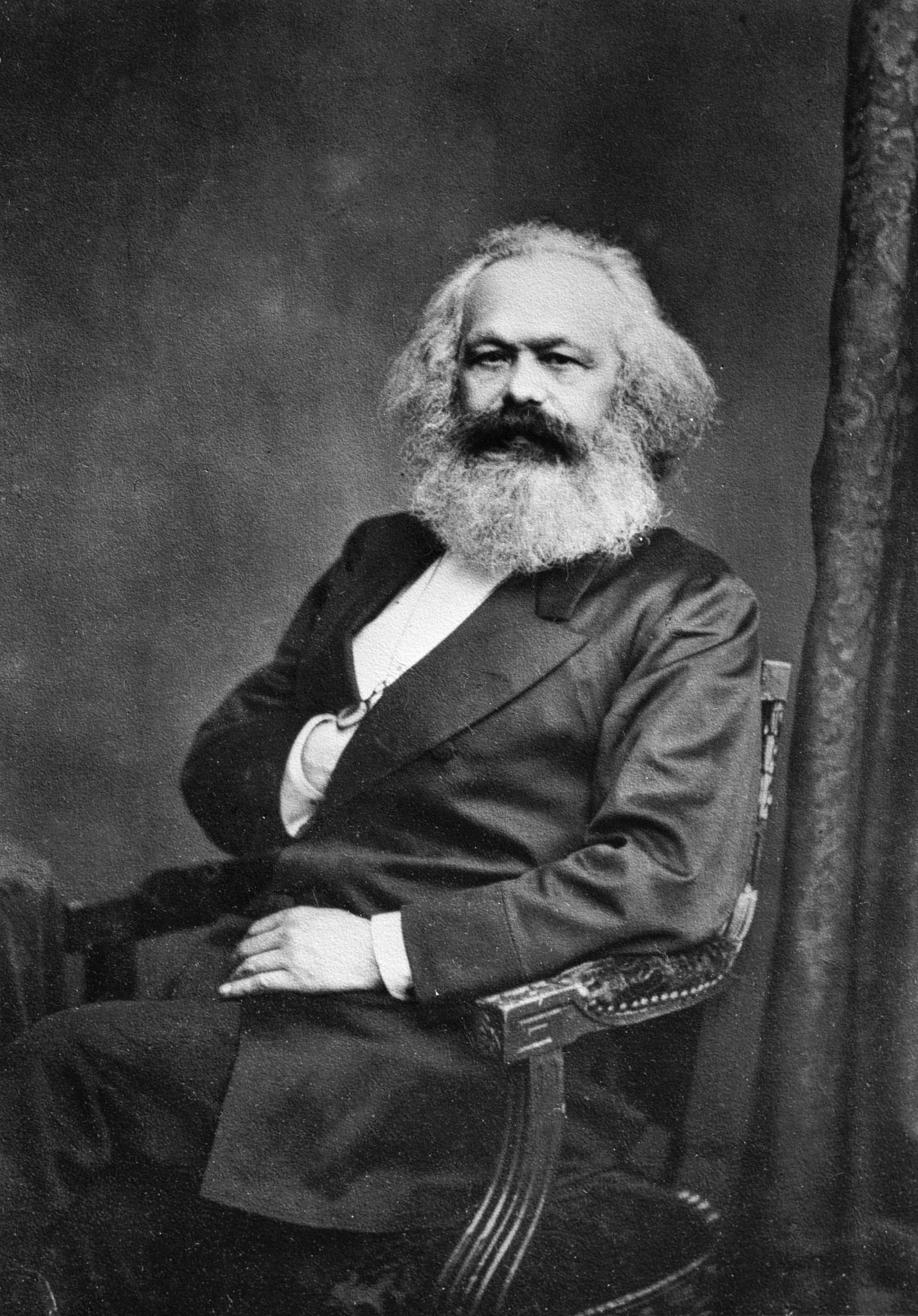
Karl Marx

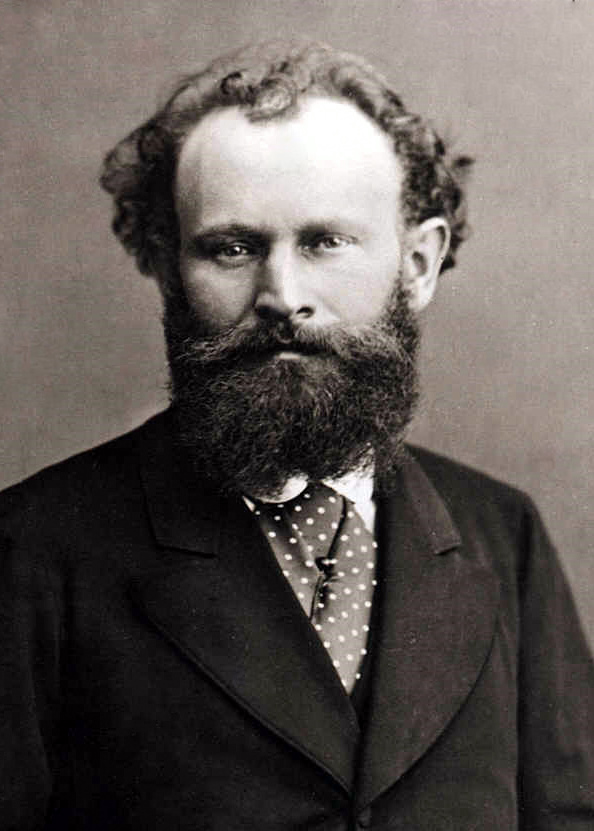
Édouard Manet

- January 4 – Antoine Chanzy, French general and colonial governor (b. 1823)
- January 8 – Miska Magyarics, Slovene poet in Hungary (b. 1825)
- January 10
  - Samuel Mudd, American doctor to John Wilkes Booth (b. 1833)
  - Elling Eielsen, Norwegian Lutheran leader (b. 1804)
- January 17 – Matilde Diez, Spanish actress (b. 1818)
- January 23 – Gustave Doré, French artist (b. 1832)
- January 24 – Friedrich von Flotow, German composer (b. 1812)
- February 13 – Richard Wagner, German composer (b. 1813)
- February 15 – Prince Kachō Hiroatsu of Japan (b. 1875)
- February 17
  - Napoléon Coste, French guitarist and composer (b. 1806)
  - Vasudev Balwant Phadke, Indian revolutionary (b. 1845)
- February 18 – Francis Abbott, Australian astronomer (b. 1799)
- March 4 – Alexander Hamilton Stephens, Vice President of the Confederate States of America (b. 1812)
- March 14 – Karl Marx, German communist philosopher (b. 1818)
- March 20 – Charles Lasègue, French physician (b. 1816)
- March 21 – Grigol Orbeliani, Georgian poet and soldier (b. 1804)
- March 27 – John Brown, Scottish personal servant and favourite of Queen Victoria (b. 1826)
- March 28 – Napoleon Bonaparte Buford, American general and railroad executive (b. 1807)
- April 4 – Peter Cooper, American industrialist, inventor and philanthropist (b. 1791)
- April 13 – Archduchess Maria Antonietta of Austria, Princess of Tuscany (b. 1858)
- April 15 – Frederick Francis II, Grand Duke of Mecklenburg-Schwerin (b. 1823)
- April 16 – Charles II of Parma (b. 1799)
- April 26 – Napoleon Orda, Belarusian composer and artist (b. 1807)
- April 30 – Édouard Manet, French painter (b. 1832)
- May 6 – Cecilia Fryxell, Swedish educational pioneer (b. 1806)
- May 24 – Keʻelikōlani, princess of Hawaii (b. 1826)
- May 26 – Abdelkader El Djezairi, Algerian leader (b. 1808)
- June 6 – Ciprian Porumbescu, Romanian composer (b. 1853)
- June 11 – Caroline Leigh Gascoigne, English writer (b. 1813)
- June 20 – John Colenso, English-born mathematician and theologian, Bishop of Natal (b. 1814)
- June 26 – Edward Sabine, Irish astronomer (b. 1788)

=== July–December ===
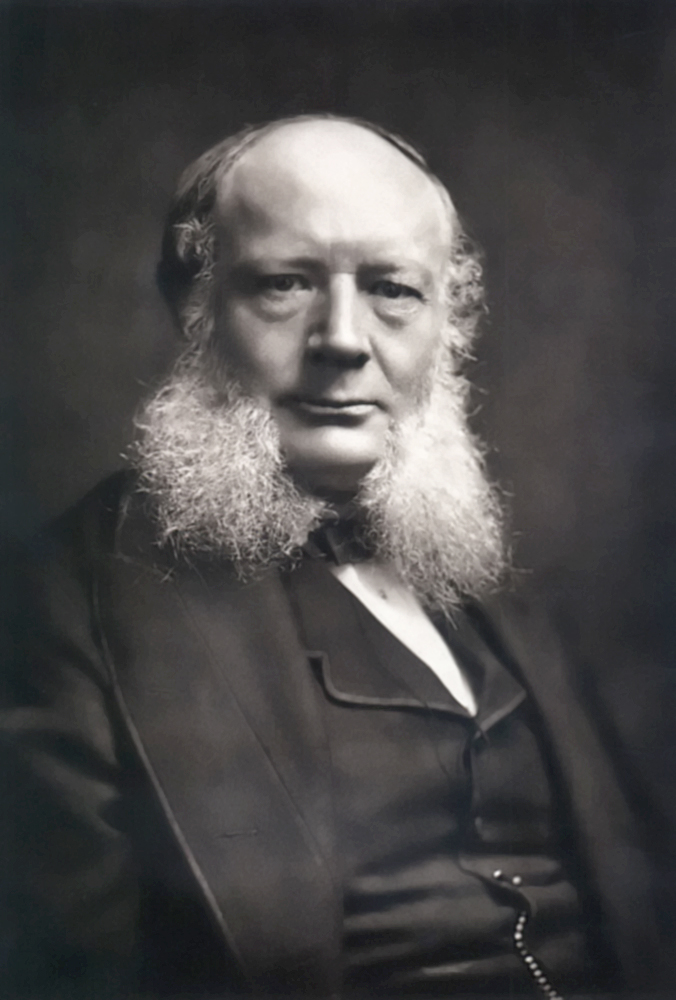
Carl Wilhelm Siemens

- July 15 – General Tom Thumb, American circus performer and entertainer (b. 1838)
- July 22 – Edward Ord, U.S. Army officer (b. 1818)
- July 23 – Rose Massey, English actress (b. 1851?)
- July 24 – Matthew Webb, English sailor, first recorded person to swim the English Channel without the use of artificial aids (b. 1848)
- July 27 – Montgomery Blair, American politician (b. 1813)
- July 28 – Carlo Pellion di Persano, Italian admiral and politician (b. 1806)
- August 24 – Henri, Count of Chambord, pretender to the French throne (b. 1820)
- August 25 – Louise Lateau, Belgian mystic and stigmatist (b. 1850)
- September 3 – Ivan Turgenev, Russian writer (b. 1818)
- September 10 – Otto Pius Hippius, Baltic German architect (b. 1826)
- September 17 – Junius Brutus Booth Jr., American actor and theatre manager (b. 1821)
- September 24 – Selina Jenkinson, British aristocrat (b. 1812)
- October 5 – Joachim Barrande, French palaeontologist (b. 1799)
- October 14 – Sir Arthur Elton, 7th Baronet, English writer and Liberal Party politician (b. 1818)
- October 20 – George Chichester, 3rd Marquess of Donegall, Anglo-Irish landowner, courtier and politician (b. 1797)
- October 22 – Thomas Mayne Reid, Irish-American novelist (b. 1818)
- October 30
  - Dayananda Saraswati, Hindu religious leader (b. 1824)
  - Robert Volkmann, German composer (b. 1815)
- November 19 – Carl Wilhelm Siemens, German engineer (b. 1823)
- November 20 – Tenshoin, wife of 13th Shōgun of Japan, Tokugawa Iesada (b.1836)
- November 29 – Elisabeth Dieudonné Vincent, Haitian-born migrant and free woman of colour (b. 1798)
- December 13 – Victor de Laprade, French poet and critic (b. 1812)
- December 27 – Andrew A. Humphreys, American general and civil engineer (b. 1810)

=== Dates unknown ===
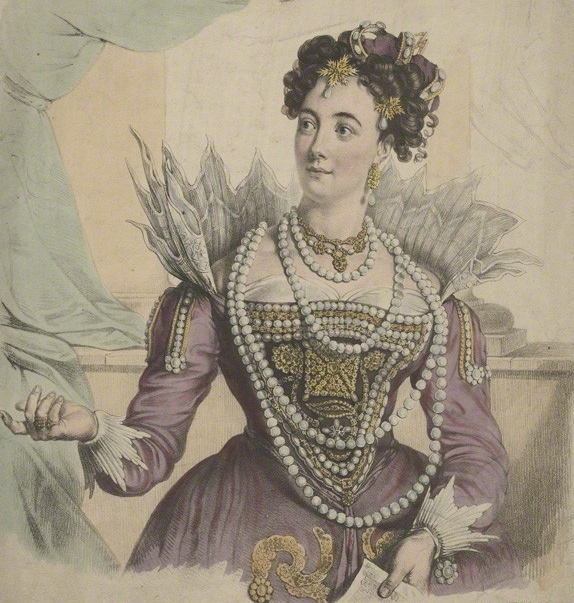
Margaret Agnes Bunn

- Margaret Agnes Bunn, British actress (b. 1799)
- Jules Miot, French republican socialist (b. 1809)
