= Miot =

Miot (English: /miˈoʊ/, French: [mjo]) is a surname. Notable people with the surname include:

- Joseph Serge Miot (1946–2010), Haitian archbishop
- Jules Miot (1809–1883), French political activist

== See also ==
- Massive Internet of things (MIoT)
