= Pedro Salinas Fuenzalida =

Chilean politician

Pedro Salinas

Member of the Chamber of Deputies of Chile
- In office 15 May 1926 – 6 June 1932
- Constituency: 9th departmental district (1926–1930); 7th department district (1930–1932)

Personal details
- Died: 25 July 1935
- Party: Liberal Democratic Party
- Spouse: Sara Saavedra Montt

Pedro Salinas Fuenzalida (died 25 July 1935) was a Chilean politician who served in the Chamber of Deputies of Chile as a member of the Liberal Democratic Party from 1926 to 1932.

== Early life and education ==
Pedro Salinas Fuenzalida was born to Manuel Salinas González and María Teresa Fuenzalida Guzmán.

== Career ==
Salinas was a member of the Liberal Democratic Party and served as its secretary. In the 1925 election he won a seat in the Chamber of Deputies of Chile representing the 9th departmental district of Maipo, Rancagua and Cachapoal. He was reelected in 1930, representing the 7th departmental district of Santiago. He and Rogelio Ugarte represented the chamber at the International Parliamentary Congress held in Rio de Janeiro, Brazil in 1927.

== Personal life ==
Salinas married Sara Saavedra Montt. He died from pneumonia on 25 July 1935.

== Works cited ==
- "Pedro Salinas Fuenzalida". Library of the National Congress of Chile. Archived from the original on 19 October 2026.
