= Chilean video game content rating system =

Calificación de videojuegos

Decree 51, February, 2017
- Territorial extent: Chile
- Enacted by: Ministry of Economy, Development and Tourism; Ministry of Education; Ministry General Secretariat of Government
- Enacted: February 8, 2017 (Note: Decree 51, February, 2017)
- Commenced: January 2, 2018 (Note: Decree 89, September, 2017)

Summary
- Reglamento que regula el contenido, forma, dimensiones y demás características de la leyenda que deban exigir los videojuegos
- Status: Current legislation

The Chilean video game content rating system (Spanish: "Calificación de videojuegos", colloquially "Ley de etiquetado de videojuegos") is a set of laws enacted in Chile in 2018 to create a local video game rating system that would regulate the sale of video games in Chile without depending on outside ratings boards like the ESRB or PEGI.

== Classifications ==
Classification	Name	Description (Note: Unofficial English translations)	Minimal age
Especialmente recomendado	Especialmente Recomendado	«Videojuego especialmente recomendado para niños y adolescentes: por contener material educativo y ningún material inapropiado para su edad.» «Video game especially recommended for children and adolescents: for containing educational material and no inappropriate material for their age.»	All ages
Toda edad	Toda Edad	«Videojuego sin contenido objetableque puede ser visto por personas de cualquier edad.» «Video game without objectionable content that can be viewed by people of any age.»	All ages
8 años o más	8 años o más	«Videojuego no recomendado para menores de 8 años por contener un porcentaje menor de lenguaje inapropiado, insinuaciones sexuales o violencia.» «Video game not recommended for children under 8 years of age because it contains a lower percentage of inappropriate language, sexual innuendoes or violence.»	8 years or older
14 años o más	14 años o más	«Videojuego no recomendado para menores de 14 años por contener un porcentaje moderado de lenguaje inaprpiado, insinuaciones sexuales o violencia.» «Video game not recommended for people under 14 years of age because it contains a moderate percentage of inappropriate language, sexual innuendoes or violence.»	14 years or older
18 años o más	18 años o más	«Videojuego no recomendado para menores de 18 años por contener un porcentaje importante de lenguaje vulgar, material sexual explícito, desnudez frecuente o importantes niveles de violencia.» «Video game not recommended for people under 18 years of age because it contains a significant percentage of vulgar language, explicit sexual material, frequent nudity or significant levels of violence.»	18 years or older

If the game has only just been submitted for rating, a label marked, "Mientras resuelve en definitiva el Consejo de Calificación Cinematográfica" ("While the Film Rating Council definitively resolving"), may appear.

=== Ratings Criteria ===
The agency in charge of classifying video games marketed in Chile is the Film Rating Council. According to the guide published by the Library of Congress, video games released in Chile do not need to be rated if it had already been pre-classified in its country of origin, upon approval by Chile's Cinematrographic Qualification Council.

Video game manufacturers and importers are only permitted by law to sell and lease video games that are not suitable for minors to those who present a photo ID. Violators are subject to fines as well as the confiscation of such video games.
