= Rogelio Ugarte =

Chilean politician

Member of the Chamber of Deputies of Chile
- In office 15 May 1926 – 6 June 1932
- Constituency: 7th Department District

Personal details
- Born: 10 June 1872 Santiago, Chile
- Party: Radical Party
- Spouse: María Eugenia Labbé
- Children: 4

Rogelio Ugarte Bustamante (10 June 1872 – ) was a Chilean politician and journalist who served in the Chamber of Deputies of Chile from 1926 to 1932, as a member of the Radical Party. He also served as mayor of Santiago.

== Early life and education ==
Rogelio Ugarte Bustamante was born in Santiago, Chile, on 10 June 1872, to José Santos Ugarte Serrano and Mercedes Bustamante Valdivieso. He attended Rafael Valentín Valdivieso High School.

== Career ==
Juan Agustín Palazuelos and Ugarte founded the newspaper La Ley and Ugarte later served as manager and owner.

Ugarte was active in the local politics of Santiago. He was elected second mayor in 1906, and mayor in 1907; he served as mayor for five terms. He served on the city council. He promoted replacing oil with electricity as the energy source of lighting.

Ugarte was a member of the Radical Party, but was expelled. He joined the Independent Radical Party and was elected to the Chamber of Deputies of Chile from the 7th Department District in the 1925 election. He later rejoined the Radical Party and served on its central committee. He was reelected in the 1930 election. During his tenure he served as president of the Internal Government and Budgets and Objected Decrees committees. He and Pedro Salinas Fuenzalida represented the chamber at the International Parliamentary Congress held in Rio de Janeiro, Brazil in 1927.

== Personal life ==
Ugarte married María Eugenia Labbé Letelier, with whom he had four children.

== Works cited ==
- "Luis Ayala Poblete". Library of the National Congress of Chile. Archived from the original on 17 October 2026.
- "Pedro Salinas Fuenzalida". Library of the National Congress of Chile. Archived from the original on 19 October 2026.
- Martland, Samuel (2002). "Progress illuminating the world: street lighting in Santiago, Valparaiso and La Plata, 1840–90". Urban History. 29 (2). Cambridge University Press: 223–238. doi:10.2307/44613322. JSTOR 44613322.
