= Mary Helen Young =

Scottish nurse and resistance worker (1883–1945)

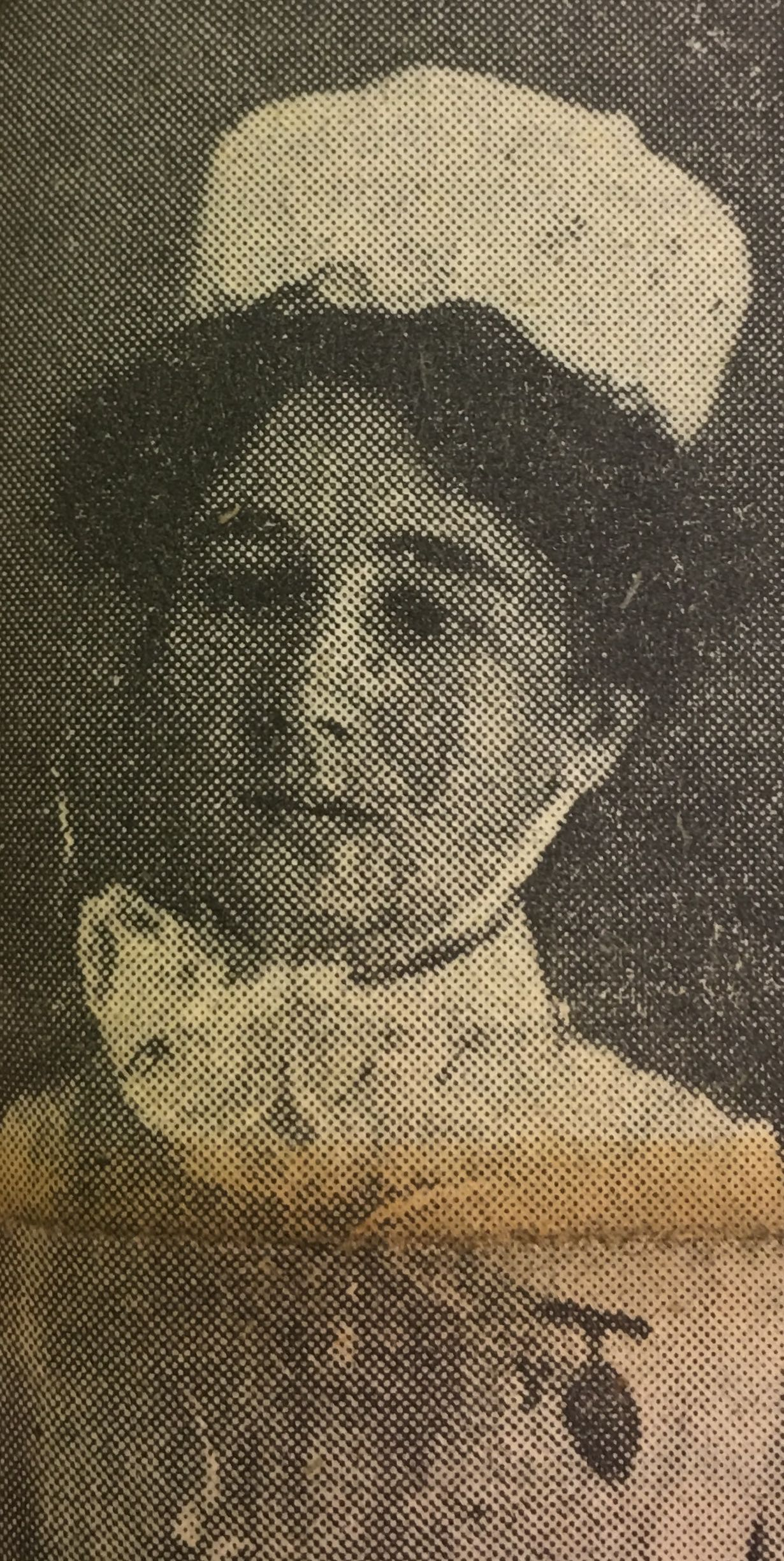
- Portrait of Mary Helen Young from Aberdeen Press and Journal 27 September 1945.
- Born: 5 June 1883; Aberdeen, Scotland
- Died: 14 March 1945 (aged 61); Ravensbrück concentration camp, Nazi Germany
- Cause of death: Gas chamber
- Other name: Marie Hélène Young
- Occupation: Nurse
- Known for: Assisting the French Resistance, murdered by the Nazis

Mary Helen Young (5 June 1883 – 14 March 1945) was a Scottish nurse and resistance fighter who helped British servicemen escape from Nazi-occupied France during World War II. She was imprisoned by the Gestapo and put to death at Ravensbrück concentration camp in 1945.

== Early life ==
Young was born on 5 June 1883 in Aberdeen to Elizabeth Ann Burnett (1854–1884) and Alexander Young (1855–1913), a clerk. Her mother died while she was a baby, after which she moved with her family, her father and two elder siblings, to Edinburgh. After school, she worked as a dressmaker at Jenners department store. She left Edinburgh in 1904 to go to Surrey to train as a nurse, gaining state registration in 1908. In 1909 she travelled to Paris, France, to work as a private nurse.

== World War I ==
At the outbreak of World War I Young volunteered for service with the British Red Cross, working in the British Army zone in France, nursing wounded troops on the Western Front. Young's fiancé was killed in World War I. After the war, she returned to private nursing in Paris travelling occasionally to Scotland to visit her sister Annie Sutherland in Aberdeen and her aunt in Ballater.

== World War II and imprisonment ==
When the Nazis occupied Paris in June 1940 Young chose to remain in the city and continue her nursing work. In December of that year, she was sent to an internment camp for allied civilians near Besançon and released after about six months as result of poor health, from where she returned to Paris. Despite being under surveillance by the Gestapo she received, into her home at 69 Rue Laugier, people sent from Britain who were assisting with the French Resistance. Her apartment was also used as a base for sending and receiving covert radio transmissions from London. On 11 November 1943 she was arrested and interrogated by the Gestapo on suspicion of helping British servicemen escape. In February 1944 she was sent to Ravensbrück concentration camp for women, as a political prisoner. News of her death did not reach Scotland until September 1945.

== Post-war ==
After the war, investigations by the British Embassy in Paris and United Nations War Crimes Commission proved that Young had been put to death by the Germans by being "put in a gas chamber or otherwise" sometime between February and March 1945.

Her sister and sole next-of-kin, Elizabeth Ann Sutherland, raised a legal action to settle Young's estate. On 30 January 1948 at the Court of Session, Lord Blade issued a judgement that presumed Young's death had occurred on 14 March 1945. Evidence given at the trial included letters that spoke to her courage and cheerfulness.

The French novelist, Simone Saint-Clair, who was also an inmate at Ravensbrück, said of her, "She always kept her chin up ... and all of us liked the little Scotswoman, Mees Young".

Young has been compared to nurse Edith Cavell who was executed by firing squad by the Germans in World War I.
