= Louise Lateau =

Belgian mystic

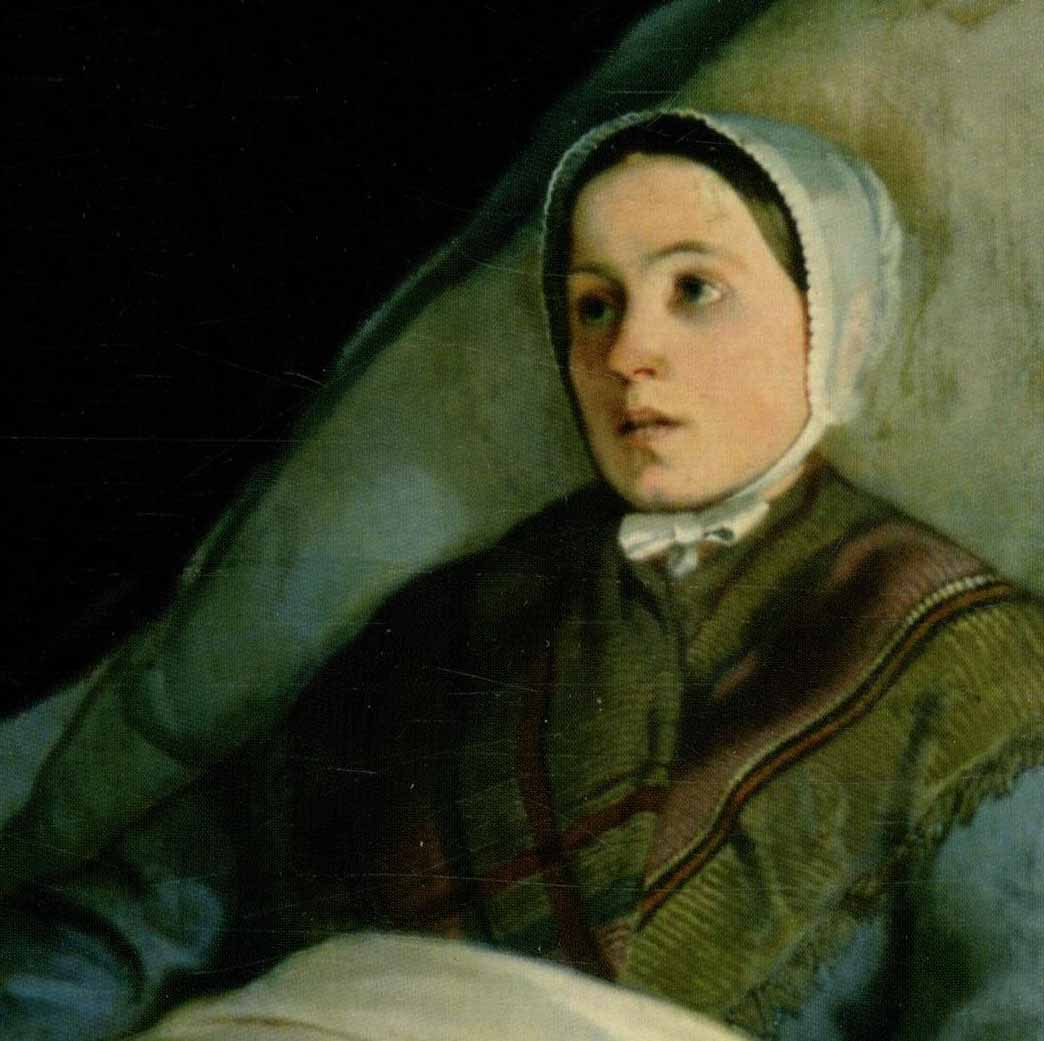
Louise Lateau

Louise Lateau (born 29 January 1850 at Bois-d'Haine, in Belgium, died on 25 August 1883 at Bois-d'Haine) was a mystic and stigmatist.

The case of Louise Lateau is one of the best documented of those who received the stigmata. She was famous in the 1860s because of her mystical trances and between 1868 and 1883 she was observed by many physicians, members of the clergy and visitors.

== Early life ==
Historian David Blackbourn has pointed out that a number of features in Lateau's life are similar to that of other mystics such as Anna Katharina Emmerick and to the experiences of visionaries such as Bernadette Soubirous and Catherine Labouré. All suffered from harsh treatment, early separation from family or the loss of family members, and a life of dependency and poverty.

Lateau's father died of smallpox ten weeks after her birth. Louise also contracted the disease and was saved with much difficulty. At age 11, Lateau's mother put her out to work as a housemaid. Shortly thereafter, Lateau was brought back by her mother and had to work as a dressmaker. During a cholera epidemic in Bois-D’Haine in 1866, Lateau, then 16, nursed six of the epidemic victims. The following year, she became seriously ill herself; the disease lasted until 1868. On 15 April 1868, she was so ill that she received the last rites. Ten days later, she had her first experience of the stigmata.

== The stigmata ==
Beginning 24 April 1868, pain recurred every Friday and blood began to flow from her left side and feet. On 8 May, blood came from both hands as if from nail wounds. On 25 September, the stigmata was completed by the appearance on the breast of four small spots of blood as if coming from four pinpricks to the heart.

The wounds appeared without apparent cause on the night of Thursday to Friday and disappeared the next night. They occurred every Friday until her death in 1883; for the rest of the week, Lateau continued to work for her family.

Lateau's claims of stigmata were disputed by Donovan Rawcliffe, who suggested they were self-inflicted, caused by "extreme emotional or other psychogenic factors following intense concentration on the crucifixion."

== Ecstasies ==
On 17 July 1868, the phenomenon of the bleeding of the stigmata was accompanied by an ecstasy, which returned every Friday in the form of a trance-like state that lasted for a total of 8 hours. The first ecstasy took place at 6:00 AM, after the distribution of Communion. A second occurred around 2:00 PM.

During the ecstasy, Lateau would stay in contemplation for hours. While she didn't seem to perceive what was going on around her, she would change position and move around the room. Her face usually expressed joy but also the fear and sadness of the Passion of Christ. The ecstasy ended after the mime of the Crucifixion and the Agony of Christ held in the parish church.

She was insensitive to pain and noises, but could briefly exit the ecstasy following a request of the parish priest of Bois-d'Haine or some clergymen. Lateau claimed to see visions of the passion of Christ, the Virgin Mary, and saints.

Lateau continued to live with her mother and sisters and worked for her family. These phenomena, however, began to attract attention, particularly beginning in 1871.

It was alleged that Lateau could abstain from food. However, this claim was investigated and proven false (see below).

== Ecclesiastical and scientific enquiries ==
At the end of 1868, the Bishop of Tournai, Gaspar-Joseph Labis, opened a canonical investigation into Lateau. The commission was made up of clerics; a layperson, who was Minister of State Adolphe Dechamps; and a physician, Dr. Lefebvre of the Catholic University of Louvain. The investigation acknowledged Lateau's sincerity and the authenticity of the facts and concluded that science could find no rational explanation as to what had happened to her.

In 1874, the Royal Academy of Medicine of Belgium opened an investigation. For five months, Lateau was observed by experts appointed by the academy. The conclusions of the investigation were published in 1875. Their conclusion was that there was no conscious deception in the stigmata and the ecstasies.

Physician Évariste Warlomont suggested attributing the phenomena to "double consciousness" (later termed dissociative identity disorder). French neurologist Désiré-Magloire Bourneville argued that all of Lateau's phenomena were symptoms of hysteria. German psychiatrist Albert Moll suggested that a "natural explanation of the facts is possible, because such things can be induced by suggestion in a suitable mental state. The conditions resemble each other; the ecstasy of Lateau has a great likeness to the hypnotic state. Ecstasy and hypnosis have many points in common."

The abstention from food and the cessation of sleep were not medically attested by the commission. The latter had not been possible as they were unable to carry out permanent monitoring in the family home. Experts from the commission advocated an observation of several days in a hospital, but this was not done. Food, however, was found. According to skeptic Bergen Evans, "Dr Warlomont, an uncouth and discourteous fellow who was sent to investigate her claims by the Belgian Royal Academy of Medicine, unexpectedly wrenching upon a cupboard in her room, found a cache of food, and got Miss Lateau to admit that, while she never slept, she was subject to nocturnal periods of forgetfulness."

== Death ==
Lateau died on August 25, 1883.

On 5 March 2009, the Vatican gave a negative answer to an enquiry wishing to further the cause for her possible beatification.
