= Jules Miot =

French republican socialist

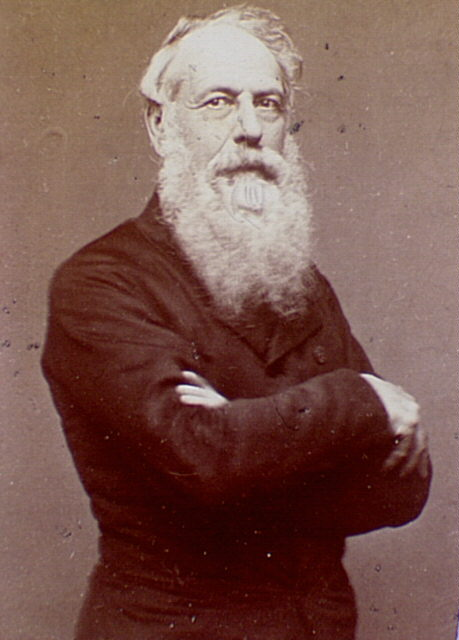
Jules Miot.

Jules Miot (French: [ʒyl mjo]; 1809–1883) was a French republican socialist who participated in the French Revolution of 1848 and in the Paris Commune of 1871. He was also a member of the First International.

== Life ==
Jules François Miot was born in Autun on 14 September 1809. He studied medicine and pharmacology in Paris and became a pharmacist at Moulins-Engilbert (Nièvre). As a young man he became involved in republican secret societies. He took part in the July Revolution of 1830. He participated in the Revolution of 1848 and was elected to the National Assembly on 13 May 1849, where he sat as a radical republican socialist deputy. In 1849 he opposed the election of Louis Bonaparte to the presidency and condemned Bonaparte's campaign against the Italian revolutionaries. After Bonaparte's coup d'état of 2 December 1851 (when Bonaparte proclaimed himself emperor Napoléon III of the Second Empire), Miot was arrested and banished to a penal colony in Algeria. In 1860, an amnesty enabled him to return to France, where he edited the journal Le Modéré and worked as a pharmacist. He also resumed his clandestine republican activities. He was arrested again in 1862 and sentenced to three years in prison.

After his release, Miot went into exile in London, where he joined the First International. In 1871, Napoléon III was captured in the course of the Franco-Prussian War, and on 4 September the Third Republic was proclaimed. Miot returned to Paris, where he helped organise the defence of the besieged city and participated in the Paris Commune. In February 1871 he was a candidate for the National Assembly but was not elected. On 26 March 1871 he was elected to the Council of the Commune by the nineteenth district (arrondissement). He served on the Committee of Education and the Committee of Barricades. On 4 March he proposed the establishment of the Committee of Public Safety, which was accepted by a majority of the Council, over vigorous protests from the minority. After the suppression of the Commune in May, Miot escaped to Switzerland. He was sentenced to death in absentia. In 1880, a general amnesty for Communards enabled him to return to France. He died on 9 May 1883 in Adamville (Seine).

Jules Miot was significant as a link between the Jacobin republicanism that hearkened back to the first French Revolution and the revolutionary socialist movement of the nineteenth century (along with Charles Delescluze and Félix Pyat). He represented the Jacobin minority in the French section of the First International, but played a leading role in the majority of the Council of the Paris Commune. Although he worked closely with the followers of Louis Auguste Blanqui, he was not formally a member of the Blanquist organisation.

== Writings ==
1830: Réponse à Deux Libelles. 1860: L'Heure Suprême de l'Italie.

== Sources ==
- Aurousseau, H., 'Jules Miot, Pharmacien et Homme Politique.' Revue de l'Histoire de la Pharmacie. No. 37, September 1938 (Issue 103), pp. 341–349.
- Maitron, J. (ed.), Dictionnaire Biographique du Mouvement Ouvrier Français. Part I, Vol. 3. Paris, 1966, pp. 105–106.
- Nöel, B., Dictionnaire de la Commune. Paris, 1978.
- Robert, A., Bourloton, E., and G. Cougny (ed's), Dictionnaire des Parlementaires Français de 1789 à 1889. Online at: http://www.assemblee-nationale.fr/sycomore/fiche.asp?num_dept=10959.
