= Library of the National Congress of Chile =

- Biblioteca del Congreso Nacional de Chile
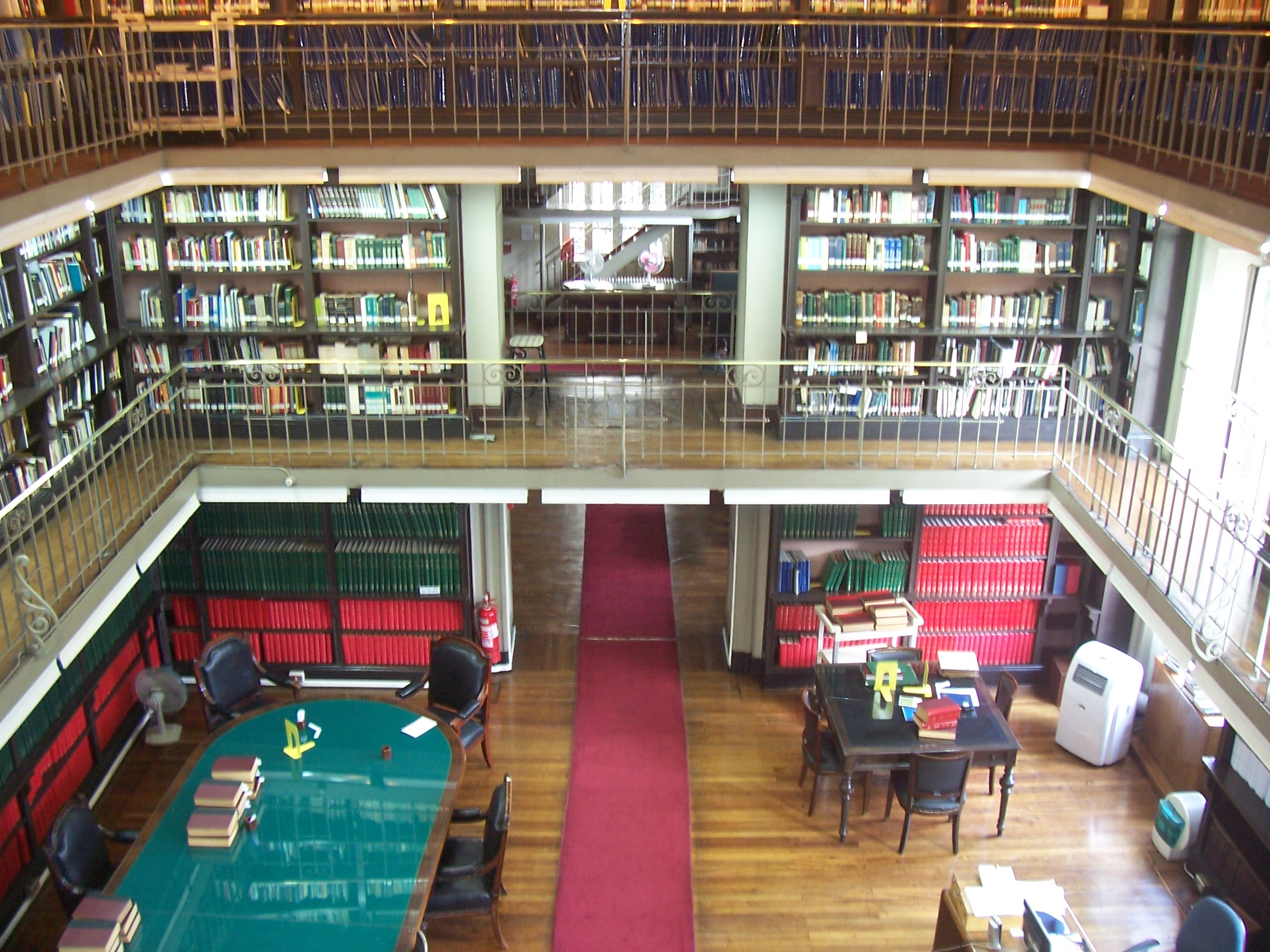
- Inside the Library of Congress of Chile in 2007
- 33°2′54″S 71°36′20″W
- Location: Victoria s/n - Edificio del Congreso Nacional de Chile, 2340000 Valparaíso, Chile
- Established: November 14, 1883; 142 years ago

Access and use
- Access requirements: 18+

Other information
- Director: Diego Matte Palacios
- Parent organization: National Congress of Chile
- Website: www.bcn.cl

The Library of the National Congress of Chile (Spanish: Biblioteca del Congreso Nacional de Chile, BCN) is a service of the National Congress of Chile that serves as an information center for the Senate and the Chamber of Deputies. The library advises parliamentarians in the social sciences, law, legislation, history, and the development of Chile.

Among its responsibilities are the maintenance of free access to current Chilean law. It also provides parliamentarians and their work teams with advice via meeting minutes, reports, analytical data, and private seminars. It collects news clippings and offers information services and book lending.

Diego Matte Palacios assumed the charge of Director of the BCN on July 10, 2023, following former director, Manuel Alfonso Pérez Guiñez's passing.
