= Du Coudray =

Du Coudray is a surname. Notable people with the surname include:

- Angélique du Coudray (c. 1712–1794), French midwife
- Guillaume Alexandre Tronson du Coudray (1750–1798), French lawyer
- Philippe Charles Tronson du Coudray (1738–1777), French army officer
