= Jean Pierre de Caussade =

French Jesuit priest and writer

Jean Pierre de Caussade (7 March 1675 – 8 December 1751) was a French Jesuit priest and writer. He is especially known for the work ascribed to him known as Abandonment to Divine Providence, and also his work with the Nuns of the Visitation in Nancy, France.

== Life ==
Jean Pierre de Caussade was born in Cahors, now in Lot, France. He was spiritual director to the Nuns of the Visitation in Nancy, France, from 1733 to 1740. During this time and after he left Nancy, he wrote letters of instruction to the nuns. Some material ascribed to him was first published in 1861 by Henri Ramière under the title L’Abandon à la providence divine.

The standard English translation is that of Alga Thorold (1866–1936) published in 1933. A version edited by Fr. John Joyce, S.J., with an introduction by Dom David Knowles (Regius Professor of Modern History in the University of Cambridge), appeared in 1959 with the title Self-Abandonment to Divine Providence. Knowles places the writings in a line of development of Christian mysticism, as a work of great importance: "we may approach Père de Caussade ... looking back to St. John of the Cross and St. Francis de Sales and forward to St. Teresa of the Infant Jesus." There were no less than twenty-five editions of the work published between 1861 (the Ramière edition) and 1959.

However, according to research on The Treatise on Abandonment to Divine Providence, discussed in a paper by Dominique Salin S.J., emeritus professor at the Faculty of Theology at the Centre Sèvres, published in The Way, 46/2 (April 2007), pp. 21–36, "it now seems almost impossible that the author was in fact the Jesuit Jean-Pierre de Caussade" as "[n]othing in de Caussade's biography would suggest that this man was the author of a famous treatise" and the style of letters of spiritual direction that can genuinely be attributed to de Caussade "is far removed from the lyricism" marking it.

According to Dominique Tronc, a French author and editor of numerous works on Madame Guyon and her spiritual environment, Abandonment to Divine Providence was ″in fact adapted from Madame Guyon″ and is based on ″a manuscript by Madame Guyon which was later used by the Jesuit Jean-Pierre de Caussade for a final editing under the title L'abandon à la Providence divine″.

Whoever the author was, he or she (maybe even a certain "lady from Lorraine") believed that the present moment is a sacrament from God and that self-abandonment to it and its needs is a holy state – a belief which, in the theological climate of France at the time, may have been considered close to Quietist heresy. De Caussade himself was forced to withdraw for two years, 1731–1733, as spiritual director of a convent of nuns due to a charge of Quietism, but he was eventually acquitted of the charge. It may have been because of the spectre of being accused of Quietism (with the Church's condemnation of the Quietist movement and condemnation by Pope Innocent XI of the Quietest proponent Miguel de Molinos, and Molinos' death in the prison of Castel Sant'Angelo), the works attributed to de Caussade were kept unpublished until 1861, and even then they were edited by Ramière to protect them from charges of Quietism. A more authoritative version of these notes was published only in 1966. In his writings, the author is aware of the Quietists and rejects their perspective. Abandonment to Divine Providence has now been read widely for many years and is considered a classic in the spiritual life by Catholics and many others. Caussade spent years as preacher in southern and central France, as a college rector (at Perpignan and at Albi), and as the director of theological students at the Jesuit house in Toulouse, which is where he died.

== Works ==
- Instructions spirituelles en forme de dialogues sur les divers états d'Oraison, d'après le doctrine de M. Bossuet, évêque de Meaux, Perpignan 1741 (On Prayer: spiritual instructions on the various states of prayer according to the doctrine of Bossuet Bishop of Meaux)
- Bossuet, maître d'oraison, ed. by Henri Brémond, Paris 1931
- L'Abandon à la divine providence, Paris, 1966 (Abandonment to Divine Providence or The Sacrament of the Present Moment)
- Traité sur l'oraison du cœur, Paris 1981 (A Treatise on Prayer from the Heart)
- Lettres spirituelles, Paris 1962–1964 (Spiritual Letters)
