= Cléreaux affair =

1785–1791 legal controversy in France

The Cléreaux affair was a cause célèbre surrounding the prosecution and defense of Marie Cléreaux, a French domestic servant in Rouen who was accused of stealing from her employers, the Thibault (Note: Also spelled "Thibaut") brothers, in 1785 and sentenced to be hanged in 1788. On appeal, her advocate Louis François Froudière published a legal brief in which he argued that the Thibault brothers retaliated against Cléreaux after one of them tried to sexually assault her. Froudiére and Cléreaux also implied that one Thibault brother committed infanticide. The public was so enraged by the details in Froudière's legal brief that they stormed the Thibault home, set it on fire, and chased the brothers through the city. One of the brothers was injured and died a few days later. The judges declared the legal brief to be libelous and threw out the charges against Cléreaux after people repeatedly disrupted the court proceedings.

The surviving Thibault brother sued Froudière and accused the lawyer of abusing his position by printing lies in Cléreaux's defense. Guillaume Alexandre Tronson du Coudray presented Thibault's side in court, arguing that Froudière had purposely printed a scandalous story to advance his own career. In his legal responses, Froudière maintained that he had a duty to publish his client's defense in order to save her life. Ultimately, the Cléreaux affair was never resolved, because the proceedings were disrupted by the French Revolution in 1791.

== Case against Cléreaux ==
=== Background ===
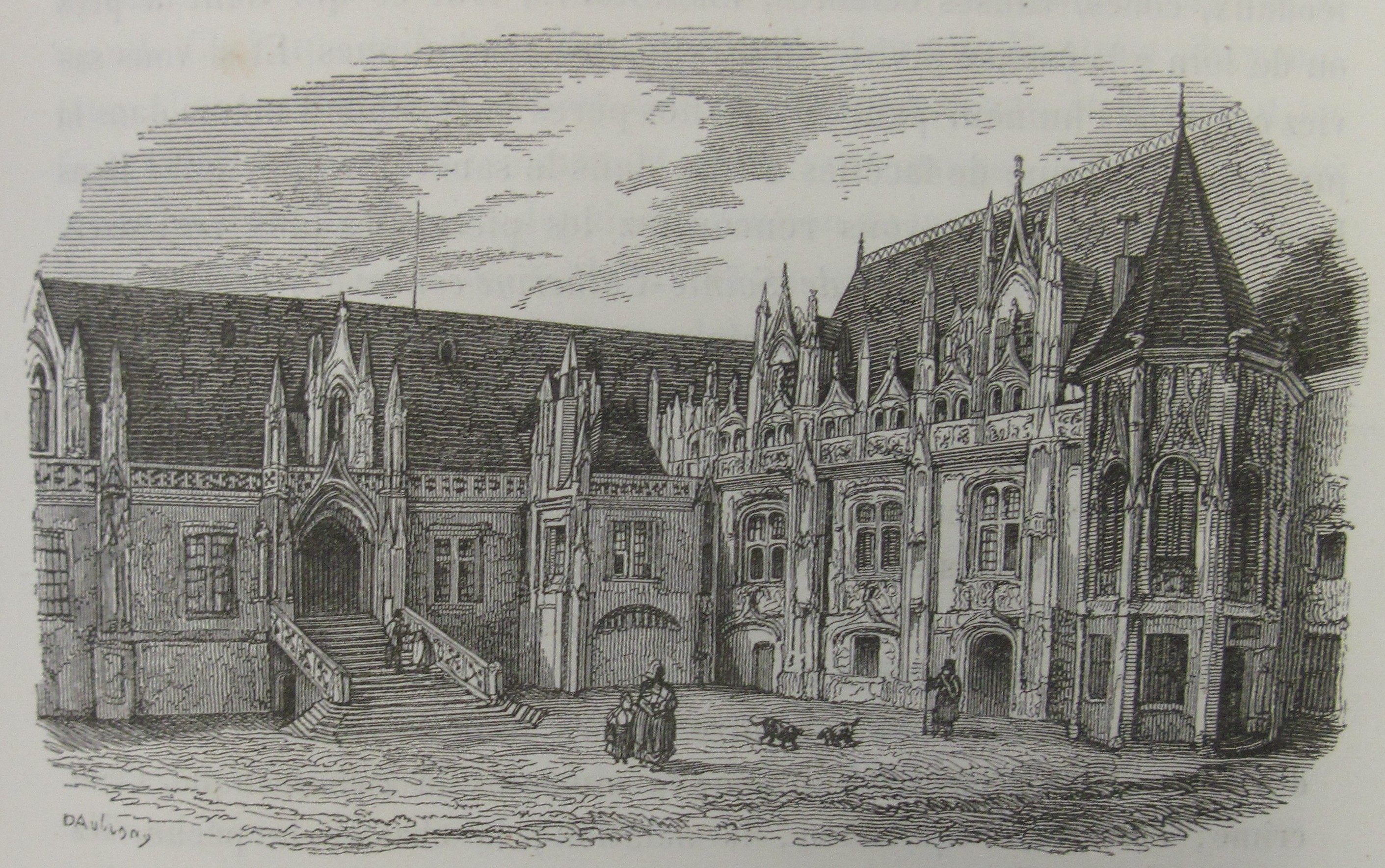
The Rouen Courthouse

Marie Cléreaux worked as a domestic servant for two wealthy brothers, the Thibaults, in Rouen. On 25 November 1785, the brothers searched her trunk and found 504 livres and some handkerchiefs that belonged to them. Differing accounts say that she admitted to having taken the handkerchiefs at first, or that she said the Thibault brothers had placed the handkerchiefs in her trunk. She maintained that the money was hers: either a gift or leftover from a settlement or furniture sale. The Thibaults dismissed Cléreaux and kept the money and her trunk of belongings, believing that she stole the money from someone else.

Cléreaux returned to their home and asked for her money and belongings back. The Thibaults refused to respond to her, so she escalated her complaint: first to the police, then to the courts. She tried to sue her former employers to return everything and pay an additional 200 livres in damages. After that, the Thibault brothers officially accused her of domestic theft, and she was convicted in the baillage court and condemned to be hanged in 1788. Cléreaux appealed the decision to the Parlement of Rouen and enlisted Louis-François-Bernard Froudière, an advocate from Rouen, to defend her.

=== Froudière's legal brief ===
Froudière wrote a 68-page memoire judiciaire (transl. legal brief) to present Cléreaux's side of the case, addressing it to the magistrate. Froudière's memoire was exempt from the censorship laws for the press under the ancien régime, because it was a legal briefing bearing his signature and, therefore, carried the credibility and authority of his profession as an advocate.

In his memoire, written partially from a first-person perspective, Froudière describes Cléreaux waking up late one night to the sound of a woman and a baby crying. She recognized the woman's voice as belonging to another servant in the household named Marie-Anne Delaunay. She followed the sound of the crying, which was coming from one of the Thibaut brother's rooms; a "strong light" from a "large fire" was glowing under the door. When she called out to ask what was wrong, Thibault answered from behind the door and told her to leave. Then she suddenly heard a "frightful shriek" followed by "perfect silence". Horrified, she returned to her room. She repeatedly asked both Thibault and Delaunay what had happened that night, but neither of them would reveal anything to her. The implication of Cléreaux's story was that the Thibault brother had an affair with his servant and then murdered his own child in the fireplace.

Sometime after this event, the household returned from a stay in the countryside, and Thibault repeatedly made sexual advances toward Cléreaux, which she rejected. Historian Sarah Maza writes that this harassment escalated one day when Thibault "aggressed [Cléreaux] physically, stark naked and wielding a knife". Cléreaux immediately resigned and asked for her wages, but the Thibault brothers refused to pay her. Maza says that, according to Froudiére, this is the point that the brothers invented the allegation of theft, in order to protect their own reputations by condemning Cléreaux. As this was the eve of the French Revolution, the story of a poor citizen enduring "aristocratic fraud and cruelty" spread "like wildfire" throughout Paris.

=== Public outcry and aftermath ===
The Cléreaux affair became a cause célèbre, and the public was enraged by the events portrayed in Froudière's legal brief. A "furious mob" stormed the Thibault home, set it on fire, and chased the brothers through the city. The older Thibault brother, who was seventy years old, was trampled and gravely injured. He died several days later, and, when the family tried to bury him, people "interrupted his funeral" and "threw [his] coffin on the ground". People also repeatedly disrupted the court proceedings for Marie Cléreaux's appeal. Eventually the judges annulled the previous ruling, and they "ordered her release, without either acquitting her or finding her guilty".

The Parlement of Rouen issued a decree ordering the executioner to burn the Froudiére's memoire judiciaire as libelous. The decree also granted the surviving Thibault brother and Marie-Anne Delaunay the right to sue the author, Froudière, as well as the printer and distributor of the document.

== Case against Froudière ==
=== Arguments ===
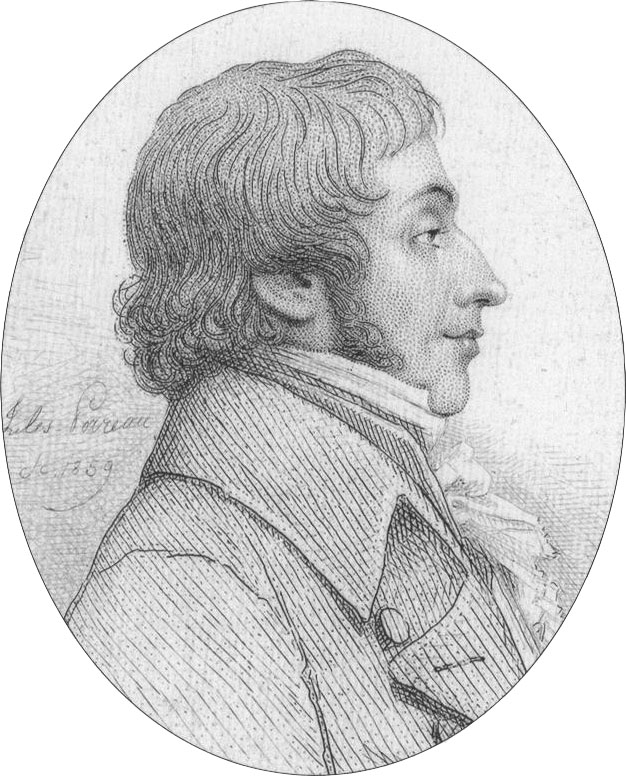
Guillaume Alexandre Tronson du Coudray

The surviving Thibault brother then brought charges against Froudière before the Parlement of Rouen and retained the lawyer Guillaume Alexandre Tronson du Coudray to plead his side in court. Tronson du Coudray would later serve as one of Marie Antoinette's lawyers, assisting Claude François Chauveau-Lagarde in her trial in 1793.

Tronson du Coudray argued that Froudière fabricated Cléreaux's story of infanticide and "aided in disseminating atrocious calumnies" in order to further his own career and gain notoriety. "The calumnies of Marie Clereaux[sic] were buried among the manucripts of the pleadings," he said, "[but] yours were scattered by the press all over Paris". Tronson du Coudray said that, in 1776, Froudière had also accused a priest in his parish of having an affair with his servant and then killing the child that was born from it. According to records ordered by the Parlement of Rouen, Froudière had had to pay damages and formally apologize for his statements against the priest back in 1776.

=== Response ===
In his counterarguments, Froudière asserted that he had an obligation to defend Marie Cléreaux in the manner that he did in order to save her life. He said that she was part of a "classe nombreuse de citoyens condamnés par le sort à subsister péniblement du travail de leurs mains ... sans lumières, sans connaissances, sans appui, [et] étrangers aux affaires" (transl. "large class of citizens condemned by fate to subsist painfully through the labor of their hands ... without enlightenment, without support, [and] strangers to public affairs"). As historian Hans-Jurgen Lüsebrink writes, advocates like Froudière used these trials as "forum[s] pour la pensée des Lumières", or "forum[s] for Enlightenment thought", during the ancien régime.

The servant Delaunay also filed suit against Froudiére, and the proceedings continued until 1791. However, the cases were never resolved, because the proceedings were interrupted by the French Revolution.

== Legal briefs ==
=== Published by Froudière ===
- Legal brief for Marie Cléreaux, 1785 (Note: French: Mémoire justificatif pour la fille Cléreaux)
- Plea by Mr. Froudière on the Liberty of the Advocate and the Scope of Judicial Defense in Criminal Matters, 1789 (Note: French: Plaidoyer de M. Froudière sur la liberté de l'Avocat et l'étendue de la défense judiciaire en matière criminelle)
- Mr. Froudière's reply against Mr. Thibault, 1789 (Note: French: Réplique de M. Froudière contre le sieur Thibaut)
- Brief Memoire for Mr. Froudière against Marie-Anne Delaunay, servant of Mr. Thibault, 1789 (Note: French: Bref Mémoire pour M. Froudière contre Marie-Anne Delaunay, servante du sieur Thibaut)
