= Raimondo Capizucchi =

Italian Dominican friar and cardinal

His Eminence Raimondo Capizucchi O.P.
- Cardinal-Priest of Santo Stefano al Monte Celio (1681-87); Santa Maria degli Angeli (1687-91)
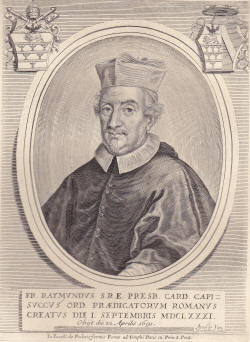

Orders
- Ordination: 1631
- Created cardinal: 1 September 1681 by Pope Innocent XI
- Rank: Cardinal-Priest

Personal details
- Born: Camillo Biagio; 7 November 1616 Rome
- Died: 20 April 1691 (aged 74) Rome
- Buried: Capizucchi Chapel, Santa Maria in Campitelli, Rome
- Denomination: Roman Catholic
- Parents: Paolo Capizucchi; Ortensia Marescotti

Raimondo Capizucchi (born as Camillo Biagio; 7 November 1616 – 20 April 1691) was an Italian nobleman, Dominican friar, and cardinal appointed by Pope Innocent XI.

== Biography ==
Camillo Biagio Capizucchi (or Cappisucchi) was born in Rome in 1616. Being one of the nine children (three boys and six girls, all of the latter becoming nuns) of marquess Paolo Capizucchi and Ortensia Marescotti, he was a scion of the noble Capizucchi family, one of the oldest families of the Roman nobility. After starting his studies at the Collegio Romano, on 8 June 1630 he entered the Dominican Order in the convent of Santa Maria sopra Minerva, changing his first name in Raimondo when he was ordained priest. One year later he took the vows.

In 1644, he became doctor of Theology, and was nominated coadjutor of Vincenzo Candido, Master of the Sacred Apostolic Palace (that is, leading Theologian of the Holy See) and prior of his monastery.

As a student, he was chosen to hold the yearly panegyric (Encomium of St. Thomas Aquinas) in front of the College of Cardinals in the Church of Santa Maria sopra Minerva, a very old tradition of Angelicum University which still takes place each 7 March, the old feast of the Saint.

Under the pontificates of Alexander VII (r. 1655–67) and Clement IX (r. 1667–69), he held various positions in the Roman Curia: in 1650 he was appointed secretary of the Sacred Congregation of the Index, in December 1651 he became examiner of the candidate bishops, and from November 1654, after the death of Candido, he was Master of the Sacred Apostolic Palace.

In 1663, Capizucchi was sacked from the latter position by Alexander VII, because he had allowed a publication critical of the pope. Afterwards, he secluded himself for the next 10 years in his monastery, writing books on theological issues, until in 1673, he was reinstated in his former position with a papal bull by pope Clement X (r. 1670–76). The same pope appointed him member with voting rights of the Congregations of the Holy Office, of the Rites, of the Indulgences, of the Index and for bishops.

As leading theologian of the church, in those years Capizucchi exercised a deep influence over Catholic theological positions, for example allowing the publication of the Exposition de la doctrine de l'église catholique sur les matières de controverse by Bossuet. Following the position of pope Innocent XI (r. 1676–89) he condemned probabilism, but at first he was fascinated by quietism as preached in Rome by the Spanish mystic Miguel de Molinos: in 1675 Capizucchi approved the publishing of de Molinos main work, the Spiritual Guide but, after his arrest in 1685, as cardinal Inquisitor he stuck to the harsh line of the pope against this doctrine and the Aragonese preacher, who died in 1696 in the prison of the Holy Office.

Pope Innocent XI elevated him to the rank of cardinal in the consistory of 1 September 1681 with the title of cardinal priest of Santo Stefano al Monte Celio; six years later he opted for the title of Santa Maria degli Angeli.

Capizucchi participated in the conclave of 1689 and was among those considered eligible candidates. He did not participate in the conclave of 1691, because he was already seriously ill. He died on 20 April 1691 at the age of 75, before the end of the conclave.

== Works and patronage ==
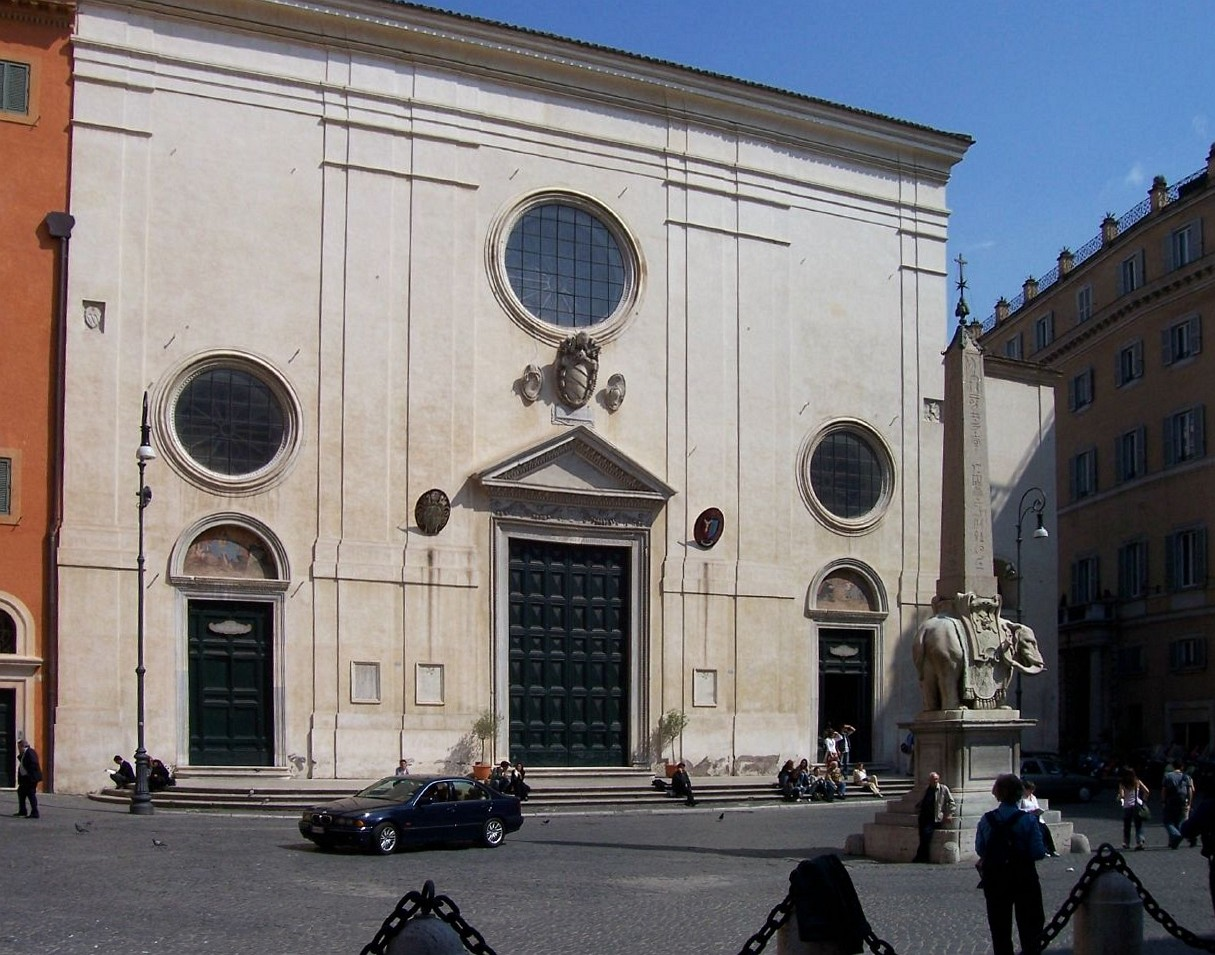
Church of Santa Maria sopra Minerva in Rome, at Capizucchi's time main center of the Dominican Order.

The panegyric on Saint Thomas Aquinas given by Capizucchi in front of the convened Cardinals in Santa Maria sopra Minerva (Oratio panegyrica in laudem Sancti Thomae Aquinatis) is his earliest surviving work.

As a theologian, his major work, dedicated to Cardinal Leopoldo de' Medici, is Controversiae theologicae selectae, scholasticae, morales, dogmaticae, scripturales, ad mentem D. Thomae Aquinatis ... resolutae, first published in 1670. This is a miscellanea of 28 theological problems, solved according to the philosophy of Thomas Aquinas. Among others, Capizucchi wrote a treatise about probabilism, De opinione probabili, and a history of his family, Historia della famiglia Capizucchi.

As a patron of the arts, in 1685 Cardinal Capizucchi commissioned the decoration by Mattia de Rossi of the chapel of San Paolo in the church of Santa Maria in Campitelli, giuspatronato of his family since 1390, where he was buried.

== Sources ==
- Nitti, Silvana (1975). "Capizucchi, Raimondo". www.treccani.it (in Italian). Dizionario Biografico degli Italiani.
- "Capizucchi". www.fiu.edu. The Cardinals of the Holy Roman Church. Archived from the original on 13 February 2018.
