= Tronson =

Tronson is a surname. Notable people with the surname include:

- Mark Tronson (born 1951), Australian Baptist pastor
- Robert Tronson (1924–2008), English film and television director

== See also ==
- Guillaume Alexandre Tronson du Coudray (1750–1798), French lawyer
- Philippe Charles Tronson du Coudray (1738–1777), French Army officer
