= 1689 conclave =

Election of Catholic Pope Alexander VIII

Papal conclave August–October 1689

Dates and location
- 23 August – 6 October 1689; Apostolic Palace, Papal States

Elected pope
- Pietro Vito Ottoboni; Name taken: Alexander VIII
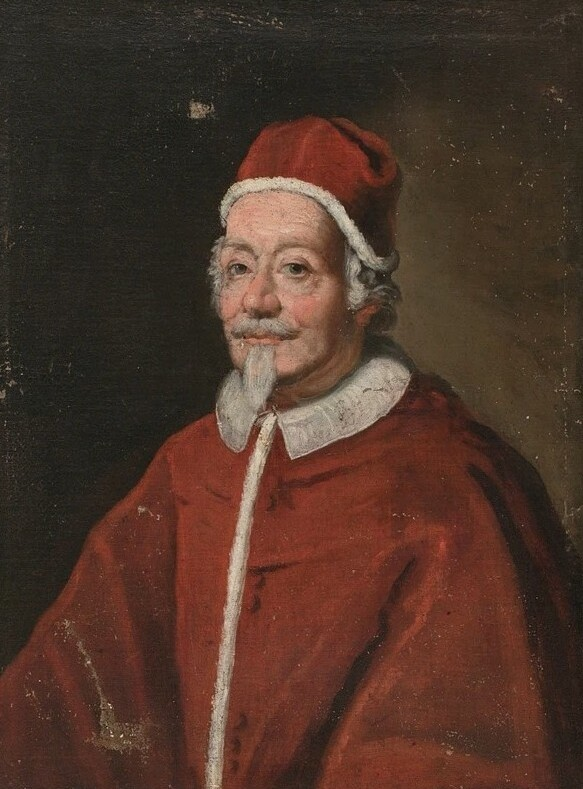

The 1689 papal conclave was convened after the death of Pope Innocent XI. It led to the election of Cardinal Pietro Vito Ottoboni as Pope Alexander VIII. The conclave saw the previous factions join together because they lacked numerical strength, and saw the rise of the zelanti as a political force in the election of the next pope. Ottoboni was eventually unanimously elected with the consent of the secular monarchs, becoming the first Venetian in over 200 years to be elected pope.

== Background ==
The central political issue concerning the papacy during the pontificate of Innocent XI was the diplomatic tension between the papacy and the French monarchy over the droit de régale, the claimed right of French monarchs to receive the income of dioceses during the interregnum between the death of one bishop and the installation of a new one. In response to a bull from Innocent condemning the practice, the French held a national synod in 1682, which upheld this right of the king. Innocent, in return, refused to confirm French bishops, causing there to be thirty-five vacancies by 1688. Louis XIV responded in kind, by seizing the papal territory Avignon.

In ecclesiastical affairs, Innocent was slow in creating cardinals, waiting until 1681, five years after his election, for his first creations. At that time, he created sixteen cardinals, all of whom were Italian. This caused anger among Catholic monarchs, because there were few remaining non-Italians in the college at that time. At his next creation of cardinals in 1686 he created twenty-seven cardinals, including one French cardinal and eleven other non-Italians. In total during Innocent's pontificate, he created a total of forty-three cardinals, while fifty-two had died.

== Conclave ==
Innocent XI died on 12 August 1689. At the time of his death, there were eight vacancies in the College of Cardinals. The conclave to elect his successor opened on 23 August 1689, but due to the late arrival of the French cardinals, no significant voting occurred until a month later. The French cardinals arrived to Rome on 23 September 1689, and entered the conclave on 27 September. Gregory XV's 1621 bull Aeterni Patris Filius set the threshold for election by scrutiny at two-thirds of participating electors.

Fifty-three cardinals participated in the 1689 conclave, and seven of those were non-Italian. Of the Italian cardinals, seventeen were from the Papal States. Innocent XI's creations were generally not aligned with any of the secular rulers at the time, and this was reflected in the election with the French faction having only five members, while the cardinals aligned with the Habsburgs, who ruled Spain and the Holy Roman Empire, only numbered seven. The Squadrone Volante, which had been a presence at recent conclaves, was not a factor in the 1689 conclave, due to the recent deaths of Christina, Queen of Sweden and Decio Azzolino. Instead, the college saw the rise of an influential zelanti faction with nine members who sought "[...] to elect the best pope, regardless of political ties."

Francesco Maria de' Medici took charge of the Spanish contingent while Rinaldo d'Este led the French factions. Flavio Chigi and Paluzzo Paluzzi Altieri degli Albertoni, who had previously led factions combined their forces due to their decreased number, and joined with Benedetto Pamphili and Medici. Charles d'Albert d'Ailly, who was the Duke of Chaulnes served with d'Este and the Marquis de Tore as Louis XIV's advisors regarding the conclave. Medici was joined by Luis Francisco de la Cerda as the Spanish ambassador to the Holy See. The Holy Roman Emperor, Leopold I, dispatched Anton Florian, Prince of Liechtenstein to the conclave as his representative, not being content to be represented by Medici. Liechtenstein was received in audience at the doors of the conclave on 27 September and d'Ailly on 2 October.

Raimondo Capizucchi and Gregorio Barbarigo were both considered early in the conclave, but neither was elected. There were rumours on 20 September that Barbarigo had been elected, but it was later reported that he had asked the cardinals not to vote for him.

== Election of Alexander VIII ==
Pietro Vito Ottoboni had been seen as the most qualified candidate since the opening of the conclave, but those supporting him moved circumspectly because it was anticipated that he would have enemies as a Venetian. He was supported by the zelanti, as well as by Chigi. Chigi eventually convinced Medici and Altieri to also support Ottoboni. He was not Leopold I's favoured candidate, and Louis XIV was initially opposed to his election, but both eventually consented. His supporters also promised that he would confirm the French bishops that Innocent XI had refused to confirm, and this was the final step in securing his election. Ottoboni was 79 when the conclave opened, and this was also seen as a positive factor in his election.

On 6 October 1689, Ottoboni was elected Pope Alexander VIII unanimously by forty-nine cardinal electors. He was the first Venetian pope in over two centuries. Ottoboni decided to take the name of Alexander in honour of Flavio Chigi's uncle, Alexander VII, as Chigi had aided in his election, and he also respected Pope Alexander III, who was popular among Venetians. He had originally considered taking the name Urban, in honour of Urban VIII, who had helped start his career, before he settled on Alexander.
