= Geneviève de Brunelle =

French counter-revolutionary (1742-1823)

Geneviève Gouin de Brunelles
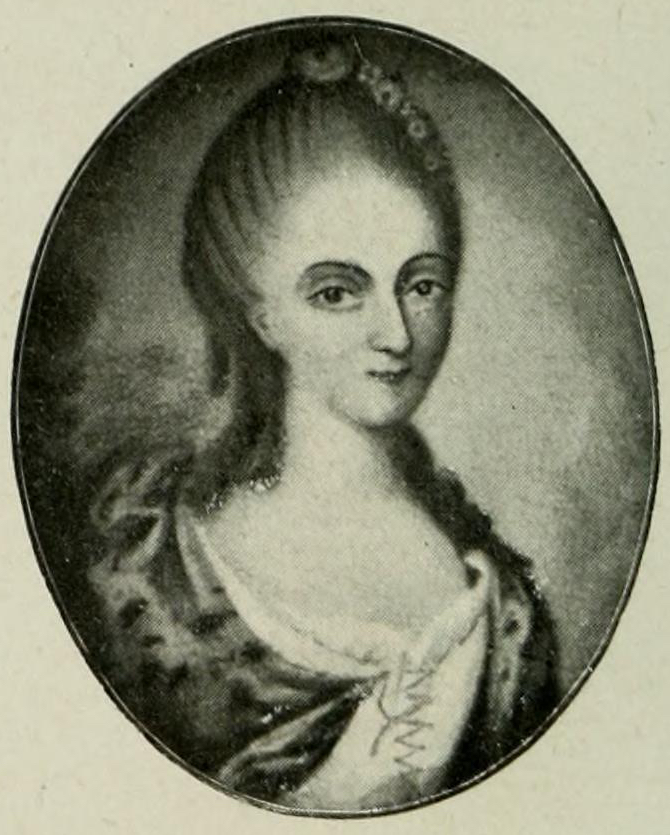
- Geneviève de Brunelle
- Born: 12 June 1742; Rouen, France
- Died: 23 October 1823 (aged 81); Rouen, France
- Burial place: Church of Saint-Georges d'Aubevoye
- Other name: Madame de Combray
- Occupation: Royalist during the French Revolution
- Children: 4

Geneviève de Brunelle, also known as the Marquise de Combray, (1742–1823), was a royalist and French counter-revolutionary, which means she supported the royal family during the French Revolution and later the First Empire of France.

== Biography ==
Geneviève born in Rouen on 12 June 1742, daughter of the knight Jean-Baptiste Gouin d' Epinay (died in 1747) and Madelaine Hubert de Tournebut, daughter of an advisor to the Grand Chamber of the Parliament of Normandy.

Geneviève of Brunelle married a nobleman, Jean-Louis Armand Emmanuel Hélie de Bonnœil (1732–1784). They had four children: Alexandre Louis César Hélie de Bonneuil (6 July 1762 – 8 December 1846), Auguste Louis Timoléon Hélie de Combray (1764–1849), Louise-Geneviève (1765-1830) and Caroline (1773–1809).

Under the Consulate and the First Empire, she sheltered half a dozen nuns and three Carthusians in her Château de Tournebut in Eure, Normandy.

=== Royalist activist ===
Geneviève played an important role in the Norman Chouannerie movement as one of the leaders with Colonel François Robert d'Aché, a former naval officer, during the French Revolution and during the reign of Napoleon I. She housed many royalists in her castle of Tournebut (in Aubevoye) and fomented royalist plots there to support the Empire.

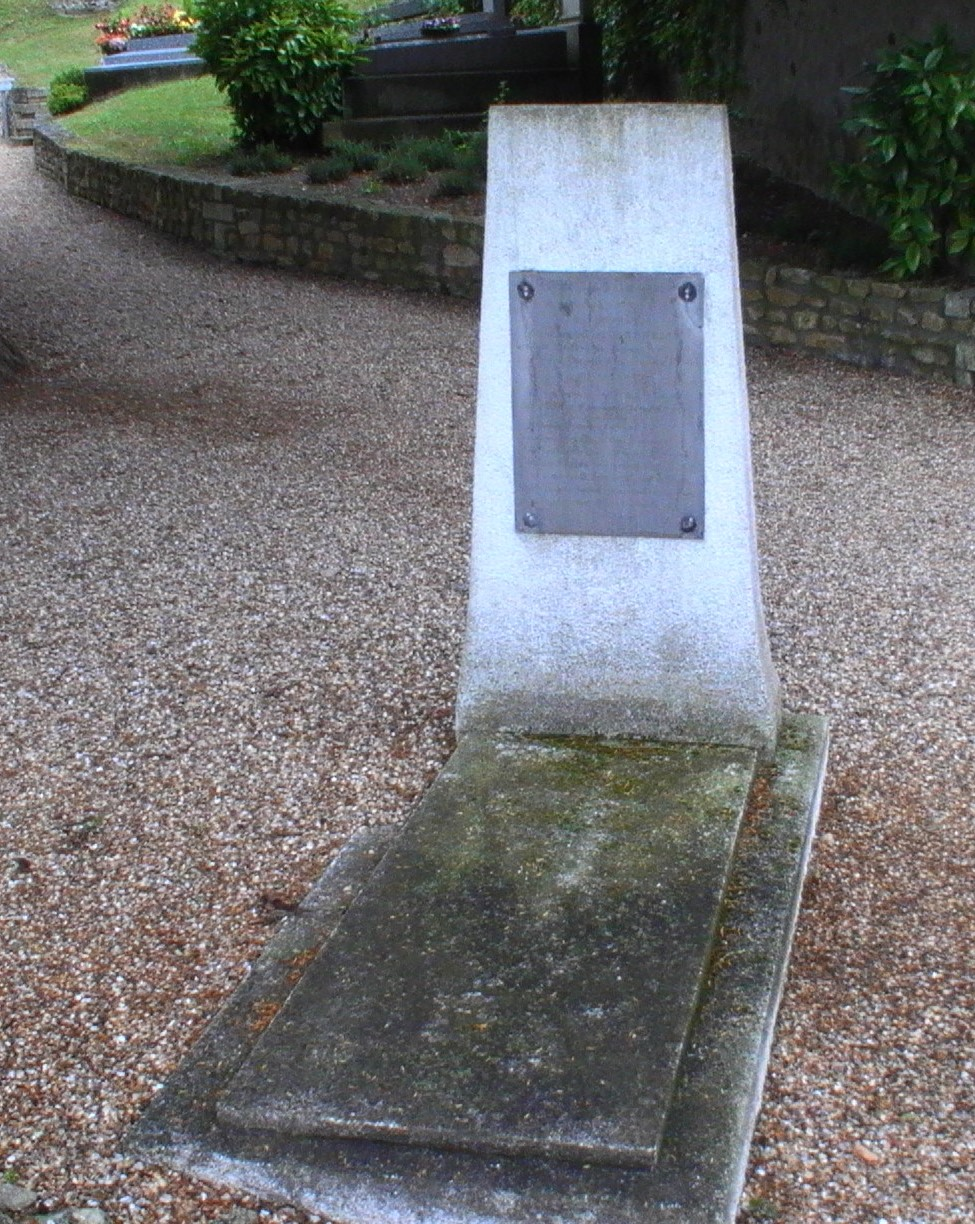
Tomb of the Marquise de Combray in Rouen, France.

On 7 June 1807, in the woods of Quesnay, an attack took place on the vehicle transporting the funds of the receivers of Argentan and Alençon. The attack was set up by the Chouan leader Armand-Victor Le Chevalier, lover of Caroline (Geneviève's youngest child) who participated in the preparations for the ambush. For her part, Geneviève helped transport funds after the attack and she was arrested on 20 August 1807, on orders from the prefect of Seine-inférieure Savoye-Rollin, and a zealous police officer, Pierre-François Réal.

During the trial, Geneviève and her daughter Caroline were defended by Claude François Chauveau-Lagarde, the same attorney who defended Marie Antoinette. Caroline was sentenced to death and, although she was allegedly pregnant, she was executed in October 1809. For her part, Geneviève was sentenced to prison for twenty-two years on 30 December 1808. She spent time in a penal colony and the pillory but during the latter, when she was exhibited in public, she was surrounded by high-quality ladies from Rouen who mounted an honor guard around the pillory's scaffold to protect her. Geneviève's conviction was overturned in August 1814, under the Bourbon Restoration.

=== Final years ===
On 18 August 1814, the Lordship of Combray was established as a marquisate in her favor and shortly thereafter, she had the honor of being presented to King Louis XVIII and the reinstated royal family, on 5 September 1814.

She died 23 October 1823 at 81 in her chateau and is buried in the enclosure of the Saint-Georges church.
