= Musée du Barreau de Paris =

Museum in Paris, France

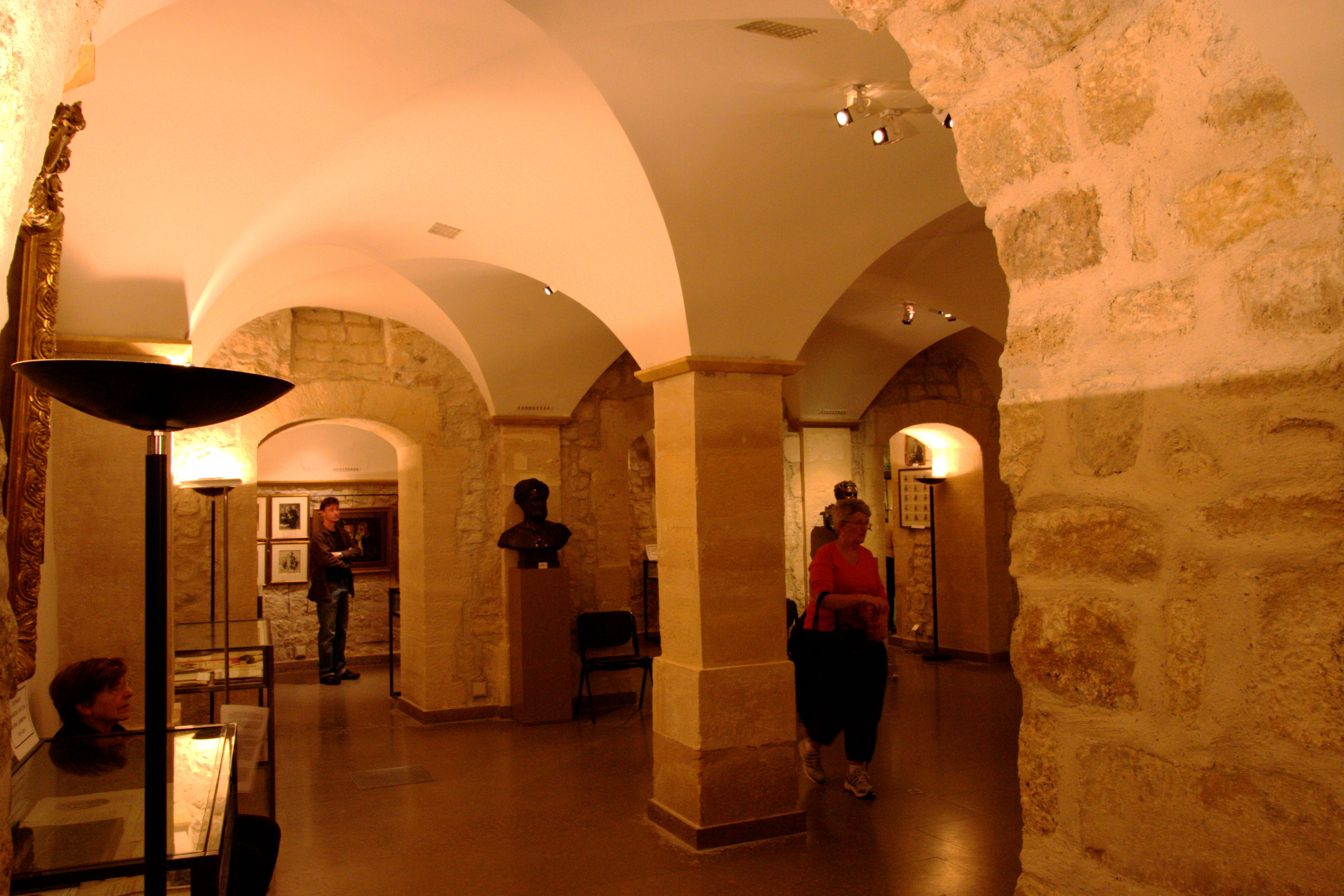
- Location: France
- Coordinates: 48°51′51″N 2°20′43″E
- Website: www.museedubarreaudeparis.com
- Location of Musée du Barreau de Paris

The Musée du Barreau de Paris (French pronunciation: [myze dy baʁo də paʁi]) is a French museum dedicated to the history of the Paris Bar and its lawyers. It is located close to the Église Saint-Eustache, in the 1st arrondissement of Paris, at 25 rue du Jour, Paris, and opens for groups, on appointment. A guided visit in English can be organised on request. An entrance fee is charged.

The museum occupies the vaulted cellars of the 17th century Hôtel de la Porte, named after its owner, Antoine de la Porte (1641-1697), fresh fish merchant and town magistrate of Paris, and restored in 1980-1981. Its collections include items that reflect legal history from the 17th century to the present (1960's), including manuscripts and exhibits from the trials of Louis XVI, Marie Antoinette, Émile Zola at the Dreyfus affair, Michel Ney, Pierre Cambronne, Raoul Villain(assassin of Jean Jaurès), and Alexandre Stavisky. It also has a fine collection of notes of oral arguments by lawyers including Claude François Chauveau-Lagarde (defender of Marie Antoinette), Fernand Labori (defender of Zola), Léon Gambetta, Raymond Poincaré, and Jacques Isorni (lawyer for Marshal Philippe Pétain). It contains numerous works of art related to the Paris Bar, including paintings, sculptures, prints, and photographs.

== See also ==
- List of museums in Paris
