= Gianantonio Capizucchi =

Italian Roman Catholic cardinal and bishop

Gianantonio Capizucchi (24 October 1515 – 28 January 1569) was an Italian Roman Catholic cardinal and bishop.

== Biography ==
Gianantonio Capizucchi was born in Rome on October 24, 1515. He was a doctor of both laws, and belonged to the noble Roman Capizucchi family.

On August 28, 1539, he became a canon of the cathedral chapter of St. Peter's Basilica. He became a Referendary of the Apostolic Signatura on June 1, 1549. He later served as an auditor at the Apostolic Palace.

Pope Paul IV made him a cardinal priest in the consistory of December 20, 1555. He received the red hat and the titular church of San Pancrazio on January 13, 1556.

On July 5, 1557, he was elected Bishop of Lodi. He was consecrated as a bishop in Rome on December 21, 1557 by Giovanni Giacomo Barba, Bishop of Terni.

He participated in the papal conclave of 1559 that elected Pope Pius IV. He opted for the titular church of Santa Croce in Gerusalemme on July 6, 1562, and then for San Clemente on November 7, 1565. He was a participant of the papal conclave of 1565-66 that elected Pope Pius V. Cardinal Capizucchi served as Camerlengo of the Sacred College of Cardinals from January 13, 1567 to January 14, 1568. On December 1, 1568, he became Prefect of the Apostolic Signatura. He also served as a member of the Holy Office.

He died in Rome on January 28, 1569. He was buried in his titular church.

== See also ==
- Catholic Church in Italy
