= Capizucchi family =

Noble Roman family

Coat of arms of the Capizucchi family
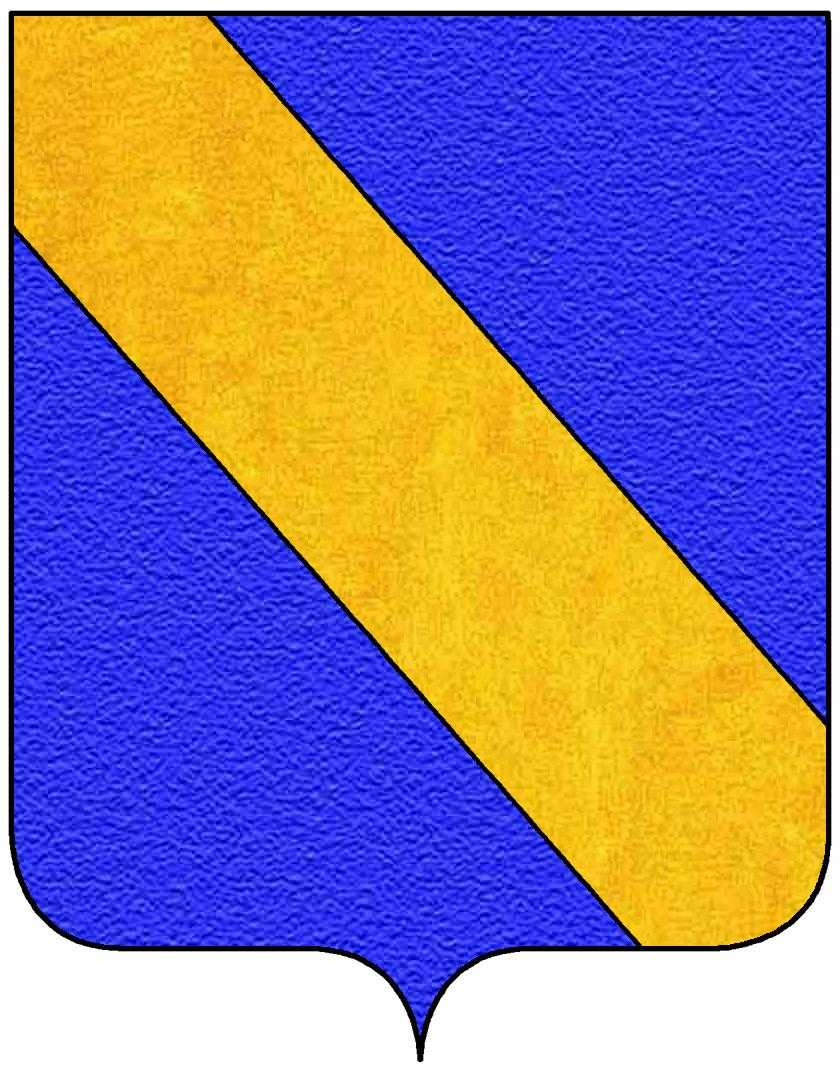
- Shield: azure, a bend or

The Capizucchi family was a noble Roman family. Considered one among the oldest families in Rome, it was deeply rooted in the Roman nobility because of the gallantry of many members. The family died out in the 17th century, and its name came to an end in 1813. The Capizucchis had their homes in Campitelli rione, at the foot of Capitoline Hill, and there also lay their palace. This still exists and is located between two squares, Piazza Campitelli and the one that took its name from the family, Piazza Capizucchi.

== History ==
Traditionally considered to be kindred to the counts of Thun, the family is considered to be among the oldest in Rome. However, the alleged existence of two Cardinals belonging to the family, named Roberto and Giovanni Roberto Capizucchi, who bore respectively the cardinal title of San Clemente al Monte Celio (in late eleventh century) and Santa Sabina (in early twelfth century), has to be considered a falsehood originated in 16th century.

A certain Jacobello Capizucchi, lord of Turris Candulphorum near the current Cecchina, was Conservatore (city counselor) of Rome in 1375. In 1341, from the family was chosen one of the twelve pages representing the Roman gentlemen who participated in the parade for the coronation of Francesco Petrarca on the Capitoline Hill. In 1390, as a bequest of a Coluccio de' Capizucchi, was given in giuspatronato to the family the chapel of San Paolo in the church of Santa Maria de Campitello, with the mortmain of the casale of San Ciriaco along the Via Ostiense.

Related to the main families of the Roman nobility at the beginning of the sixteenth century with Bruto and Marcello, the family reached the height of its fame as part of the Capitoline nobility thanks to the gallantry and the profession of arms, both deeply rooted among its members as Papirio, Cencio and Camillo. With Marcello's son Biagio, who – among others – participated to the battle of Lepanto on the orders of Marcantonio Colonna and could gain more than 100,000 scudi from his occupation as man-at-arms, the family reached the apogee of its wealth, buying the estates of Catino and Poggio Catino and building the palace which became its residence. This was perhaps designed before 1593 by Giacomo Della Porta, and had its main facade along Piazza Campitelli. In front of the palace lay the church of Santa Maria in Campitelli, where many of the Capizucchis are buried in the family's chapel, whose existence is attested since 1390.

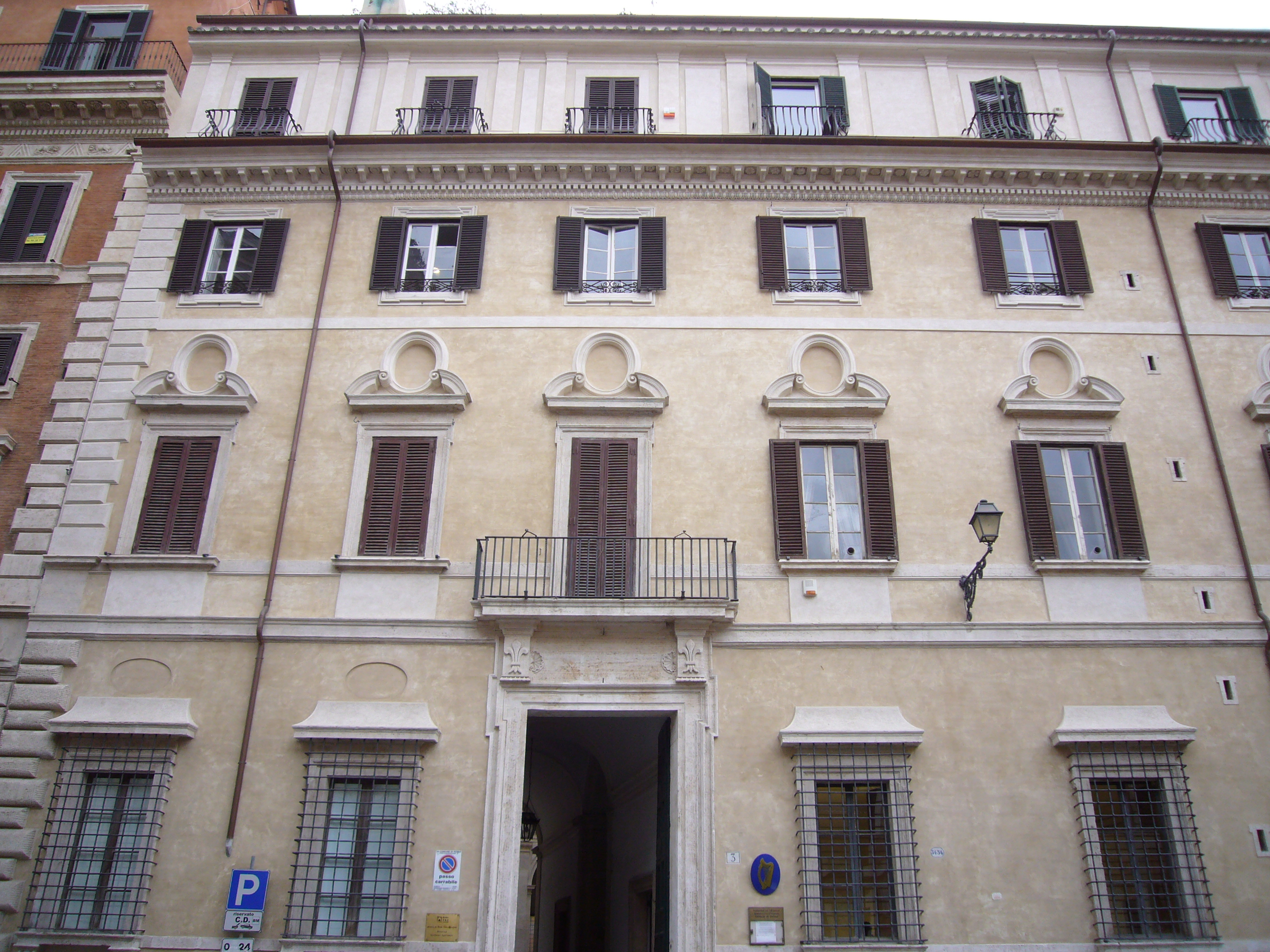
Façade of Palazzo Capizucchi along Piazza Campitelli in Rome

To the family belonged also the Cardinals Gianantonio and Raimondo who both, respectively, in the 16th and 17th centuries, served in the administration of the Holy See, reaching high positions.

The family, however, declined financially because of the passion for gambling of some of its members, who were forced to sell some of their fiefs. Moreover, it would have become extinct already in the seventeenth century, had not Francesco, the last exponent of the family, adopted his cousin Alessandro Marescotti. The latter accepted to use the surname Capizucchi "unmixed" and got the whole patrimony of the family, amounting to 150,000 scudi. The family became extinct definitively in 1813, with the death of Alessandro Capizucchi.

The Capizucchi were one of the sixty famiglie coscritte, which constituted the Roman patriciate, as defined in the Papal Bull Urbem Romam, issued in 1746 by pope Benedict XIV (r. 1740–58). At the apogee of their power, they owned the fiefs of Catino, Poggio Catino, Montieri and Fabro with title of marquess and were owners of various estates in the Roman Campagna, as the Cecchignola and Palidoro.

== Coat of arms ==
The Capizucchi's coat of arms was azure, a bend or (D'azzurro, alla banda d'oro).
