= William Pollard (Quaker) =

English Quaker writer and minister

William Pollard (1828–1893) was an English Quaker writer and recorded minister. He was a prominent advocate of quietist Quaker theology, during a period of theological dispute within the Society of Friends.

== Early life ==
Pollard was born at Horsham, Sussex, on 10 June 1828, the ninth child of James Pollard (1789–1851) and his wife, Susannah.

He became a junior teacher at the Friends' School, Croydon, in 1843, and in 1849 entered the Flounders Institute at Ackworth, Yorkshire, a Quaker college for training schoolmasters. He was appointed a master at the Quaker Ackworth School in 1851 and remained there for 16 years.

Pollard married Lucy Binns of Bishopwearmouth (now part of Sunderland) on 12 January 1854. They had ten children. Pollard issued several Quaker tracts while he was at Ackworth, including Primitive Christianity Revived and Congregational Worship. Ill-health obliged him to leave the teaching profession in 1866, but he was first mentioned as a recorded minister in the same year, when the family moved to Reigate.

== A Reasonable Faith ==
From 1866 to 1872, Pollard worked for the photographer Francis Frith. A proponent of liberal, quietist Quaker theology, he was a co-author with Frith and W. E. Turner of the influential book A Reasonable Faith, "by Three Friends" (1884 and 1886). This provoked outcry among the evangelically minded Quakers. In 1871 he published Considerations Addressed to the Society of Friends on the Peace Question, and in 1872 he became secretary and lecturer to the Lancashire and Cheshire International Arbitration Association, a branch of what would become the Peace Society. He held this post for most of the rest of his life.

== Retirement ==
Around 1872, Pollard and his family moved to Sale, Cheshire. He died on 26 September 1893 at his home, Drayton Lodge, Eccles, Lancashire, and was buried in the Quaker cemetery at Ashton-on-Mersey. He was survived by his wife, five sons and three daughters.
