= Quietism (Christian contemplation) =

17th-century ideas heretical to Catholics

Quietism is the name given (especially in Catholic theology) to a set of contemplative practices that rose in popularity in France, Italy, and Spain during the late 1670s and 1680s, particularly associated with the writings of the Spanish mystic Miguel de Molinos (and subsequently François Malaval and Madame Guyon), and which were condemned as heresy by Pope Innocent XI in the papal bull Coelestis Pastor of 1687. Quietism was seen by critics as holding that man's highest perfection consists in a sort of psychical self-annihilation and a consequent absorption of the soul into the Divine Essence even during the present life.

== Usage ==
Since the late seventeenth century, Quietism has functioned (especially within Catholic theology, though also to an extent within Protestant theology), as the shorthand for accounts which are perceived to fall foul of the same theological errors, and thus to be heretical. As such, the term has come to be applied to beliefs far outside its original context. The term quietism was not used until the 17th century, so some writers have dubbed the expression of such errors before this era as "pre-quietism".

Ronald Knox, in his study of heterodox Christian movements, including Quietism, points out, however, that Quietism is less a heresy or school of thought than a "tendency," a "direction of the human mind" to exaggerate concepts that otherwise could be considered perfectly orthodox. He suggests that it is misleading to speak of a Quietist School, if by this we mean a well thought-out set of beliefs that all members of a supposed Quietist heresy professed. Quietism, he maintains, is not a neat set of "conclusions." Rather, he asserts, Quietism, as it manifested itself in seventeenth-century Europe, ran the spectrum from almost completely orthodox teaching to extremely heterodox beliefs. "You can," he concludes, "be more or less of a Quietist." One, therefore, should always bear in mind that many differences in style and emphasis (and in some cases even in rather essential beliefs) exist among the various mystics labeled Quietist. As Knox has shown, the teachings of Molinos are not necessarily synonymous with those of La Combe or Guyon, much less those of Fénelon.

Although both Molinos and other authors condemned in the late seventeenth century, as well as their opponents, spoke of the Quietists (in other words, those who were devoted to the "prayer of quiet", an expression used by Teresa of Avila, John of the Cross and others), "Quietism" was a creation of its opponents, a somewhat artificial systematisation made on the basis of ecclesiastical condemnations and commentary upon them. No single author – even Molinos, generally seen as the main representative of Quietist thought – advocated all the positions that formed the Quietism of later Catholic doctrinal textbooks; as such, at least one author suggests that it is better to speak of a Quietist tendency or orientation, one which may be located in analogous forms through Christian history.

== The Quietist controversy of the 1670s and 1680s ==
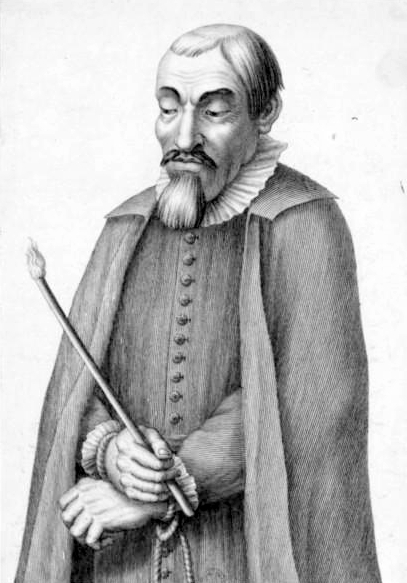
Miguel de Molinos

Quietism is particularly associated with the writings of Miguel de Molinos. He published the Spiritual Guide in 1675. Molinos recommended absolute passivity and contemplation in total repose of the spirit. He was aware of the focus in the writings of Ignatius of Loyola on meditation, and the likelihood that Jesuit writers would react poorly to any perceived attack on Ignatius’s thought. He said the meditation was an important stage of the spiritual life, but that it was well-established that in order to pass to the state of contemplation one must leave behind meditative practices.

The doctrines of quietism were finally condemned by Pope Innocent XI in the papal bull of 1687 entitled Coelestis Pastor. However, theologian Bernard McGinn says that the particular errors condemned in the bull are not in the Spiritual Guide. Molinos' work was marked by imprecision and ambiguities that left it subject to unintended interpretations.

== Quietism in France ==
From Molinos' teaching developed a less radical form known as Semiquietism, whose principle advocates were François Fénelon and Madame Guyon. Quietism spread among Catholics through small groups into France. The most noted representative was Madame Guyon, especially with her work A Short and Easy Method of Prayer, who claimed not to have known the teaching of Molinos directly, but certainly did have contact with François Malaval, a proponent of Molinos.

Madame Guyon won an influential convert at the court of Louis XIV in Madame de Maintenon, and influenced the circle of devout Catholics in the court for a time. She was also a spiritual counsellor to François Fénelon, Archbishop of Cambrai. A commission in France found most of Madame Guyon's works intolerable and the government confined her, first in a convent, then in the Bastille, leading eventually to her exile to Blois in 1703.

In 1699, after Fénelon's spirited defense in a press war with Bossuet, Pope Innocent XII prohibited the circulation of Fénelon's Maxims of the Saints, to which Fénelon submitted at once. The Inquisition's proceedings against remaining quietists in Italy lasted until the eighteenth century. Jean Pierre de Caussade, the Jesuit and author of the spiritual treatise Abandonment to Divine Providence, was forced to withdraw for two years (1731–1733) from his position as spiritual director to a community of nuns after he was suspected of Quietism (a charge of which he was acquitted).

== Similar concepts ==
Apatheia to the Stoics meant "equanimity", the characteristic of the sage. The Stoics thought that living virtuously provided freedom from the passions, resulting in apatheia.

In the Eastern Orthodox Church, an analogous dispute might be located in Hesychasm in which "the supreme aim of life on earth is the contemplation of the uncreated light whereby man is intimately united with God". However, according to Bishop Kallistos Ware, "The distinctive tenets of the 17th-century Western Quietists are not characteristic of Greek hesychasm."

In early Christianity, suspicion over forms of mystical teaching may be seen as controversies over Gnosticism in the second and third centuries, and over the Messalian heresy in the fourth and fifth centuries.

Likewise, the twelfth and thirteenth-century Brethren of the Free Spirit, Beguines and Beghards were all accused of holding beliefs with similarities to those condemned in the Quietist controversy. Among the ideas seen as errors and condemned by the Council of Vienne (1311–12) are the propositions that humankind in the present life can attain such a degree of perfection as to become utterly sinless; that the "perfect" have no need to fast or pray, but may freely grant the body whatsoever it craves.

The Cathars' denial of the need for sacerdotal rites has been perceived as a form of quietism. This may be a tacit reference to the Cathars or Albigenses of southern France and Catalonia, and that they are not subject to any human authority or bound by the precepts of the Church. Similar assertions of individual autonomy on the part of the Fraticelli led to their condemnation by Pope John XXII in 1317. Alternatively, it is likely to be a direct reference to the so-called Beguine, Margaret Porete, burned alive at the stake in Paris in 1310 formally as a relapsed heretic, but also on account of her work "The Mirror of Simple Souls", written, importantly, in the French vernacular. Margaret is truly unique in her thought, but that the perfected soul becomes free of virtue and of its obligations and of those of the church she states clearly in her work, which is a theme throughout.

The condemnation of the ideas of Meister Eckhart in 1329 may also be seen as an instance of an analogous concern in Christian history. Eckhart's assertions that we are totally transformed into God just as in the sacrament the bread is changed into the body of Christ (see transubstantiation) and the value of internal actions, which are wrought by the Godhead abiding within us, have often been linked to later Quietist heresies.

In early sixteenth-century Spain, concern over a set of beliefs held by those known as alumbrados raised similar concerns to those of Quietism. These concerns continued into the mid-sixteenth century and in the writings of Teresa of Avila and John of the Cross. Both were very active reformers and cautioned against a simple-minded "don't think anything" (no pensar nada) approach to meditation and contemplation; further, both acknowledged the authority of the Catholic Church and did not oppose its teaching concerning contemplative prayer. Thus, their work was not condemned as heresy, being consistent with Church teaching. This did not stop John's work, however, coming under suspicion after his death; the fact he was not canonised until 1726 is largely due to seventeenth-century suspicions of beliefs similar to those termed "Quietist" later in the century.

George Fox came to the conclusion that the only real spirituality was achieved by paying attention to the Holy Spirit (the Godhead) through silence, and founded the Quaker movement on this basis – one which shared much resemblance with "Quietist" thought. Quietist thinking was also influential among the British Quakers of the later 19th century, when the tract A Reasonable Faith, by Three Friends (William Pollard, Francis Frith and W. E. Turner (1884 and 1886)) caused sharp controversy with evangelicals in the society.

The Capuchin friar Benet Canfield (1562–1611), an English Catholic living in Belgium, espoused quietism in a tract called Way of Perfection, on deep prayer and meditation.

== See also ==
- Ataraxia
- Hesychasm
- Johannes Kelpius
- Religious Society of Friends (Quakers)
- Taoism
- Zen Buddhism
- Nondualism
- Pietism (Pietistic Lutheranism)
