= Guillaume Alexandre Tronson du Coudray =

French lawyer (1750–1798)

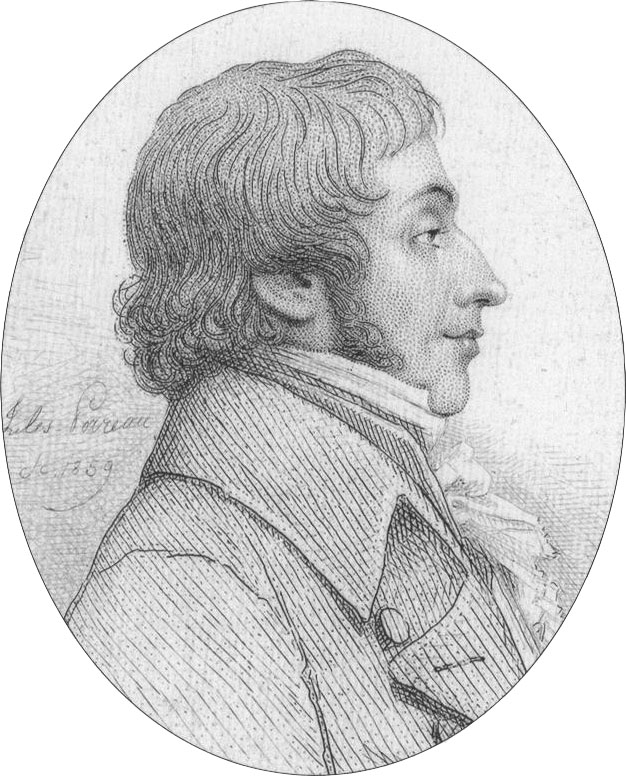
- Born: 18 November 1750; Reims, Kingdom of France
- Died: 27 May 1798 (aged 47); Sinnamary, French Guiana
- Occupation: Lawyer
- Known for: Defending Marie Antoinette during her trial in 1793

Guillaume Alexandre Tronson du Coudray (18 November 1750 – 27 May 1798) was a French lawyer who defended the former Queen Marie Antoinette at her trial during the French Revolution. He later served as a member of the Council of Ancients. After the coup of 18 Fructidor, he was arrested and deported to Sinnamary.

== Early life ==
Guillaume Alexandre Tronson du Coudray was born in Reims to a minor noble family. He had 9 siblings, one of whom was Philippe Charles Tronson du Coudray. He became an advocate in 1778 when he was 28 years old.

== Trials of Louis XVI and Marie Antoinette ==
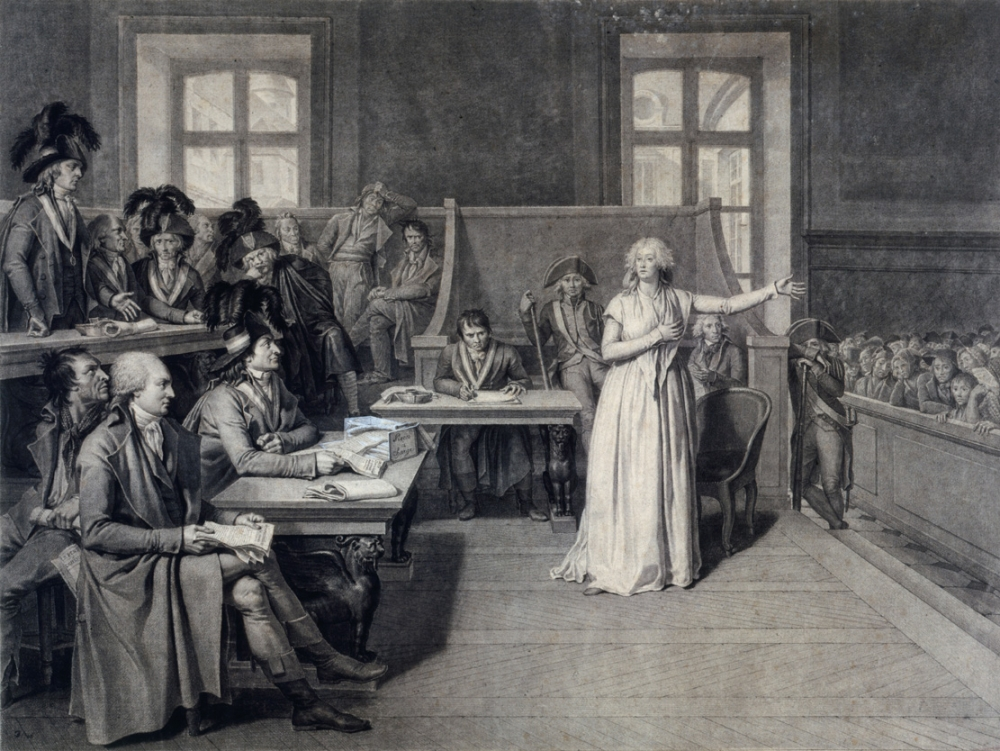
Trial of Marie Antoinette by Pierre Bouillon

In 1792, Tronson du Coudray petitioned the National Convention to defend the deposed King Louis XVI at his trial. When the Convention denied his request, he "published his offer in every newspaper that dared to print it", writing that it was his duty to defend the former king, despite the risk. Louis was ultimately found guilty of treason and condemned to death on 19 January 1793, after a majority of the members of the Convention rejected an appeal for a stay of execution. He was executed by guillotine two days later, on 21 January 1793.

On 12 October 1793, Tronson du Coudray and Chauveau-Lagarde were assigned to defend Louis XVI's widow, Marie Antoinette, after she indicated to the Revolutionary Tribunal that she did not know any lawyers. Her trial began the following Monday, on 14 October. Her charges included collaborating with France's enemies and grossly mismanaging France's finances for her own pleasures. Jacques Hébert also accused her of incestuous acts with her young son Louis XVII. After over a day of witness testimony, Tronson du Coudray and Chauveau-Legarde were each given two hours to speak in her defense. Most expected that the former queen would be banished, but she was found guilty on all charges and sentenced to death on 16 October 1793.

After Marie Antoinette's trial, Tronson du Coudray was denounced and briefly detained. He was released by decree of the Convention.

== Later life and death ==
In 1795, Tronson du Coudray was appointed to the Council of Ancients for Seine-et-Oise. He was arrested after the coup of 18 Fructidor in September 1797 and deported to Sinnamary in French Guiana. He died on 27 May 1798.
