= Miguel de Molinos =

Spanish mystic (1628–1696)

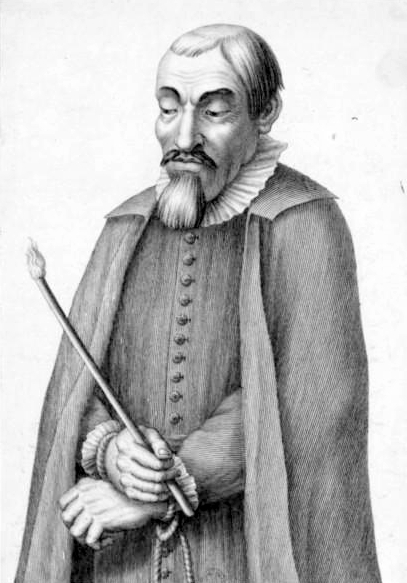
Miguel de Molinos

Miguel de Molinos (baptised 29 June 1628 – 29 December 1696) was a Spanish Catholic mystic and the chief representative of the Church-condemned religious movement known as Quietism.

== Biography ==
He was born in 1628 near Muniesa (Teruel), in Aragon, a village around 100 kilometres (60 miles) south of Zaragoza. His birthdate is unknown, but church records indicate he was baptised on 29 June 1628. He moved to Valencia in his youth and undertook religious education with the Jesuits there at the College of St Paul. He was ordained in 1652, and seemingly took his doctorate shortly thereafter at Coimbra. He held a benefice in the church of Santo Tomas and was confessor to a community of nuns.

On 4 June 1662, Molinos was admitted to the local chapter of the School of Christ, a religious brotherhood that would play an important role in his later life in Rome. He seems in these early years in Valencia to have held a number of secondary roles in the chapter's leadership, at least one of which earned him a place on the chapter's governing body.

In July 1663, Molinos was chosen to travel to Rome as procurator of the cause of the beatification of the Venerable Francisco Jerónimo Simón (d. 1612), a secular cleric and beneficer of the parish of St Andrews in Valencia. He left Spain in late 1663; he would not return.

There is almost no specific evidence of Molinos's activities in Rome in 1663–1675. It is known that Molinos was affiliated with the Roman chapter of the School of Christ (and, by 1671 at the latest, had become its leader). He also became well known as a spiritual director – and it was in this role that he gained prominence as the leading advocate of the teaching and practice that would come to be known as Quietism. He was a regular correspondent with Princess Borghese, and counted as an admirer, Cardinal Benedetto Odescalchi, who in 1676 became Pope Innocent XI. He also paid frequent visits to the house of the exiled Christina, Queen of Sweden. He was also in these years working on the case of the Venerable Simón; by 1675, however, Molinos had to admit to his superiors in Valencia that the Congregation of Rites had refused to reconsider the case. Molinos's royal commission and line of credit were revoked, and he was deprived of his official position in the Valencian delegation in Rome.

In the same year, 1675, Molinos published his most famous work, the Spiritual Guide. The initial Spanish edition was quickly followed by an Italian translation entitled Guida spirituale, che disinvolge l'anima e la conduce per l'interior camino all' acquisito della perfetta contemplazione e del ricco tesoro della pace interiore (Spiritual Guide, which releases the soul and conducts it through the interior path to acquire the perfect contemplation and rich treasure of interior peace). The work was published with the usual approval from the ecclesiastical authorities – the book received the imprimatur from the Dominican Raimondo Capizucchi, the pope's own theologian, and the book opened with approbations by clergy of the Trinitarian, Franciscan, Carmelite, Capuchin and Jesuit orders. This was followed soon after in 1675 by a brief Trattato della cotidiana communione (Brief Treatise on Daily Communion), in which Molinos argued that those who wished to receive the Eucharist daily should not be denied by their confessor, so long as they were in a state of grace. Again, this work was approved by the censors of several orders.

== Quietist controversy ==
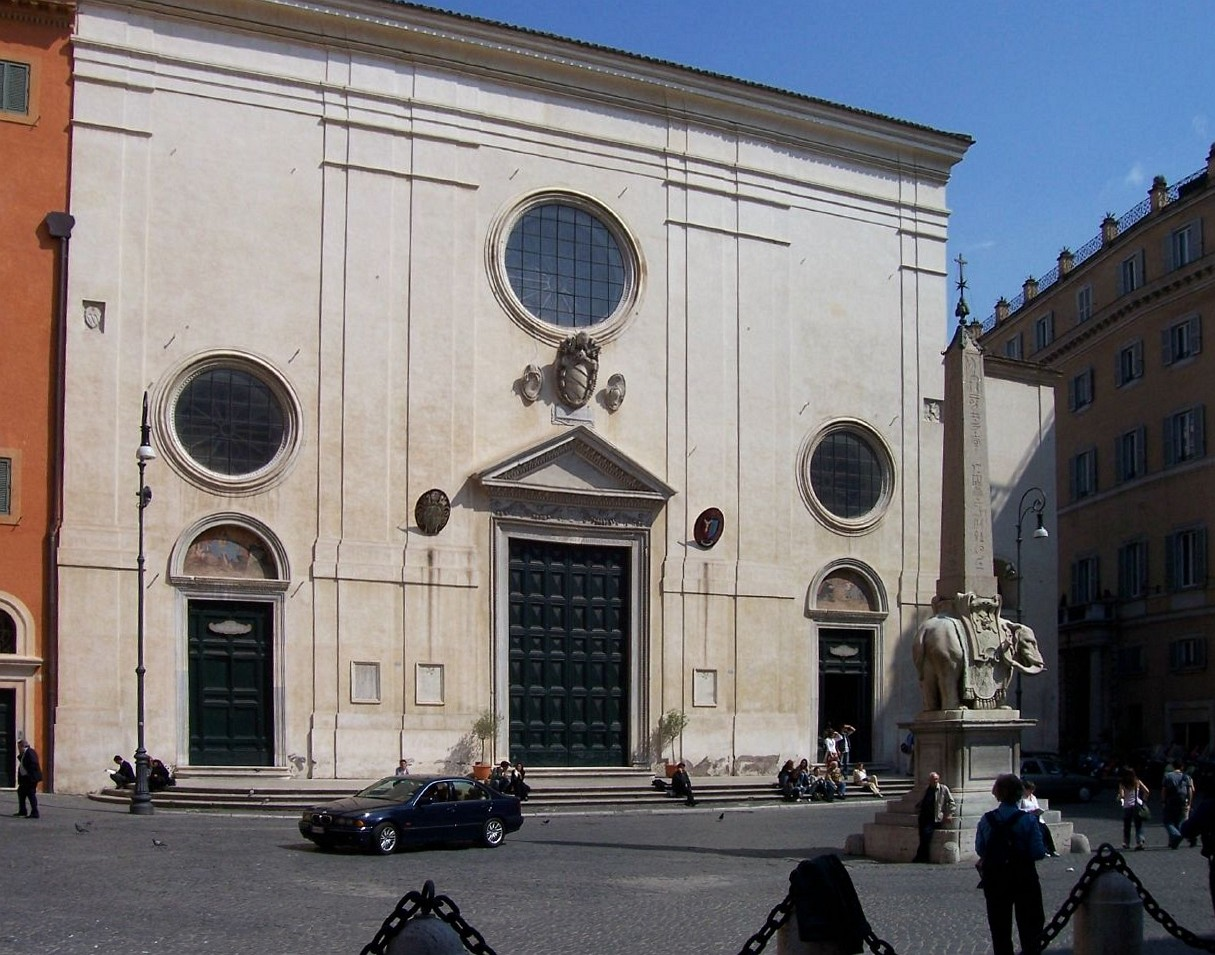
Santa Maria sopra Minerva in Rome, the church in which Molinos was condemned in 1687.

According to Daniel-Rops, Molinos recommended absolute passivity and contemplation in total repose of the spirit. Activity disrupts passive receptivity, therefore, even devotions are harmful, as they focus on something sensible, such as the Humanity of Christ. God allows sin in order to discipline and purify the soul, so it was wrong to resist temptation. Molinos's writings were extremely popular. By 1685 seven editions had been printed in Italy and three in Spain. Translations of the book were made into Latin (1687), French (1688), Dutch (1688), English (1688), and German (1699).

His ideas might have been condemned sooner but for the esteem in which he was held by Innocent XI, Capizucchi, and some influential cardinals. Inigo Caracciolo, Archbishop of Naples, said that in convents of religious women, sisters rejected vocal prayer in preference to the prayer of quiet. Cardinal Albizzi of the Holy Office, also took a dim view. Rumors spread throughout Rome denouncing Molinos' alleged conduct with his female penitents.

The first attack on Molinos's Guide (though without specifically mentioning the Guide or Molinos) appeared in 1678, written by Gottardo Bell’huomo. Molinos evidently felt that Bell’huomo's book could not be ignored, because shortly after he wrote (though never published) an apologia for his Guide entitled Defence of Contemplation, aiming to defend the Guide against charges of theological innovation. Specifically, he marshalled a long list of past writers and saints (including Francisco Suarez and Jean-Joseph Surin) in order to demonstrate that the Guide’s principal thesis – that in order to pass to the state of contemplation one must leave behind meditative practices was a well-established part of church doctrine. (He was aware of the focus in the writings of Ignatius of Loyola on meditation, and the likelihood that Jesuit writers would react poorly to any perceived attack on Ignatius’s thought. He was quick to emphasise that these are certainly an important stage of the spiritual life.) Instead of publishing the book, Molinos took up his case with the superior general of the Jesuits, Giovanni Paolo Oliva. In a series of letters from February 1680 onwards, Molinos sought to assure Oliva that he had nothing but praise and respect for the Jesuits and their spirituality.

A second moment of suspicion against Molinos arose in 1681. In March 1680, the Jesuit preacher Paolo Segneri, a renowned doctor of ascetical theology, wrote to Oliva, proposing a book defending meditation against the Quietists’ teaching. Oliva encouraged him and forwarded copies of the letters he had recently sent to Molinos. Later in 1680, a book was published in Florence, titled Concordia tra la fatica e la quiete nell' orazione (Agreement Between Effort and Quiet in Prayer), with Oliva's name signed as imprimatur. The book attacked Molinos's views, though without mentioning his name.

During 1680–1681, a series of responses appeared from both the Quietists and the Jesuits. The matter was referred to the Inquisition. In late 1681, it pronounced that the Guida spirituale was perfectly orthodox, censured Segneri, and placed his book on the Index (later in 1681, Bellhuomo's work was also placed on the Index).

The apparent Quietist victory, however, was short-lived. Cardinal d'Estrées, French ambassador at Rome, acting on instructions from Paris, denounced him to the authorities. On 18 July 1685, Molinos was arrested by the pontifical guards and imprisoned in the Castel Sant’Angelo. At first his friends were confident of an acquittal, and it seems that many in Rome remained sympathetic to his beliefs, but matters gradually turned against him.

In spring 1687, Molinos was brought before a tribunal of the Holy Office of the Inquisition and asked to explain his teaching, with 263 questionable propositions from his works at stake. Although initially defending them, by May 1687 his attitude had changed and he confessed his errors of conduct and teaching and waived his opportunity to present a defence. By July, the tribunal had isolated 68 objectionable propositions and had prepared articles of censure for each.

On 23 August 1687, the entire case was read to the cardinal inquisitors, and on 2 September Molinos's sentence (life in prison) was announced.

On 3 September Molinos made a public profession of his errors in the Dominican Church of Santa Maria sopra Minerva. On 20 November Pope Innocent XI ratified his condemnation of the practices of the Quietists in the bull Coelestis Pastor, condemning 68 propositions from the Guida spirituale and other unpublished writings of its author.

Molinos died nine years later in the prison of the Holy Office on 29 December 1696.

== Later reputation ==
For the last three centuries, Molinos has chiefly been known as the main proponent of the most fundamental mystical heresy in Catholicism, a heresy which has come to be the touchstone for doctrinal judgements about correct and incorrect claims for mystical contact with God. Most assessments of him have been accordingly negative.

In the second half of the twentieth century, however, the assessment of Eulogio Pacho has been somewhat more circumspect, aware of the problematic bias in the various sources on Molinos. Bernard McGinn is not entirely forgiving of Molinos as a person, finding likely that he did engage in sexual misconduct with some of his penitents during his work as a spiritual director. McGinn, however, pointed out how far the errors condemned in the bull Coelestis Pastor do not in fact exist in the Spiritual Guide. Rather, he argues, the imprecision and lack of qualifications in Molinos's work left him open to attack, and this was exacerbated by the fact that his book (with its various ambiguities) focused on certain issues (notably contemplation over meditation, interior quiet over vocal prayer, and passivity over pious action) which had become heated debates in the preceding century. Even today we do not know if the rumors of sexual misconduct were even made at his trial as the text of the record and the trial have yet to be released by the Vatican. His last words to a priest before entering his cell of imprisonment were: "Good-by, Father. We shall meet again on the day of judgement. Then it will be seen if the truth was on your side or mine."

Henry Longfellow wrote a sonnet about him. William James, in The Varieties of Religious Experience said he was a 'spiritual genius'.

== See also ==
- Inquisition
- Quietism (Christian philosophy)
