= Claude François Chauveau-Lagarde =

French lawyer (1756–1841)

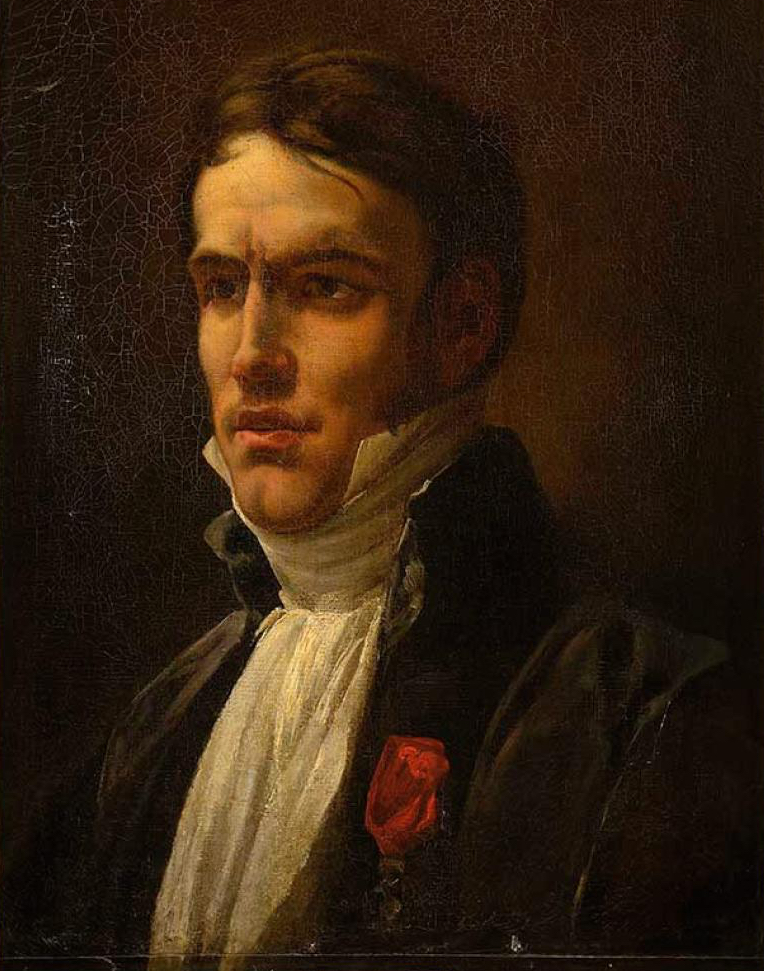
- Portrait of Claude François Chauveau-Lagarde by Césarine Davin-Mirvault, early 19th century (Musée du Barreau de Paris)
- Born: Claude François Chauveau-Lagarde; 1756; Chartres, France
- Died: 1841 (aged 84–85); Paris, France

Claude François Chauveau-Lagarde (French pronunciation: [klod fʁɑ̃swa ʃovo laɡaʁd]; 1756–1841) was a French lawyer who came into the public spotlight in the early stages of the French Revolution. He defended many notable cases during the Reign of Terror, including that of Marie Antoinette.

== Life ==
Chauveau-Lagarde was already a respected lawyer in Paris when the Estates General of 1789 were convoked. He published a hopeful Théorie des états généraux ou la France régénérée. Under the Revolution he continued to exercise his profession, now as défenseur officieux (a public defender). His name appears in the lists of civil trials in the collection of Aristide Douarche. On 16 May 1793 he defended the Venezuelan general Francisco de Miranda before the revolutionary tribunal, whilst it still represented a spirit of goodwill towards the accused; thanks to his effective plea, Miranda was acquitted. However, Jean-Paul Marat denounced Chauveau-Lagarde as a liberator of the guilty.

Chauveau-Lagarde distinguished himself by his moral courage under the Reign of Terror, where he defended moderate Girondins such as Jacques Pierre Brissot, his fellow countryman from Chartres. He also defended Louis-Marie-Florent, duc du Châtelet; Jean-Sylvain Bailly; Madame Roland; Geneviève de Brunelle and Charlotte Corday, who had assassinated Marat. All of these previously named clients were executed in 1793. Madame Roland applied to him to prepare her defense, which she intended to present herself before her judges. In Corday's case, Chauveau-Lagarde knew that the judgment had been decided in advance, and limited himself to pleading in her defense "the exaltation of political fanaticism" that had placed the knife in her hand.

He took on the 1793 defense of Marie Antoinette so zealously that the Comité de sûreté générale became suspicious; once sentence had been pronounced on the Queen, he was summoned before the committee and accused of having defended her all too well; but he managed to justify his actions.

In 1794 he took on the defense of Madame Elisabeth, sister of the King, without being permitted to interview his client. Other notable cases included defending a group of women accused of having welcomed the invading King of Prussia with sugared almonds. Twelve of the group were subsequently executed in 1794, and inspired Victor Hugo's poem "The Virgins of Verdun". He also defended the twenty-seven defendants from Tonnerre.

Following the passage of the Draconian law of 22 prairial an II (10 June 1794), which suppressed the role of lawyers for the defense of those accused before the tribunals, he withdrew to his native city. There he was arrested, accused of demonstrating too much leniency towards counter-revolutionaries. His arrest warrant specified his appearance before the Revolutionary Tribunal in three days, but he remained discreetly in detention for six weeks, which saved him from the guillotine. After the Thermidorian Reaction (27 July 1794) he was set at liberty.

His cosectionnaires (fellow section members) elected him president of the section ("l'Unité"), the most royalist neighborhood of Paris. Compromised by the royalist insurrection of 13 Vendémiaire (5 October 1795), he was condemned to death for contumacy. He remained in hiding, awaiting the return of calm. When he did finally appear, his sentence was annulled.

With the return of public order under the Directory (2 November 1795-9 November 1799) he resumed his profession. In 1797 he was charged with the defense of Abbé Charles Brottier, for whom he won acquittal, as he did for several royalists accused of conspiracy. He obtained acquittals for the abductors of Clément Ris, for Jean-Baptiste Jourdan, for General Dupont, with his customary courage and eloquence.

After the Bourbon Restoration, he became avocat au Conseil du roi and president of the Conseil de l’ordre des avocats and was named councillor of the Court of Cassation (1828).

He is commemorated in the Chauveau-Lagarde street, Paris. He is buried in Montparnasse Cemetery, Paris.
