= Philippe Charles Tronson du Coudray =

French army officer

Philippe Charles Jean Baptiste Tronson du Coudray (September 8, 1738 – September 11, 1777) was a French army officer who volunteered for service in the Continental Army during the American Revolutionary War.

== Early life ==
Born in Reims, France, du Coudray entered the French military and trained as an artillery specialist. Well connected to the French court (he once tutored the future Charles X on military affairs), du Coudray was a leading proponent of the Gribeauval system of artillery in the Seven Years' War.

== American Revolution ==
By 1775, du Coudray had risen to the rank of chef de brigade, with a posting as an adjutant general. He was a leading figure in the French artillery and had written treatises on subjects such as gunpowder and metallurgy as it applied to the artillery.

In 1776, the American diplomat Silas Deane came to France to recruit skilled military talent, particularly engineers, for the colonial cause. Impressed by du Coudray, whom he described as the "first engineer" of the French military establishment, Deane agreed to hire du Coudray into the Continental Army with the rank of major general and command of the Continental Army's artillery and engineering corps. Du Coudray was to recruit engineers in France, and deliver 200 French cannons to the American forces. The methods by which du Coudray went about recruiting alarmed the French court, which wanted to maintain secrecy in its dealings with the Americans, and du Coudray was ordered to stay in France. He ignored the order, slipped out of France, and arrived in North America in May 1777.

Deane in fact exceeded his authority in extending the offer to du Coudray, but the Continental Congress felt obliged to honor it, and he was commissioned with the offered rank. A number of American generals were outraged that high ranks were awarded to foreigners, and the Continental Army's artillery chief, Henry Knox, was particularly incensed that du Coudray would outrank him. To placate Knox, who threatened to resign over the matter, and to resolve conflicts of command and personality issues between du Coudray and another French engineer, Louis Lebègue Duportail, du Coudray was not assigned to a command position, and was instead appointed as "Inspector General of Ordnance and Military Manufactories" in August 1777.

Du Coudray was somewhat unpopular because of the circumstances surrounding his commissioning, although they were not directly of his making. His superior attitude and aristocratic demeanor did nothing to improve relations with others. He was at first assigned to survey the defenses around Philadelphia and recommend improvements. His initial report on the matter suggested developing Red Bank (the site of Fort Mercer) and recommended significant changes to Fort Billingsport, while completely dismissing Fort Mifflin. General George Washington took an active role in the distribution of the defenses, and chose Fort Mifflin as the primary point of defense in opposition to du Coudray's suggestion. Du Coudray, in a politically-astute maneuver, backed down from his assessment, and was given the assignment of working at Fort Mifflin. He continued to lobby Congress on the matter, however, with the result that improvements to all of the forts was slow.

== Death ==
On September 11, 1777, as Du Coudray rode onto a ferry to cross the Schuylkill River, his horse became alarmed and leapt into the river. Du Coudray was warned by the ferryman that horses often get spooked on ferries, but Du Coudray insisted that French officers do not take orders from ferrymen. Consequently, Du Coudray was entangled in his stirrups and drowned with the horse. His body was pulled from the river later that day. His funeral, held at St. Mary's Church, in Philadelphia, was attended by many Congressional representatives. He was buried in the church yard, but the "exact grave location" is unknown.

== Sources ==
- Alder, Ken. Engineering the Revolution: Arms and Enlightenment in France, 1763-1815. Chicago: University of Chicago Press, 2010. ISBN 978-0-226-01264-3
- Allison, Robert J. The American Revolution. Oxford University Press
- Purcell, L. Edward. Who Was Who in the American Revolution. New York: Facts on File, 1993. ISBN 0-8160-2107-4.
- “The Continental Congress at Mass—Two te Deums and Two Requiems: Washington at a Catholic Burial Service.” The American Catholic Historical Researches 6, no. 2 (1889): 50–55. http://www.jstor.org/stable/44373622.
- Walker, Paul. Engineers of Independence. Honolulu: The Minerva Group, 2002. ISBN 978-1-4102-0173-7.
- Woodward, William. Lafayette. Farrar & Rinehart, Inc., 1938.
