= French School of Spirituality =

Devotional influence of the Catholic church

The French school of spirituality was the principal devotional influence within the Catholic Church from the mid-17th century through the mid-20th century, not only in France but throughout the Church in most of the world. A development of the Catholic Reformation like the Spanish mystics and the Society of Jesus, it focused the devotional life of the Catholic faithful on a personal experience of the person of Jesus and the quest for personal holiness. It was perhaps more concrete than the Iberian example and thus easier to teach, but it shared with the Spanish saints their focus on the divine person. This movement in Catholic spirituality had many important figures over the centuries, the first being its founder, Cardinal Pierre de Bérulle (1575–1629), along with St. Francis de Sales, who in 1877 was declared a Doctor of the Church.

== Disciples of Berulle ==
One of Berulle's disciples, Jean-Jacques Olier went on to found the Sulpician Order to run seminaries and train future priests in France, Canada and the United States, thus spreading the French school's influence to North America where it would dominate for the next three centuries. Olier's particular strain of the French school's thinking at its most pessimistic is captured in this quote from Olier's Journée chrétienne, (Part 1):

It is necessary for the soul to be in fear and distrust of self; ... It should make its pleasure and joy depend on sacrificing to Jesus all joy and pleasure which it may have apart from himself. And when taking part in those things in which by Providence it is obliged to be occupied, such as eating, drinking, and conversation with creatures, it must be sparing in all, must discard what is superfluous, and must renounce, in the use of them, the joy and pleasure to be found therein, uniting and giving itself to Jesus as often as it feels itself tempted to enjoy something apart from him and not himself.

Another disciple of Berulle's was Jeanne Chezard de Matel who went on to found the Order of the Incarnate Word and Blessed Sacrament in Avignon, France. The express purpose of these cloistered women was to give adoration to Christ incarnate, making liturgy a matter of worshiping God in awe and mystery and through their presence make "an extension of the admirable Incarnation".

It was through Berulle that Vincent de Paul became chaplain to the influential Gondi family, through whom de Paul met a host of important people in high society and the Church.

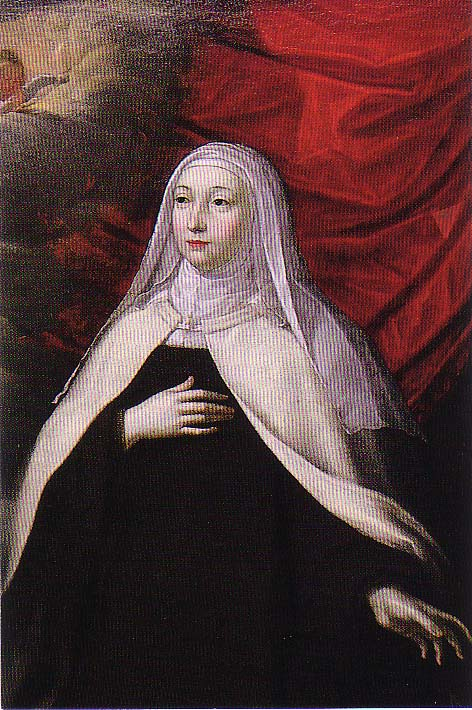
Madame Acarie

== Devotional developments ==
The devotional axes of the French school were:

- Exaltation of Christ by the faithful and the movement of the will to make oneself Christ's humble servant.
- Meditation and imitation of the sentiments found in scripture of Christ and Mary
- Adoration of the Blessed Sacrament
- Devotion to the Sacred Heart of Jesus and the Immaculate Heart of Mary through chaplets (particular rosary-type prayers) and litanies.

== Important figures in the movement ==
- Cardinal Pierre de Bérulle (1575–1629), founder of the Oratory of Jesus in 1611
- Charles de Condren (1588–1641), successor of Bérulle as Superior General of the Oratory
- St. Francis de Sales
- St. John Eudes, founder of the Congregation of Jesus and Mary
- St. Margaret Mary Alacoque, promoter of devotion to the Sacred Heart of Jesus
- Henri Boudon
- Jean-Jacques Olier, (1608–1657), founded the Society of St. Sulpice, in 1642, to train and form future priests
- Jeanne Chezard de Matel (1596–1670), foundress of the Sisters of the Incarnate Word and Blessed Sacrament in Avignon, France, in December, 1639
- St. Louis de Montfort
- Baron de Renty
- Madame Acarie
- Jérôme le Royer de la Dauversière

== Religious communities founded in the French school tradition ==
- Congregation of Holy Cross
- Oratory of Jesus
- Assumptionists
- Society of the Priests of Saint Sulpice
- Fathers of Mercy (Missionaries of France)
- Society of Mary

== See also ==
- Touraine Reform
