= Montée du Gourguillon =

Street in Lyon, France

Coordinates: 45°45′31″N 4°49′29″E

Montée du Gourgillon
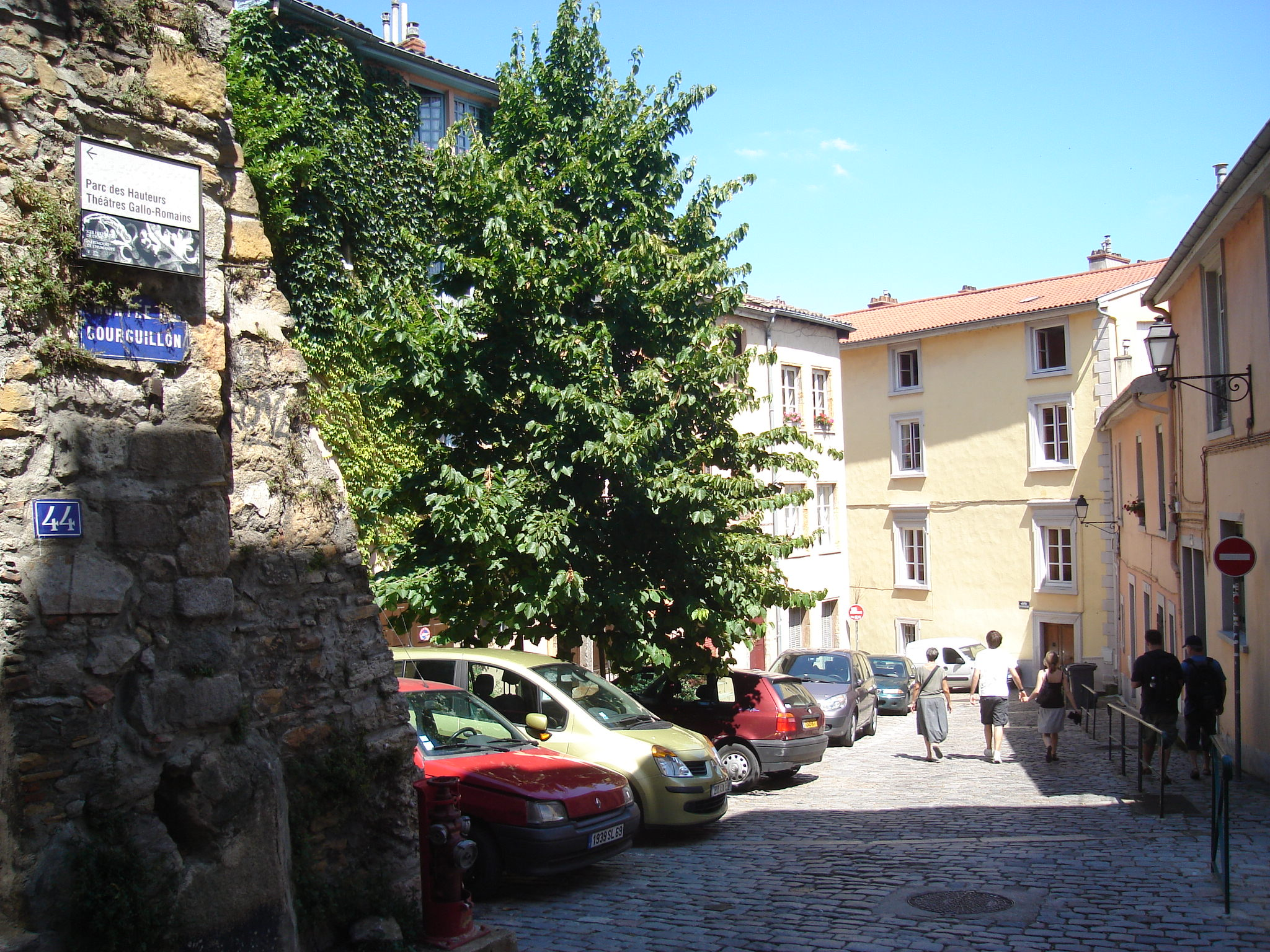
- Facades of the Montée du Gourguillon (Place Beauregard)
- Interactive map of Montée du Gourgillon
- Length: 400 m (1,300 ft)
- Location: 5th arrondissement of Lyon, Lyon, France
- Postal code: 69005

Construction
- Construction start: Roman times

The Montée du Gourguillon is an old street in the 5th arrondissement of Lyon, France, on the hill of Fourvière, between the Saint-Jean and Saint-Just quarters. Montée translates in English to the nouns "climb" or "rise " and is given to a number of steep streets. The ancient Roman settlement of Lugdunum was established here in 43 BC. The Montée du Gourguillon begins at the Place de la Trinité and ascends to the Rue des Farges. Fourvière is known as "the hill that prays" because the Basilica of Notre-Dame de Fourvière, several convents, and the Archbishop's residence are located there. The street belongs to a zone classified by UNESCO as a World Heritage Site.

== Origin of the name ==
There are various explanations for the name "gourguillon". The Latin noun "gurgulio", which means "gullet", is an onomatopoeia evoking the sound of rainwater rushing down the steep slope. Less credible sources suggest that the name may also come from "gurges sanguinis", referring to the blood of the martyrs killed in the year 177, flowing down the hill. Indeed, according to legend, the fourth battalion of the National Guard of France (1789–1871, 2015–present), which was recruited in this neighborhood in 1790, bore a flag with the Latin motto Dat sanguine palmas.

== Description ==
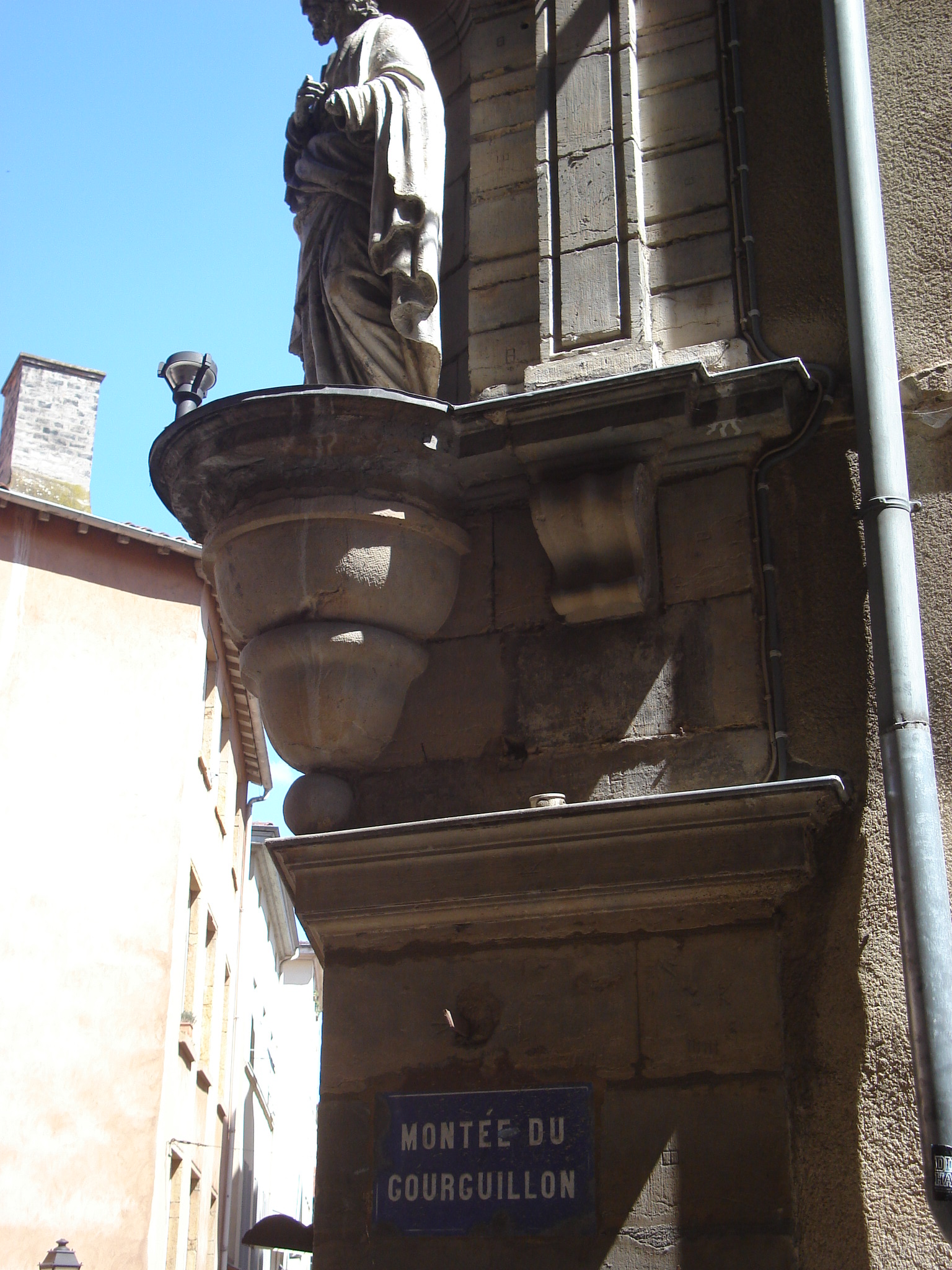
A statue and the plaque of the street

The Montée du Gourguillon is 400 meters long with an ascent of 53 meters, representing a slope of just over 7.5° on average. The street is wholly paved and has no sidewalk from the bottom to its intersection with the Montée des Épies. There are small steps at regular intervals (every 10 meters) over its entire length. The street is pedestrian, but residents are allowed to drive and many cars are parked there. 15th-century houses with mullioned windows, decorated with fantastic animals and grotesques, still survive, as do a very few timber-framed structures.

At No. 2, a private traboule with symmetrical galleries to a staircase overlooks the Montée du Chemin-Neuf. Between Nos. 5 and 7, the Impasse Turquet shows the oldest (14th century) wooden galleries in Lyon. On the western side, there are ruins until No 12 and, on the other side, high houses, then a large white stone portal with a garden. From No 14, buildings consist of houses and large garden walls alternatively. The Place Beauregard is located at the middle of the slope, where there is a slight widening of the square at the junction of stairs to the Montée des Épies. This square was created after 1540: It was not indicated on the plan of that year, and was created after a few houses were rebuilt and stepped back. The Montée des Épies opens on the left, with long stairs on the hillside down to the Saint-Georges quarter, and the Rue Armand-Caillat joins the Montée des Épies.

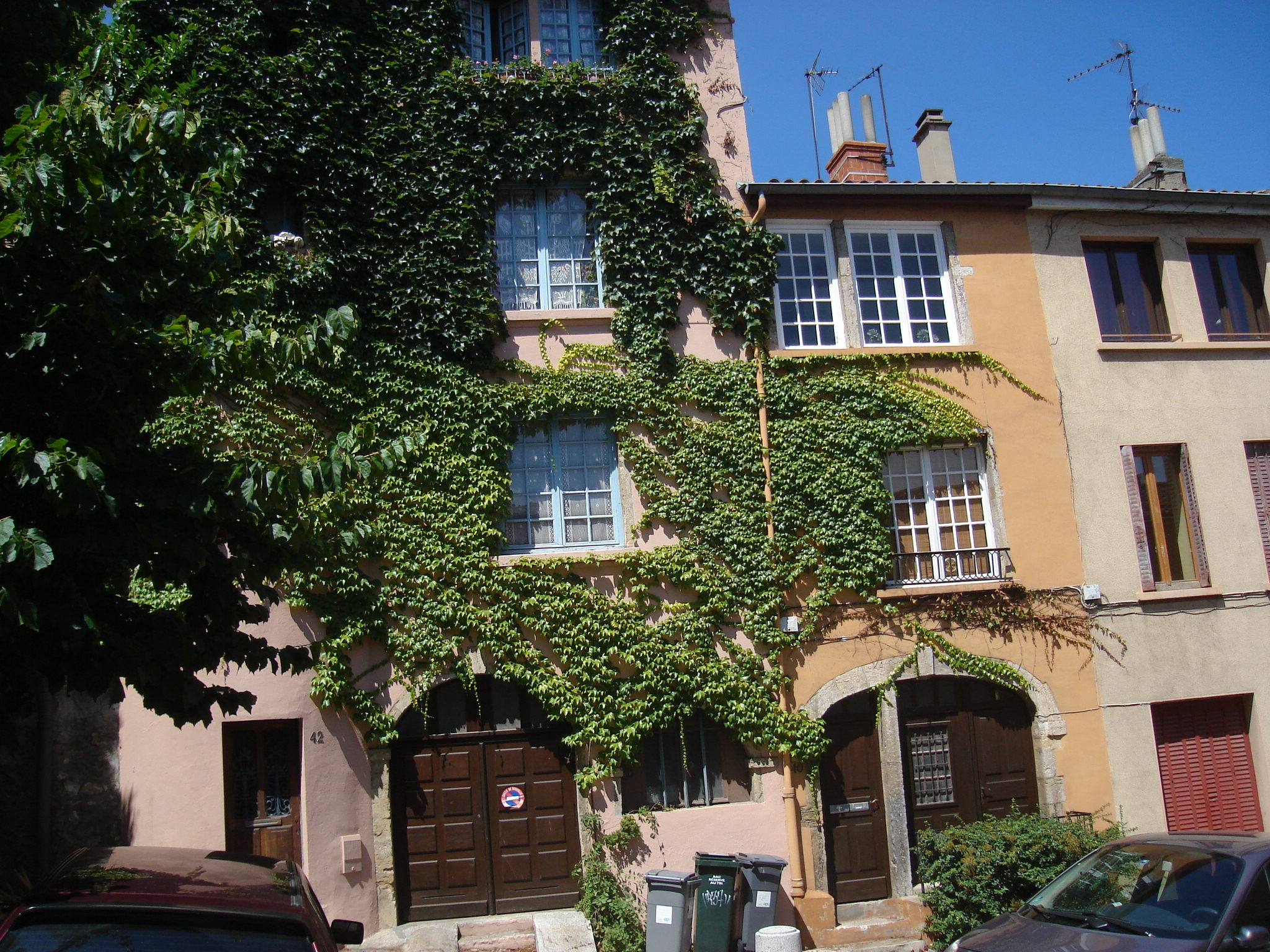
A building of the street

At its end, the Montée du Gourguillon divides into two routes: A staircase that leads into the Rue des Farges, before the school of Saint-Just, continues the street axis, and the opposite one continues the top of the paved hill, lined with sidewalks, which joins the Montée du Chemin-Neuf.

== History ==
From Roman times to the late 16th century, the Montée du Gourguillon was the sole road providing access to the Saint-Just quarter, and it was often used by processions of powerful men. In 1245, Pope Innocent IV; the Latin Emperor, Baldwin II; and Raymond VII, Count of Toulouse, used the Montée du Gourguillon on their way to the Cathedral of St. John the Baptist to open the 13th ecumenical council, also known as the First Council of Lyon. Originally, it was a natural road descending the hill of Fourvière to what is now known as Vieux Lyon, on the banks of the Saône river, thus connecting the two ancient centers of the city. Fourvière, the high center of the ancient city of Lugdunum, eventually diminished to the benefit of Vieux Lyon. In the Middle Ages, the street was called Beauregard. It was not lined with houses except at its lower end, and at its top the door of the city wall opened into the Saint-Just quarter, which was an independent village at that time..

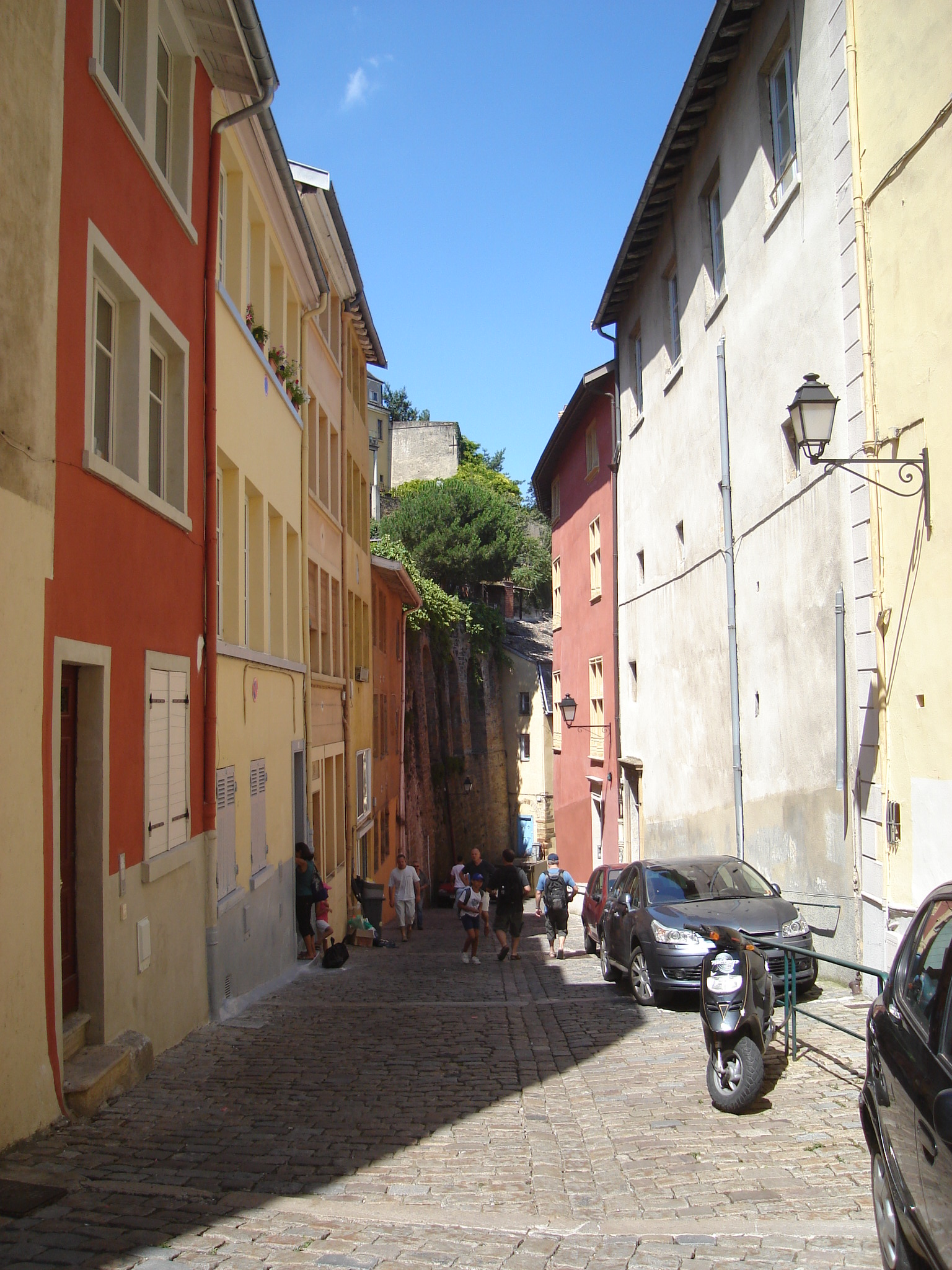
Other view of the street

According to a legend, during the AD 177 persecution, blood flowed down the Gourguillon so heavily that it flooded into the Arar River. Observers called the river "Sagona", from the Latin sanguinis, which then became "Saône". In 1218, the Dominicans moved to the Magdeleine Fort, which was fortified in 1271.

On 14 November 1305, a wall of the street on people were sitting collapsed on the procession of Pope Clement V, who had just been crowned Pope in the basilica of Saint-Just by the King of France, Philippe le Bel. Twelve people died in this accident, including the Pope's brother and John II, Duke of Brittany, who died three days after. The legend says that in his fall, the pope lost his crown and a precious stone worth 6,000 florins was knocked out and was eventually buried under the rubble. However, according to an account by Bartholomew of Lucca, it was found later. The Basilica of Saint-Justus was completely destroyed by Protestant troops in September 1562. The church was rebuilt on another site, and the ruins, scavenged for building materials, disappeared

Between 1525 and 1555, doctor of laws, humanist and archaeologist Guillaume De Choul received many scientists and scholars in his house in this street. A convent was built at the top, between 1577 and 1647, and was "one of the most significant of France". In the 16th century, the Trinitarian Sisters settled at No. 2. On 16 and 23 July 1658, respectively, Camille de Neuville and the consulate authorized them to construct a hospital to be used for hospitality for their religious order.

Jeanne Chezard de Martel established the Order of the Incarnate Word and Blessed Sacrament in Lyon, with the approval of Pope Urban VII, in 1633. It occupied the 27-meter facade part of the Magdaleine Fort that was erected in 1264, and the Florentine Orlandini home, was installed in 1655. Those sisters who survived the French Revolution, the decree abolishing convents and monasteries and the persecution that followed eventually found a home in the United States and Mexico.

The convent was replaced by the Institute of the Incarnate Word, a school led by a M. Guillard. Much-admired by Charles Joseph Chambet in his 1853 Nouveau guide pittoresque de l'etranger a Lyon, it had a dining room whose walls were hung with students' oil paintings, a covered gymnasium built under the direction of Colonel Francisco Amorós y Ondeano, who introduced "gymnastics", physical education, to France. The institute also had a magnificent view.

The family Laurencin prospered through the businesses of reselling property, owning inns and forges, and especially from textiles. The reign of Louis XI (1461–83) saw the establishment of four annual fairs, and François I (1515–1547) granted Lyon silk weaving privileges, breaking an Italian monopoly. People from Florence emigrated to Lyon, bringing expertise in banking and insurance. A Laurencin served as a Lyon consul nine times between 1470 and 1495. They moved into the world of the aristocracy, acquiring the seigneuries of Riverie (Rhône) and Châtelus et Fontanès (Loire), with the help of Anne of Brittany, Duchess of Brittany and twice Queen of France (1477–1514). The wife of Claude Laurencin was one of her attendants. Claude eventually became Baron de Riverie. He acquired the house that bears his name to this day in 1528. Located at 24 rue Saint Jean, it lost its original façade in the 18th century.

Several archeological finds have been made on the montée. In his 1825 travelogue, L'Hermite en Province, Étienne De Jouy describes ruined Roman amphitheaters and mentions the discovery, in a vineyard (or a garden, depending on the source) in 1676 of a mosaic (20 feet long and 10 feet wide) showing a contest between Love and the god Pan. A hermathena adorned the center, and a deity taking the role of a gymnasiarch carries a palm destined for the winner in one hand and gestures toward the central figure honoring Hermes and Athena with the other. The vineyard in which the mosaic was discovered was owned by the surgeon Cassaire, and it was placed in a museum in 1822.

A Roman cippus with a 15-line epitaph in honor of a nine-year-old boy was found in the house of Mr. Raymond, who donated it to the Museum of Lyon in 1843.

On 31 July 1847, another mosaic was unearthed in front of the Bouvier ladies' boarding house.

Another inscription was transported to the Île Barbe and was used at the foot of an altar in the chapel of St. Martin. Part of the inscription was lost in the move.

In 1849, four Masonic lodges held meetings at No. 22.

In 1873, a newspaper named La Gazette du Gourguillon was published and quickly disappeared.

In 1827, this street was described as "disgusting and dirty" due to "the black color of [its] dirty and badly built houses.

During World War II, Lyon was occupied by the Nazis, including dread Gestapo head Klaus Barbie, who became known as "the butcher of Lyon." The city was also a center of French Resistance, and the traboules and ancient byways of the oldest parts of the city provided a ready-made network to elude the occupiers.The Museum of Resistance (Centre d'Histoire de la Résistance et de la Deportation) was inaugurated in 1992.

== See also ==
- 5th arrondissement of Lyon
- Vieux Lyon
- World Heritage Site
- Museum of Fine Arts of Lyon
- Lugdunum (museum)
