= Margaret of the Blessed Sacrament =

Margaret of the Blessed Sacrament OCD
- Born: 6 March 1590; Paris, France
- Died: 24 May 1660 (aged 70); Paris, France

Margaret of the Blessed Sacrament, OCD (6 March 1590, in Paris – 24 May 1660, in Paris), was a French Discalced Carmelite nun. She was the second daughter of Marie of the Incarnation, who introduced the Reform of the Carmelite Order into France.

== Life ==
Born Marguerite Acarie, her father, Pierre Acarie, was one of the staunchest members of the Catholic League, which, after the death of King Henry III of France, opposed the succession of the Huguenot prince, Henry of Navarre, to the French throne. He was one of the 16 who organized resistance to this in Paris. After the dissolution of the League, brought about by the abjuration of Henry IV, Acarie was exiled from Paris and his wife had to remain behind to contend with creditors.

Facing financial difficulties, Madame Acarie placed her two sons at college and the elder two daughters with the Poor Clares at the Abbey of Longchamp. Marguerite and her younger sister, Genevieve, were taken in by relatives for a time.

Directed by Pierre de Bérulle, she took the religious habit at the first Discalced Carmelite convent in France, on the Rue St. Jacques, Paris, 15 September 1605. On 21 November 1606, she made her vows privately, and on 18 March 1607, she made them solemnly, under the care of Anne de Saint-Barthélemi. She kept up a correspondence for many years with Francis de Sales, a friend of her mother.

In 1615 she was made sub-prioress, and in 1618, prioress of the monastery at Tours, founded by Madeleine du Bois de Fontaines-Marans, a relative of Madame Acarie, and the father of Sister Madeleine de Saint-Joseph, (later declared Venerable). Sister Margaret was then sent in 1621 to restore harmony in the monastery at Bordeaux. Shortly after this she was ordered to the monastery of Saintes, where she remained for 18 months. In 1624 she was recalled to Paris, to replace as prioress Mother Madeleine de Saint-Joseph in the monastery situated on the Rue Chapon. After having been several times prioress of that monastery, where she showed a zeal for bodily mortification that her superiors had sometimes to moderate, she developed dropsy, of which she died.

== Veneration ==
Margaret's heart was taken to the monastery at Pontoise, where her mother had been buried, and her body remained in the monastery on Rue Chapon, where it was kept until 1792.

A cause for Margaret's beatification was formally opened on 19 June 1873, granting her the title of Servant of God. On 10 December 1905, Pope Pius X declared her Venerable.
