= Henri Perreyve =

French Oratorian priest

Henri Perreyve (born at Paris, 11 April 1831; died there 18 June 1865) was a French Oratorian priest. He was one of the small group who restored the Oratory in France.

== Life ==
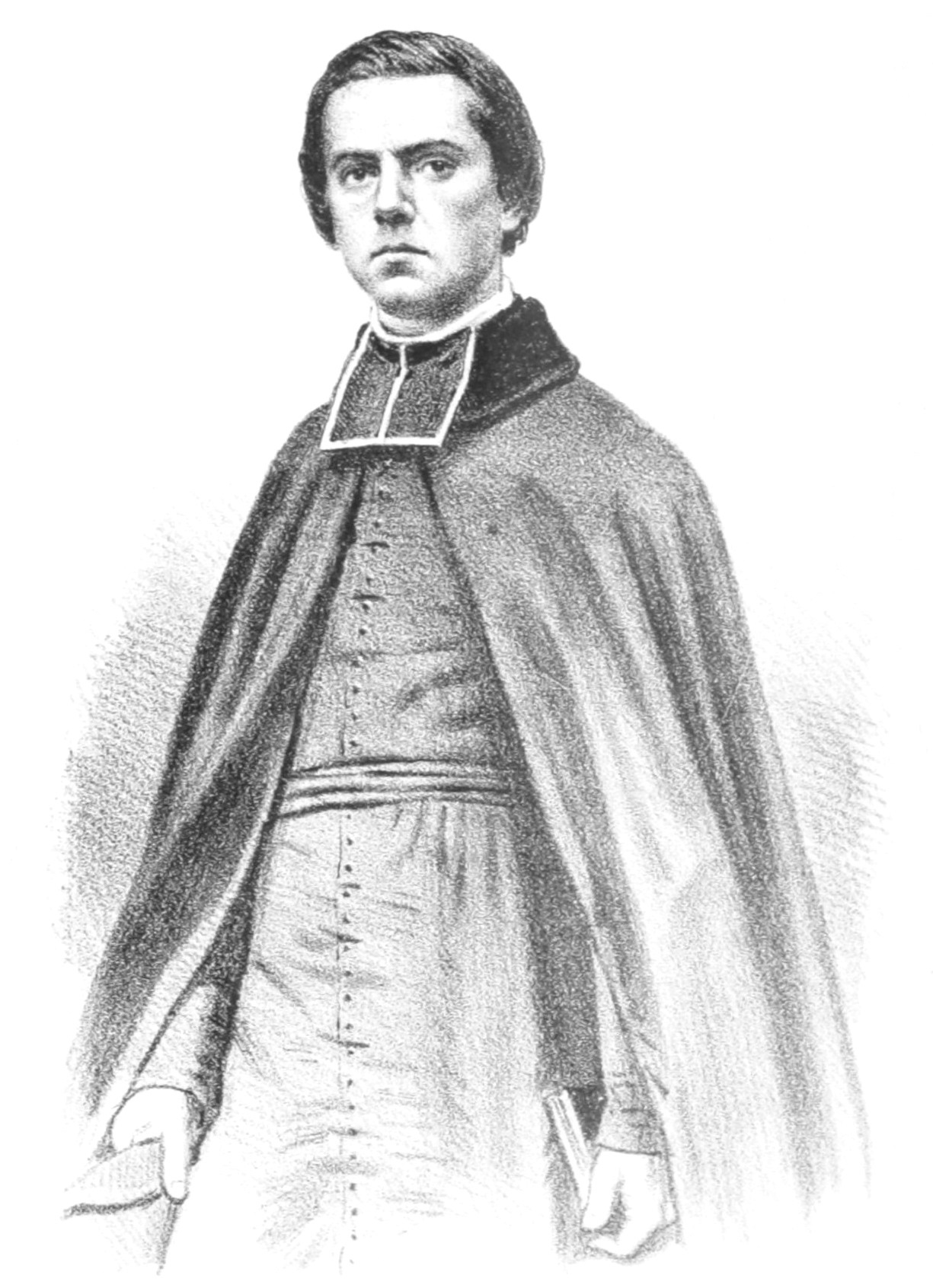
Portrait of Henri Perreyve

His father was professor at the Faculté de Droit. He received his classical education at the Collège Saint-Louis. According to his father's wish he studied law, but having finished his legal course he studied philosophy and theology.

He then became closely united with Charles and Adolphe Perraud. With Auguste Joseph Alphonse Gratry, and under the guidance of Father Pététol, they began the restoration of the Oratory.

He was ordained priest in 1858, appointed chaplain to the Lycée Saint-Louis in 1860, and one year later was called to the professorship of ecclesiastical history at the Sorbonne. For some time he was forced by illness to abandon his lectures.

He was an influential figure, and linked by friendship with the Catholic leaders of the time in France: Ozanam, Montalembert, Cochin, and especially Jean-Baptiste-Henri Lacordaire.

== Works ==
Among his works were:

- "De la critique des Evangiles" (Paris, 1859);
- "Entretiens sur l'Eglise catholique" (2 vols., Paris, 1901);
- "La Journée des malades" (Paris, 1908);
- "Biographies et panégyriques" (Paris, 1907);
- "Souvenirs de première communion" (Paris, 1899);
- "Sermons" (Paris, 1901);
- "Deux roses et deux Noëls" (Paris, 1907);
- "Méditations sur l'Evangile de Saint Jean" (Paris, 1907);
- "Méditations sur les saints ordres" (Paris, 1901).

Some of his letters have also been published in book form.
