= Marie of the Incarnation =

Marie of the Incarnation may refer to:

- Marie of the Incarnation (Carmelite) (1566–1618)
- Marie of the Incarnation (Ursuline) (1599–1672)
