= Oratory of Jesus =

Roman Catholic society of apostolic life

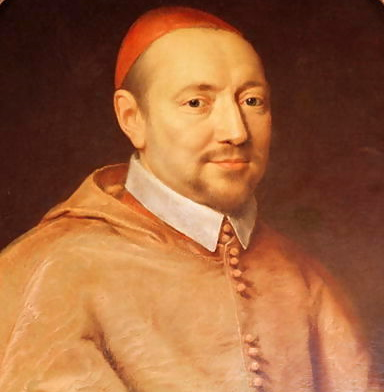
Cardinal Pierre de Bérulle, founder of the French Oratory

The Congregation of the Oratory of Jesus and Mary Immaculate (French: Société de l'Oratoire de Jésus et de Marie Immaculée, Latin: Congregatio Oratorii Iesu et Mariæ), best known as the French Oratory or Oratory of Jesus, is a society of apostolic life of Catholic priests founded in 1611 in Paris, France, by Pierre de Bérulle (1575–1629), who later became a cardinal. Members are known as Bérullians or Oratorians.

The French Oratory had a determinant influence on the French school of spirituality throughout the 17th century. It is separate and distinct from the Oratory of Saint Philip Neri, which served as its inspiration. The aim of the Society is to center spiritual life on the human aspect of Jesus, linked to the essence of God. Unlike the Oratory of Saint Philip Neri, whose communities are all autonomous, the French Oratory operates under the central authority of a superior general.

== History ==
=== Founding ===
In France, Bérulle, ordained a priest in 1599, felt that the clergy of the country had lost their spirit, seeking only the economic security of benefices. With the goal of restoring the spiritual commitment to their calling, on 11 November 1611, he and five other priests founded a society of priests, without the obligation of religious vows, in which one would dedicate one's entire strength to priestly perfection, in order to carry out all the functions of this ministry and to shape in piety those who aspired to this. Bérulle hoped that such priests would both inspire others of the French clergy, and blunt the attraction of Calvinism.

Taking the example of the Oratory of Saint Philip Neri in Rome, he envisioned secular clergy living together in community. However, Bérulle felt that the situation in France required a tighter organizational structure than Neri's communities in Italy, so the French Oratory operated under the authority of a Superior General. The Oratory received letters patent from King Louis XIII that same year. Pope Paul V authorized them on 10 May 1613. At the time of the founder's death in 1629, the Oratory numbered about 400 priests, living in some 60 communities.

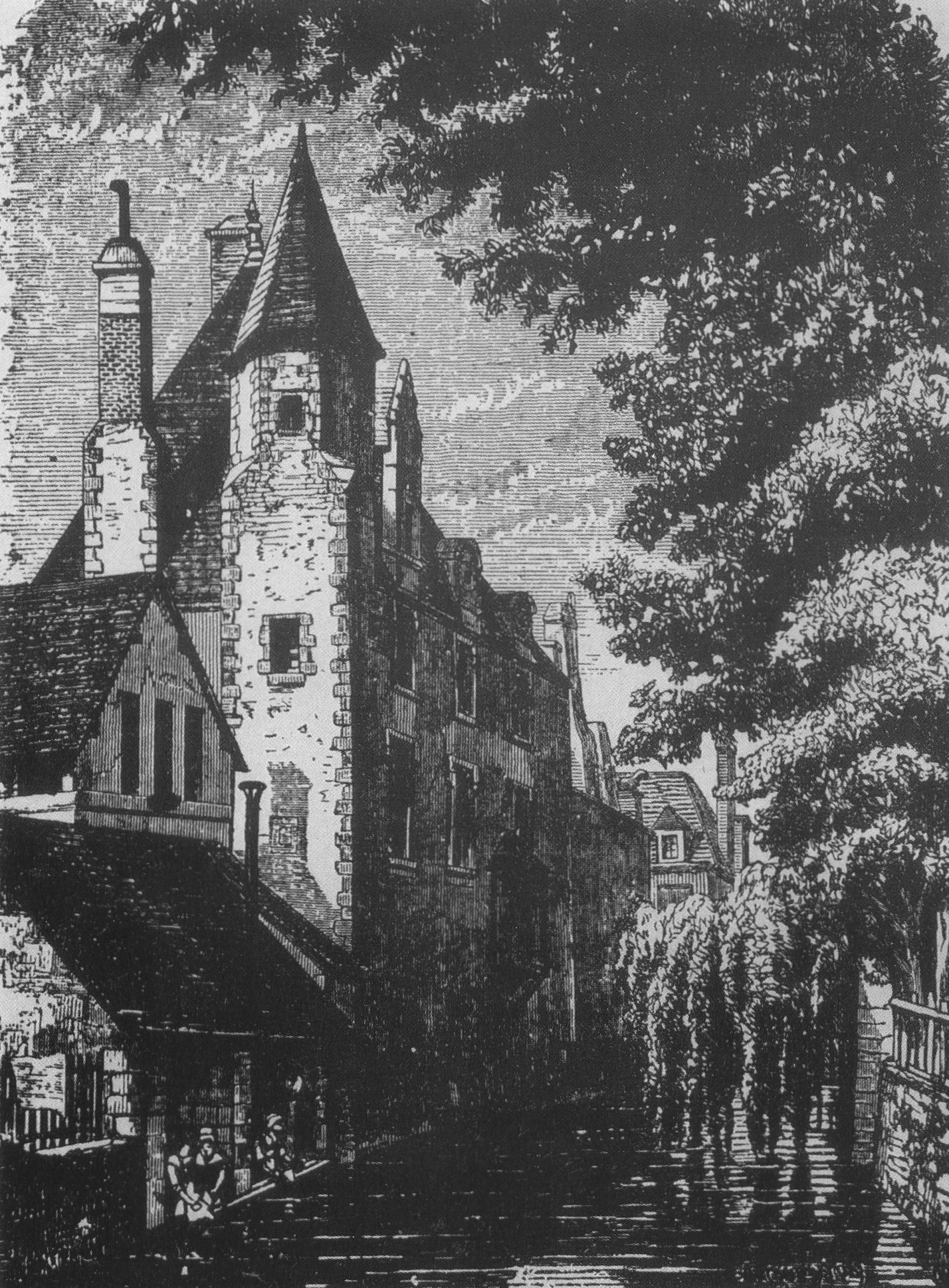
The Oratorian college in Vendôme, to which the author Honoré de Balzac was sent at the age of eight

Like the Jesuits and Capuchins, members of the French Oratory conducted parish missions. The French Oratory became very important in the area of spiritual direction, as the Fathers of the congregation were confessors of influential people, for example Charles de Condren, confessor to Prince Gaston of France, King Louis' brother, and were protected by the royal court, especially Queen Marie de Medici. They also were confessors to numerous monasteries of Discalced Carmelites, who had been established in France, through the efforts of Bérulle, under the leadership of the Blessed Marie of the Incarnation, OCD.

The church which the Oratorians built on the Rue Saint-Honoré in 1750 became the parish church of the royal court.

Although not a teaching order, it was the first to organize seminaries in France according to the ordinances of the Council of Trent. The Oratorians also became leading figures in the field of education in France and founded their own schools and colleges, such as the College of Juilly which they opened in 1638. In their schools, they taught in French, rather than the Latin used in the Jesuit schools. They had a curriculum which taught contemporary literature and the sciences. Their students learned modern foreign languages as opposed to the classical languages.

=== Dispersal ===
When the French Revolution broke out in 1789, initially the Fathers of the Oratory were very supportive of the ideals of liberty that it espoused, which fit into their corporate ethos. Despite this support, the Legislative Assembly of the new Republic dissolved all secular congregations in August 1792 and their communities and schools were disbanded. Some of the lay teachers in their schools, such as Jacques Nicolas Billaud-Varenne, became greatly involved with the Revolution.

Of the 288 members of the Oratory at that time, 51 chose to accept the Civil Constitution of the Clergy. They made up about one-fifth of the French clergy who did so. Of the rest of the Congregation, 15 were arrested and died either in prison or on the guillotine. The rest went into hiding or fled the country. The last Superior General had died in 1790, but, given the social upheavals going on, the Oratorians decided to wait it out before attempting to elect a successor, thinking that the situation would be only temporary.

=== Restoration ===
Several attempts were made to re-establish the Congregation after the Catholic Church was allowed to function again in the nation. They were successful only in 1852, under the leadership of the Abbé Joseph Gratry, together with the Abbés Pierre Pététot (1801–1888) and Hyacinthe de Valroger.

Gratry was an academic, holding doctorates in both the humanities and theology. He was named the Almoner of the École Normale Supérieure in 1846, which placed him at the center of intellectual life of the period. He envisioned communities which could be schools of theological exploration, working with the scientific focus of modern society. Pététot was a pastor in Paris, who saw the clergy of the day as worldly and poorly formed. When they met, they found that they shared a desire for secular priests living in community, without vows.

In 1903, forced to leave the country as a result of the anti-clerical laws of the Third French Republic, the Oratorians took refuge in Switzerland, returning to France only in 1920.

== Current status ==
As of 2019, they numbered 35 members in 13 locations.

== Legacy ==
The Society of Priests of Saint Sulpice was founded in 1641 with the purpose of the education of priests, by Jean-Jacques Olier, a disciple of Oratorian Charles de Condren.

John Eudes was a member of the Oratory before leaving to establish the Congregation of Jesus and Mary.

== Notable Oratorians ==
- Louis Bouyer
- Nicolas Malebranche
- Jean-Baptiste Massillon
- Henri Perreyve
- Pasquier Quesnel
- Achille Harlay de Sancy
- Richard Simon
- Hyacinthe de Valroger

== Sources ==
- McGrath-Merkle, Clare. Berulle's Spiritual Theology of Priesthood. Aschendorff Verlag, 2018.
