= Louis Bouyer =

French priest and theologian (1913–2004)

The Reverend Fr Louis Bouyer
- Born: 17 February 1913; Paris, France
- Died: 22 October 2004 (aged 91); Paris, France
- Occupations: Priest, scholar

Ecclesiastical career
- Religion: Christianity
- Church: Catholic Church (formerly Lutheran)
- Congregations: Oratory of Jesus

Louis Bouyer (17 February 1913 – 22 October 2004) was a French Catholic priest and former Lutheran minister who was received into the Catholic Church in 1939. During his religious career he was an influential theological thinker, especially in the fields of history, liturgy and spirituality, and as peritus helped shape the vision of the Second Vatican Council. He was a member of the Oratory of Jesus.

Along with Cardinal Joseph Ratzinger, Hans Urs von Balthasar, and others, he was a co-founder of the international review Communio. He was chosen by the pope to be part of a team to initiate the International Theological Commission in 1969.

== Life and career ==
Born into a Protestant family in Paris, Bouyer, after receiving a degree from the Sorbonne, studied theology with the Protestant faculties of the universities of Paris and then Strasbourg. He was ordained a Lutheran minister in 1936 and served as vicar of the Lutheran parish of the Trinity in Paris until World War II. In 1939, the study of the Christology and ecclesiology of Athanasius of Alexandria led Bouyer to the Catholic Church.

Received into the Catholic Church at the Abbey of Saint Wandrille (Seine-Maritime), he entered the congregation of the priests of the Oratory of Jesus and remained with them the rest of his life. He was a professor at the Catholic Institute of Paris until 1963 and then taught in England, Spain, and the United States. In 1969 he wrote The Decomposition of Catholicism, which presented what he saw as important liturgical and dogmatic problems in the church.

Twice appointed by the pope to the International Theological Commission, he was a consultant at the Second Vatican Council for the liturgy, the Congregation of Sacred Rites and Secretariat for Christian Unity, recording in his memoirs a general negative impression of the council. In 1999 he received the Cardinal-Grente prize of the French Academy for all his work.

He died on 22 October 2004 in Paris after many years with Alzheimer's. He was buried at the cemetery of the Abbey of Saint Wandrille.

== Published works in English ==
- The Paschal Mystery. Meditations on the Last Three Days of Holy Week (1951)
- Life and Liturgy (Liturgical Piety) (1955)
- The Spirit and Forms of Protestantism (1956)
- Newman: His Life and Spirituality (London: Burns & Oates, 1958)
- Introduction to Spirituality (1961)
- The Word, Church and Sacraments in Protestantism and Catholicism (1961)
- The Seat of Wisdom: An Essay on the Place of the Virgin Mary in Christian theology (1962)
- Rite and Man: The Sense of the Sacral and Christian Liturgy (1963)
- Liturgy and Architecture (1967)
- The Eucharist (1968)
- The Decomposition of Catholicism (Chicago, 1969)
- The Spirituality of the New Testament and the Fathers (History of Christian Spirituality; v. 1) (1982)
- The Spirituality of the Middle Ages (History of Christian Spirituality; v. 2) (1982)
- Cosmos: The World and the Glory of God (1988)
- The Invisible Father (St Bede's Publications, 1999)
- The Church of God: Body of Christ and Temple of the Holy Spirit (2011)
- The Memoirs of Louis Bouyer: From Youth and Conversion to Vatican II, the Liturgical Reform, and After (Angelico Press, August 2015)

== Bibliography ==
- "Le métier de théologien" – Interviews with Georges Daix, Éditions France-Empire, 1979.
- "Trois liturgistes. Héritage et actualité. Louis Bouyer, Pierre Jounel, Pierre-Marie Gy", review La Maison-Dieu, No. 246, 2006, 183 p.
- De Rémur, Guillaume Bruté. La théologie trinitaire de Louis Bouyer, Editrice Pontificia Università Gregoriana, Rome, 2010, 378 p.
- Duchesne, Jean. Louis Bouyer, ed. Artège, Perpignan, 2011, 127 p.
- Zordan, Davide. Connaissance et mystère. L'itinéraire théologique de Louis Bouyer, Paris: Editions du Cerf, 2008, 807 p.
