= Place de la Trinité =

Square in Lyon, France

Coordinates: 45°45′34″N 4°49′32″E

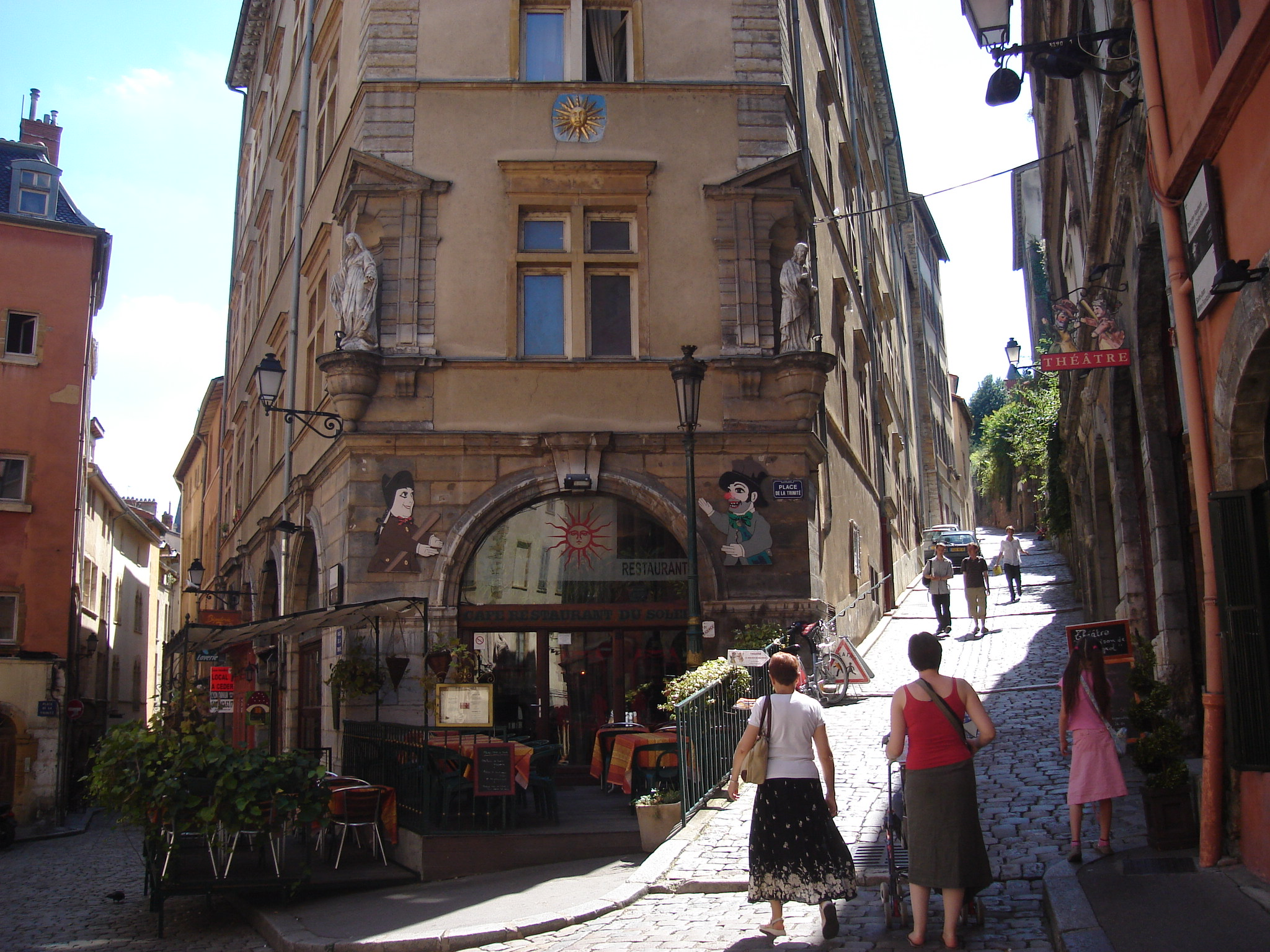
The Place de la Trinité, and the montée du Gourguillon on the right

The Place de la Trinité is a square located in the 5th arrondissement of Lyon. The square, fully paved and surrounded by old buildings like the sun house (18th century), is more a crossing of small streets than a real square. It is on the hillside of Fourvière and is the low extremity of the hill of Gourguillon. The square is in the center of the zone classified as World Heritage Site by UNESCO.

== History ==
The street was first named "Le treyve du Gourguillon".

In 1658, archbishop Camille de Neuville did come to Lyon the Regular Canons of St. Augustine. They were installed on the square in 1664 in a house successively owned by the Bellièvres, the De Langes and the De Sèves. As they belonged to the Order of the Holy Trinity, the place was renamed Place de la Trinité. On 10 January 1794, it was renamed Place du Triangle before reverting to its former name after the French Revolution.

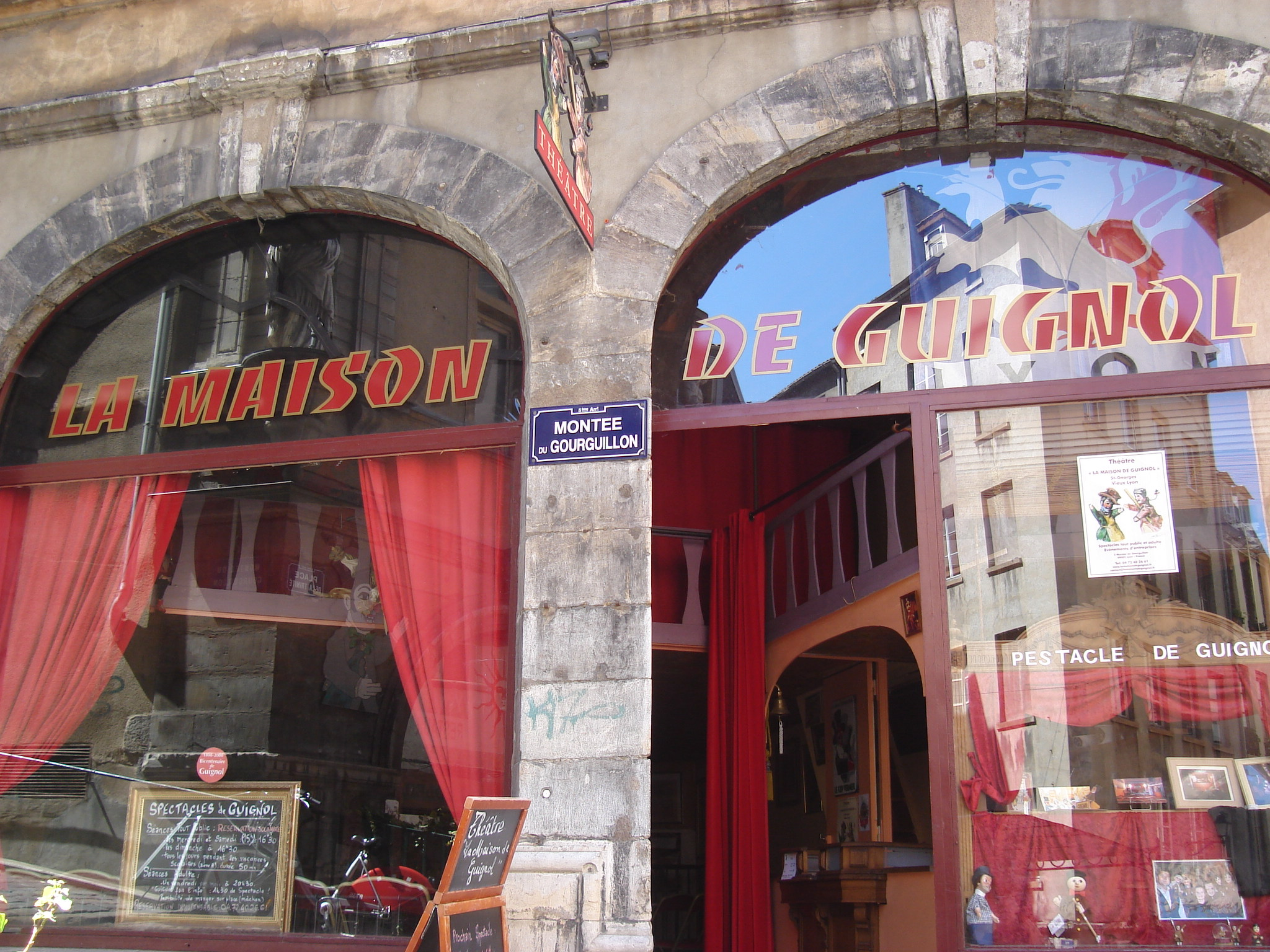
The Guignol's house

On the square, at the corner with the montée du Gourguillon, there is the sun house, which was built in 1723 and was named so because a golden sun on a blue background is painted between the first and the second floor. The building currently houses on the ground floor a coffeehouse (also named bouchon) of the same name. The waters rushing down the montée du Gourguillon were once collected in the Fontaine des Trois Cornets (fountain of the Three Cones).

The coffeehouse and the square are particularly popular as they are the traditional decoration of the Guignol theater.

== Architecture ==
All the houses of the square are rather old. The "house of the sun", located at No. 2 rue Saint-Georges, was built in the 17th or 18th century by architect Philibert Delorme. Its northern facade is decorated with the figures of Guignol and Gnafron, a golden sun, a statue of a Madonna and a statue of St. Peter. The facade between the montée du Gourguillon and the Rue Tramassac was restored with mullions on three arches of entry and a niche with a head of a lion fountain. The sun is a reference to the owner of the house in the 18th century, named Barou du Soleil.

== See also ==
- List of streets and squares in Lyon
