= Hyacinthe de Valroger =

French Catholic priest and Oratorian

Hyacinthe de Valroger, CO (6 January 1814, at Caen – 10 October 1876), was a French Catholic priest and Oratorian.

== Career ==
As a young man, Valroger first studied medicine, but later entered the seminary and was ordained a priest in 1837, after which he made Director of the minor seminary of Bayeux. In 1847 he became a titular canon of Bayeux Cathedral. In 1852 he joined Joseph Gratry in the work of restoring the French Oratory, where he became professor of theology, Master of novices and assistant Superior General.

De Valroger believed that the theory of evolution could be reconciled with the Book of Genesis. He was critical of Darwinism but did not entirely reject evolution. He has been described as a "theistic vitalist".

He criticized natural theories of the origin of life. He embraced a spiritual theory of spontaneous generation. He argued against the idea of abiogenesis, claiming that there was an intervention of "intelligence" (which he equated with God) acting upon the organization of living matter.

== Selected publications ==
Besides many articles in Catholic reviews he published:

- "Etudes critiques sur le rationalisme contemporain" (Paris, 1846);
- "Essai sur la crédibilité de l'histoire évangélique en réponse au Dr. Strauss' (Paris, 1847);
- "Du christianisme et du paganisme dans l'enseignement" (Paris, 1852);
- "Introduction historique et critique aux livres du Nouveau Testament" (Paris, 1861);
- "L'âge du monde et de l'homme d'après la Bible et l'église" (Paris, 1869);
- "La genèse des espèces, études philosophiques et religieuses" (Genesis of Species, Philosophical and Religious Studies on Natural History and Contemporary Naturalists, Paris, 1873);
- "Pensées philosophiques et religieuses du Comte de Maistre" (Paris, 1879).
