= Alphonse Gratry =

French Catholic priest, author and theologian

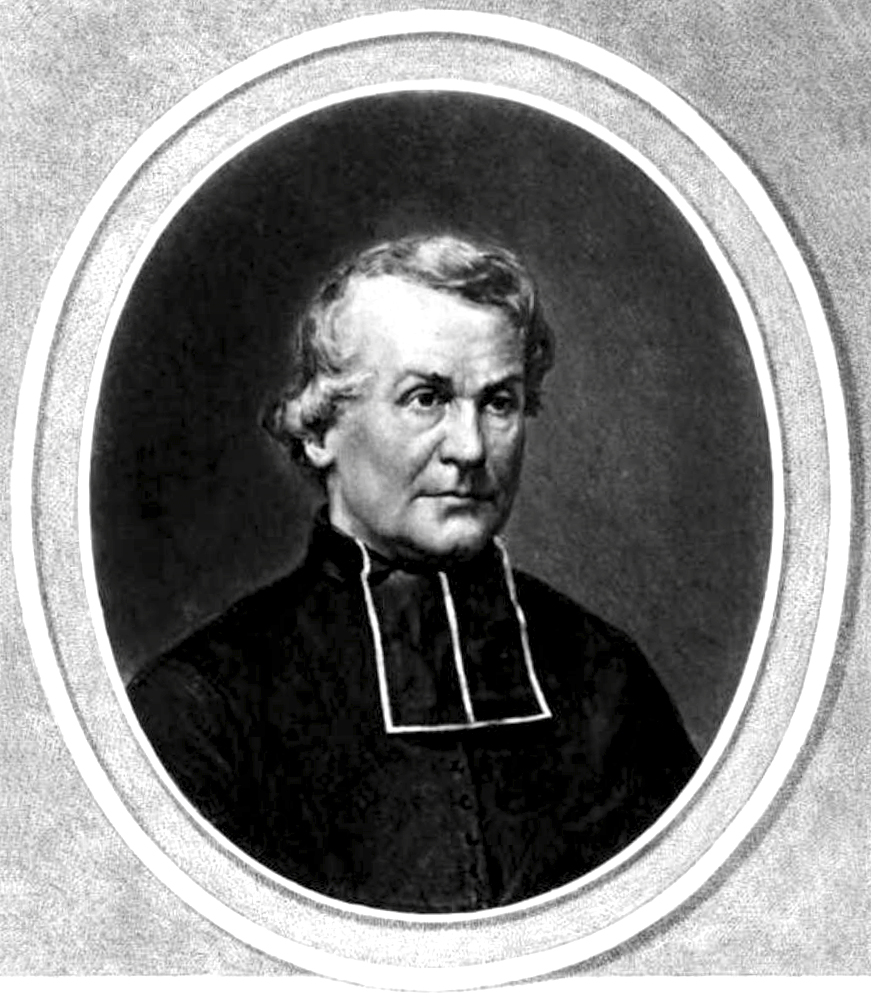
Alphonse Gratry

Auguste Joseph Alphonse Gratry (10 March 1805 − 6 February 1872) was a French Catholic priest and theologian. He was a proponent of French spiritualism.

== Biography ==
Gratry was born at Lille into the Gratry family, and educated at the École Polytechnique of Paris. In 1828, he went on to study theology at seminary in Strasbourg under the tutelage of the abbé Bautain. After a period of mental struggle which he has described in Souvenirs de ma jeunesse, he was ordained a priest in Strasbourg in 1832. After a stay there as professor of the Petit Séminaire, he was appointed director of the Collège Stanislas in Paris in 1842 and, in 1847, chaplain of the École Normale Supérieure. He was awarded the Order of the Legion of Honor in 1845.

In 1852 he and Abbé Pierre Pététot revived Bérulle's Congregation of the Oratory. Gratry was a brilliant academic, holding doctorates in both the humanities and theology. He envisioned communities which could be schools of theological exploration, working with the scientific focus of modern society.

He became vicar-general for the bishop of Orleans in 1861, professor of moral theology at the Sorbonne in 1863, and, on the death of Barante, a member of the Académie française in 1867, where he occupied the seat formerly held by Voltaire.

Together with Abbé Philippe Pététot, pastor of Saint Roch, and Hyacinthe de Valroger, Joseph Gratry reconstituted the French Oratory, a society of priests mainly dedicated to education.

Gratry developed throat cancer at the end of his life and went to Montreux, Switzerland, for treatment, where he died. He was buried in Montparnasse Cemetery in Paris by his sister.

== Works ==
- De la connaissance de Dieu, (The Knowledge of God) opposing Positivism (1855)
- La Logique (1856)
- Les Sources, conseils pour la conduite de l'esprit (1861−1862)
- La Philosophie du credo (1861)
- Commentaire sur l'évangile de Saint Matthieu (1863)
- Jésus-Christ: réponse à M. Renan (1864)
- Les Sophistes et la critique (in controversy with E. Vacherot) (1864)
- La Morale et la loi de l'histoire, (Morality and the law of History), (1868)
- Mgr. l'évêque d'Orléans et Mgr. l'archevêque de Malines (1869), containing a clear exposition of the historical arguments against the doctrine of papal infallibility.
- Souvenirs de ma jeunesse (1874)

== Sources ==
- Marias, Julian. La filosofia del Padre Gratry; 2nd ed. Buenos Aires: Editorial Sudamericana, 1948 (in Spanish)
