= Eugène de Lamerlière =

French writer and playwright (1797– c.1841)

Eugène de Lamerlière, full name Hugues-Marie Humbert Bocon de La Merlière, (5 January 1797 in Saint-Marcellin, Isère – c. 1841 in Blida, Algeria) was a French writer and playwright.

== Biography ==
Born into a family of the nobility of the Dauphiné of which he was the last representative, he studied law at Grenoble, then joined the army in 1812. From 1814 to 1817 he was part of the military house of Louis XVIII

In 1819, he moved to Paris and became a friend of Charles Nodier who introduced him into the literary circles. He made his debut in literature in 1821 with a sentimental novel, Souvenirs de madame Jenny L..

The success he obtained with some of his plays performed in Paris allowed him to establish a dramatic performance center in Lyon (1824). He presented there some fifty plays (drama, comedy and vaudeville), very few of which have been published.

In 1832, he founded the literary journal Le Papillon which he sold a few months later to Léonard Boitel. In 1836, he bought the newspaper Le Commerce of which he was editor until 1840.

In 1841, he settled in Algeria at Blida. No trace of him is found after that date

== Works ==
Some of his plays were given in Lyon and Paris (Théâtre des Variétés), most of them now completely forgotten.

- 1822: Le Comédien de Paris ou Assaut de travestissements, vaudeville in 1 act, with Armand d'Artois
- 1822: L'Amateur à la porte, ou la Place du Louvre, vaudeville in 1 act, with Édouard-Joseph-Ennemond Mazères
- 1822: Le Matin et le soir, ou la Fiancée et la mariée, comedy in 2 acts, mixed with couplets, with Armand d'Artois and René-André-Polydore Alissan de Chazet
- 1823: Stanislas, ou la Sœur de Christine, vaudeville in 1 act, with Emmanuel Théaulon
- 1824: Le Monstre
- 1824: Le Damné
- 1825: L'Actrice chez elle, ou C'est ma femme, comédie en vaudevilles in 1 act
- 1827: Sainte-Périne, ou l'Asile des vieillards, tableau-vaudeville in 1 act, with Théaulon and Armand Joseph Overnay
- 1828: L'Amoureux de sa tante, ou Une heure de jalousie, vaudeville in 2 acts
- 1828: Le Départ pour la Grèce, ou l'Expédition de la Morée, à-propos-vaudeville in 1 act
- 1829: Les Martyrs lyonnais, ou la Ligue de 1829, à-propos in verses
- 1830: Napoléon, ou la Vie d'un grand homme, contemporary drama in 3 acts and in 10 tableaux
- 1830: Laurette, ou 3 mois à Paris, comédie en vaudevilles in 3 acts and in 3 periods, with Charles-Joseph Chambet
- 1830: Le Drapeau tricolore, ou Trois journées de 1830, à propos patriotique in 3 tableaux, mixed with couples and extravaganza
- 1830: La Lyonnaise, song
- 1831: L'Ile de Scio, ou la Délivrance de la Grèce, ballet héroïque in 3 acts
- 1835: Poleska, sœur de Christine, vaudeville in 1 act, with Théaulon
- 1837: Sous Constantine, à-propos-vaudeville in 1 act, mixed with couplets, with Joachim Duflot
- 1837: Les Giboulées de mars, April Fools' Day in 11 pieces
- 1840: Mazagran, ou les 123, military à-propos in three parts, with Duflot
- 1840: Lyon en 1840, an account of the floods that harmed this city and the Rhône department
- 1856: Le Sourd, ou l'Auberge pleine, comedy in 1 act, with Desgroseillez, Pierre Jean Baptiste Choudard Desforges and Charles-Gaspard Delestre-Poirson
- Adieux à Paris et autres opuscules

== Bibliography ==
- Adolphe Rochas, Biographie du Dauphiné, 1860, p. 23
- Edmond Maignien, Dictionnaire des ouvrages anonymes et pseudonymes du Dauphiné, 1892
- Albert Albertin, André Albertin, Histoire contemporaine de Grenoble et de la région dauphinoise, 1900, p. 508
- Eugène Vial, Paul Mariéton, Marceline Desbordes-Valmore et ses amis lyonnais, 1923, p. 67
- Sylvie Vielledent, 1830 aux théâtres, 2009, p. 121
