= Charles-Joseph Chambet =

French bookseller, bibliophile and writer (1792–1867)

- Born: 6 September 1792; Vourles (Rhône department)
- Died: 16 November 1867 (aged 75); Lyon
- Occupations: Bookseller, playwright

Charles-Joseph Chambet (6 September 1792 – 16 November 1867) was a French bookseller, essayist, bibliophile and playwright.

A bookseller in Lyon, his plays were presented at the Théâtre des Célestins.

== Works ==
- 1815: Le conducteur de l'étranger à Lyon
- 1816: Emblèmes des fleurs, ou Parterre de Flore
- 1822: Almanach des Muses de Lyon et du Midi de la France
- 1822: Le langage de l'amour, in prose and in verses
- 1823: Tablettes historiques et littéraires
- 1823: Extrait du catalogue de la librairie de Chambet fils aîné
- 1824: Anecdotes du dix-neuvième siècle et de la fin du dix-huitième, la plupart secrètes et inédites
- 1824: Les souvenirs d'un oisif, ou l'esprit des autres
- 1824: Amour et galanterie, vaudeville in 1 act, with Liénard
- 1828: Choix de caractères, anecdotes, petits dialogues philosophiques, maximes et pensées
- 1830: Laurette ou Trois mois à Paris, comédie en vaudevilles in 3 acts and 3 periods, with A.-F. Liénard and Eugène de Lamerlière
- 1831: Histoire de l'inondation
- 1833: Théodore
- 1836: Guide pittoresque de l'étranger à Lyon
- 1853: Nouveau guide pittoresque de l’étranger à Lyon

== Bibliography ==
- Biographie contemporaine des gens de lettres de Lyon, 1826, p. 22-23 (Read on line)
- Joseph Marie Quérard, Les supercheries littéraires dévoilées, Vol.5, 1853, p. 102
