= Marie of the Incarnation (Carmelite) =

French Discalced Carmelite and Blessed

Blessed Marie of the Incarnation OCD
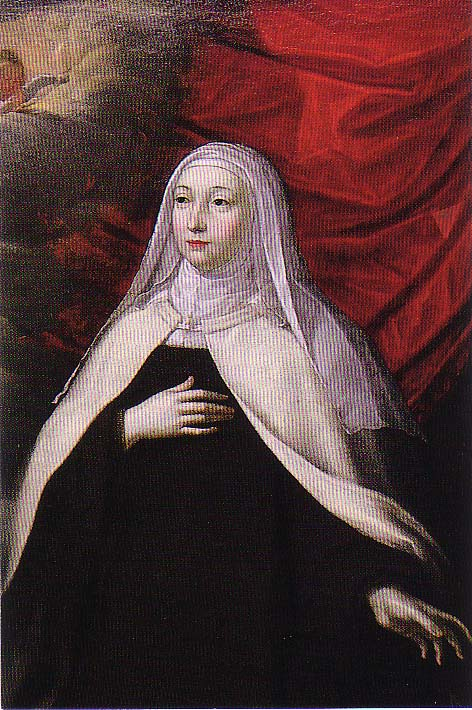
- Born: 1 February 1566; Paris, Kingdom of France
- Died: 18 April 1618 (aged 52); Pontoise, Île-de-France, Kingdom of France
- Venerated in: Roman Catholic Church
- Beatified: 24 April 1791, Saint Peter's Basilica, Rome by Pope Pius VI
- Feast: 26 April
- Influences: Teresa of Avila
- Influenced: Francis de Sales, Francis Xavier

Marie of the Incarnation, OCD, also known as Madame Acarie (1 February 1566–18 April 1618), was the foundress of the Discalced Carmel in France and later became an extern sister of the order.

== Biography ==
" La bell'Acarie" ("the beautiful Acarie"), as she was known in Paris, was born Barbara Avrillot in Paris. Her family belonged to the higher bourgeois society; her father, Nicholas Avrillot, was accountant general in the Chamber of Paris, and chancellor of Marguerite of Navarre, the first wife of Henry IV of France; while her mother, Marie Lhuillier, was a descendant of Etienne Marcel, the famous chief municipal magistrate. Avrillot was placed with the Poor Clares of the Abbey of Longchamp, where she had a maternal aunt, for her education, and acquired there a vocation for the cloister. In 1584, through obedience she married Pierre Acarie, viscount of Villemor, a wealthy young man of high standing, who was a fervent Catholic, to whom she bore seven children. Pierre Acarie disapproved of Barbe's reading romance novels and with clerical advice removed the books and substituted books of a more pious and spiritual bent.

Pierre Acarie was one of the staunchest members of the Catholic League, which, after the death of Henry III of France, opposed the succession of the Huguenot prince, Henry of Navarre, to the French throne. He was one of the sixteen who organized the resistance in Paris and partly responsible for the subsequent famine which resulted from the siege of Paris (1590). Barbara Acarie was so wise in her almsgiving that during a famine the wealthy persons who desired to help the poor caused their alms to pass through her hands, and she was widely respected. After the dissolution of the League, brought about by the abjuration of Henry IV, Acarie was exiled from Paris and his wife had to remain behind to contend with creditors and businessmen for her children's fortune, which had been compromised by her husband's want of foresight and prudence. She defended her husband in court, drafting memoirs, writing letters and furnishing proofs of his innocence. He was acquitted and enabled to return to the city after three years. In addition she was afflicted with physical sufferings, the consequences of a fall from her horse, and a very severe course of treatment left her an invalid for the rest of her life.

At the beginning of the seventeenth century, Acarie was widely known for her virtue, her supernatural gifts, and especially her charity towards the poor and the sick in the hospitals. To her residence came all the distinguished and devout people of the day in Paris, among them Madame de Meignelay, a model of Christian widows, Madame Jourdain and Madame de Bréauté, all future Carmelites, the chancellor de Merillac, Père Coton, the Jesuit, as well as Vincent de Paul and Francis de Sales, who for six months was Acarie's spiritual director.

She is reputed to have had the gift of healing, the gift of prophecy, of predicting certain events in the future, of reading hearts and of discerning spirits. At the age of twenty-seven, she received the stigmata, the grace of physical conformity to the suffering Christ. She is the first Frenchwoman the authenticity of whose stigmata (although invisible) have been attested by eminent persons.

In 1601 she was introduced to the Life of Teresa of Avila and was greatly moved by her life. A few days later Acarie had a vision of Teresa, appearing to her and informing her that God wished to make use of her to found Carmelite convents in France. The apparitions continuing, Acarie took counsel and began the work. A meeting in which Pierre de Bérulle, the future founder of the Oratory of Jesus, Francis de Sales, the Abbé de Brétigny, and the Marillac's took part, decided on the foundation of the Reformed Carmel in France, 27 July 1602. Francis de Sales was the one who wrote to the pope to obtain authorization and Pope Clement VIII granted the bull of institution on 23 November 1603. The following year some Spanish Carmelites were received into the Carmel of Rue St. Jacques, which became celebrated. Mme de Longueville, Anne de Gonzague, Mlle de la Vallieres, withdrew to it; there also Jacques-Bénigne Bossuet and François Fénelon were to preach. The Carmel spread rapidly and profoundly influenced French society of the day. Acarie also cooperated in the new foundations of Pontoise (1605), Dijon (1605) and Amiens (1606). In 1618, the year of Mme Acarie's death, it numbered fourteen houses.

Acarie also shared in two foundations of the day, that of the Oratory and that of the Ursulines. On 11 November 1611, she, with Vincent de Paul, assisted at the Mass of the installation of the Oratory in France. Among the many postulants whom Acarie received for the Carmel, there were some who had no vocation, and she conceived the idea of getting them to undertake the education of young girls, and broached her plan to her cousin, Mme. de Sainte-Beuve. To establish the order, they brought Ursulines to Paris and adopted their rule and name.

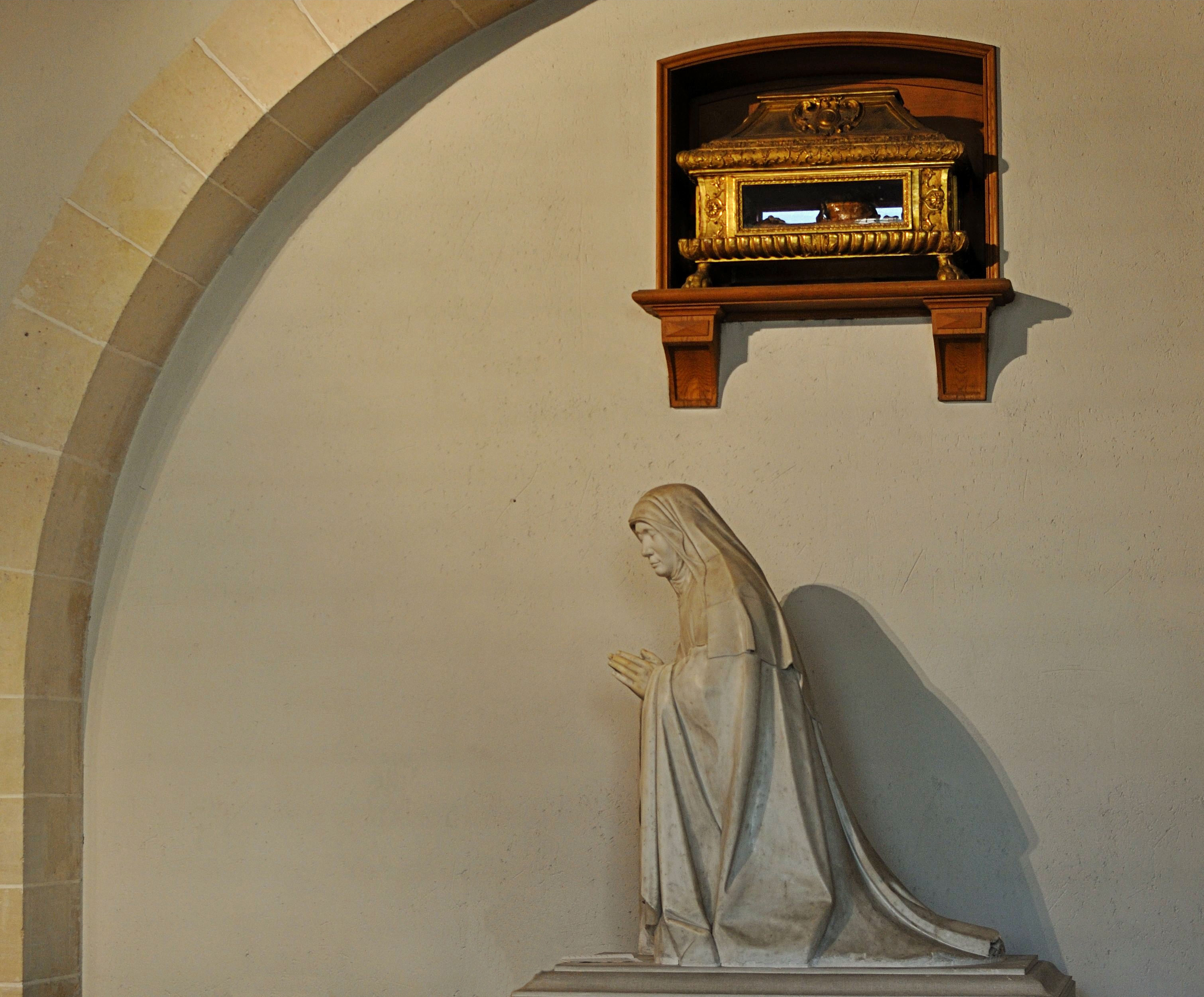
Reliquary and statue of Marie of the Incarnation in the chapel of the Carmel of Pontoise

When her husband died in 1613, his widow settled her affairs and begged leave to enter the Carmel, asking as a favour to be received as an extern sister in the poorest community. In 1614 she entered the convent of Amiens, taking the religious name Marie of the Incarnation. Her three daughters had preceded her into the Carmel, and one of them, Margaret of the Blessed Sacrament, was sub-prioress at Amiens.

Marie of the Incarnation made her perpetual vows on 8 April 1615, in the course of a prolonged sickness. She was heavily influenced by the piety exhibited in the death of St. Francis Xavier, and asserted a desire to die as he had died, namely, bereft of all physical recourse. In 1616, for reasons of health, she was sent to the Carmelite convent at Pontoise, where she died at the age of fifty-two. St. Francis de Sales considered her death in spiritual poverty as laudable as that of St. Francis Xavier's, who died in utter physical poverty.

== Veneration ==
Paul de Montis wrote a biography on the Carmelite, which was published in 1778.

The process for beatification was opened in Rome in 1627. Acarie was beatified by Pope Pius VI in 1791. That year, another biography appeared. Another biography followed suit, as the established religion regained lost ground after the Revolutionary Period in France. Acarie's mortal remains are in the chapel of the Carmelites of Pontoise. Her feast is celebrated on 18 April.

Evelyn Underhill regarded the vigorous and saintly Madame Acarie as providing the first definite impulsion towards that interior growth which made the exquisite and urbane Francis de Sales a fit guide for the soul of Jane Frances de Chantal.

== See also ==
- Margaret of the Blessed Sacrament - her daughter Marguerite
