= Order of the Incarnate Word and Blessed Sacrament =

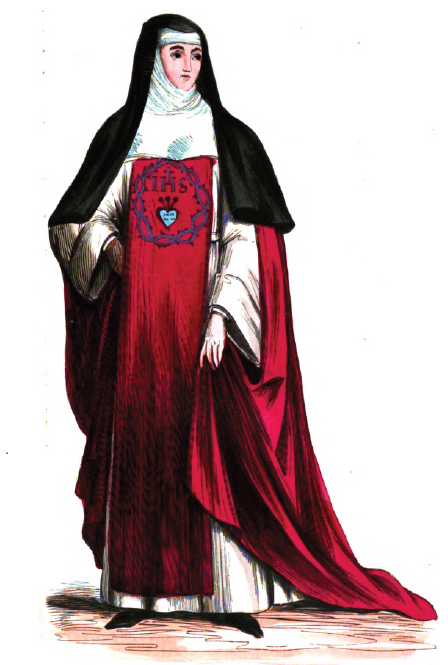
Habit of the Order of the Incarnate Word and Blessed Sacrament

The Order of the Incarnate Word and Blessed Sacrament is a Catholic religious order founded in the early part of the seventeenth century by Jeanne Chezard de Matel.

== History ==
The order was founded by Jeanne Chezard de Matel. Its principal object was the education of youth. The first house was founded at Lyon, France, foundations being subsequently established at Avignon, Paris, and various other places in France. The rule and constitutions of the order were approved in 1633 by Pope Urban VIII, and confirmed in 1644 by Innocent X. At the time of the French Revolution the religious were driven out of their monasteries, but after the restoration of peace, the order was re-established. It thence again spread it branches over many parts of France.

The sisters serve primarily through ministries of prayer, Christian education, and health care.

=== United States ===
In 1852, French-born Jean-Marie Odin, Bishop of Galveston, Texas visited France to obtain religious for his far-off mission. A group headed by St. Claire Valentine, left Lyon for the United States, and arrived in New Orleans in May, 1852. There they stayed temporarily with a Carmelite community there, before sailing to Galveston, Texas, where they received seven months of instruction in English and Spanish. From there they traveled on the troop ship Lone Star, to Point Isabel and on to Brownsville, arriving February 26, 1853. In time, eighteen more Sisters arrived from France, England, Mexico and Germany. In 1857 they were able to open a school for the poor. The Brownsville community operates the Villa Maria Language Institute.

In 1866 a second group, again led by Valentine, left Brownsville to establish a foundation in Victoria, Texas. After a few years, the house in Victoria sent out members to begin foundations at Corpus Christi, Houston, and Hallettsville. The Victoria community runs a retreat center at Amor Meus Spirituality Center.

In January, 1932, the communities of Brownsville and Corpus Christi were united, with the Motherhouse being in Corpus Christi.

The Houston Congregation of the Incarnate Word was founded in 1873, and Incarnate Word Academy was opened as a boarding school in January 1874. Although no longer taking boarders, IWA remains the oldest permanent Catholic School in the city of Houston.

In 1926, seven Irish-born Sisters of the Incarnate Word and Blessed Sacrament responded to the Bishop of Omaha's appeal for teachers. However, Nebraska allowed only American citizens to teach in their schools, so the sister were invited to Cleveland, Ohio by Joseph Schrembs, Bishop of Cleveland. Upon their arrival in May 1927, the Sisters of Charity of St. Augustine gave the sisters a home for several months. In September 1927, the sisters were asked by Schrembs to teach at Annunciation School in Brook Park. They opened Incarnate Word Academy on September 11, 1935.

=== Mexico ===
In 1903, sisters from Brownsville were sent to Ciudad Tula at the request of Filemón Fierro y Terán, Bishop of Tamaulipas. Upon his death shortly thereafter they move to Gómez Palacio, Durango. Six postulants joined them from Ireland. By 1914, during the Mexican Revolution, the community decided to leave the country, and move to the United States. They arrived first in Arkansas, and later on moved to Cuba, where they established several schools. In 1921 Mary of the Sacred Heart Hord returned to México with a number of sisters and established a convent in Gómez Palacio, Durango. Their school was closed during the time of the Cristero War, but was re-opened in 1932 as the Colegio Villa de Matel, Incorporado. The community continued to grow and in 1981, the Community of Tepehuanes, Durango was established.

== See also ==
- Sisters of Charity of the Incarnate Word
