= Pierre de Bérulle =

French Catholic priest and cardinal

His Eminence Pierre de Bérulle
- Cardinal-Priest of Santa Maria della Pace
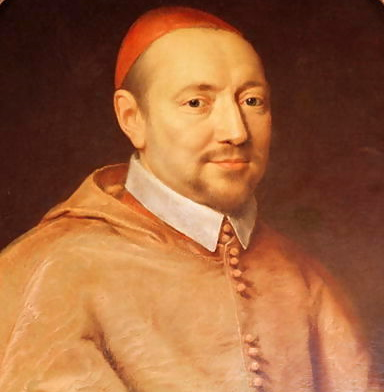
- Church: Catholic Church
- In office: 1633–1639
- Previous post: Cardinal-Priest of San Lorenzo in Panisperna (1627–1633)

Orders
- Ordination: 5 June 1599
- Created cardinal: 30 August 1627 by Pope Urban VIII
- Rank: Cardinal-Priest

Personal details
- Born: 4 February 1575 Cérilly, France
- Died: 2 October 1629 (aged 54) Paris, France
- Buried: Trinità dei Monti
- Education: University of Bologna

Pierre de Bérulle (French pronunciation: [pjɛʁ də beʁyl]; 4 February 1575 – 2 October 1629) was a French Catholic priest, cardinal and statesman in 17th-century France. He was the founder of the French school of spirituality and counted among his disciples Vincent de Paul and Francis de Sales, although both developed significantly different spiritual theologies. He was also founder of the Oratory of Jesus.

== Life ==
Bérulle was born in the Château of Cérilly, near Troyes in Champagne, into two families of distinguished magistrates on 4 February 1575. The château de Cérilly is situated in the modern department of Yonne, while the village adjacent to it, Bérulle, is in Aube. He was educated by the Jesuits at Clermont and at the Sorbonne in Paris. He published his first work, his Bref Discours de l'abnegation interieure, in 1597. Soon after his ordination as a priest in 1599, he assisted Cardinal Duperron in his public controversy with the Protestant Philippe de Mornay, and made numerous converts.

With the co-operation of his cousin, Madame Acarie (Marie of the Incarnation), in 1604 he introduced the Discalced Carmelite nuns of the reform of Teresa of Ávila into France.

In 1608, Vincent de Paul moved to Paris, where he came under the influence of Abbé (later Cardinal) Pierre de Bérulle, whom he took as his spiritual director for a time. De Bérulle was responsible for de Paul taking up an appointment to the parish of Clichy.

A mainstay of the Counter-Reformation in France, in 1611 Bérulle founded in Paris the Congregation of the French Oratory, on the model of the one founded in 1556 by Philip Neri at Rome. The French congregation, however, varied in important respects from the Italian Oratory.

== Statesman ==
Bérulle was a chaplain to King Henry IV of France, and several times declined his offers to be made a bishop. He obtained the necessary dispensations from Rome for Henrietta Maria's marriage to Charles I, and acted as her chaplain during the first year of her stay in England. In 1626, as French ambassador to Spain, he concluded the favourable Treaty of Monzón, to which his enemy Cardinal Richelieu found objections. After the reconciliation of King Louis XIII with his mother, Marie de Medici, through his agency, he was appointed a councillor of state, but had to resign this office, owing to his pro-Habsburg policy, which was opposed by Richelieu. For religious reasons, Cardinal Bérulle favored the allegiance of France with Austria and Spain, the other Catholic powers, while Cardinal Richelieu wanted to undermine their influence in Europe. He was made cardinal by Pope Urban VIII on 30 August 1627, but never received the red hat.

Bérulle died October 2, 1629, in Paris, while celebrating Mass, and was buried in the chapel of the Oratorian College of Juilly.

== French School of Spirituality ==
In the early part of his career, Bérulle was confident of the ability of the individual to both remake society and reform the church. Relying on human reason and diligent effort, he worked to convert the Huguenots through theological treatises and conferences. When his efforts seemed to have little effect, he came to the realisation that everything depended on God, and that one should attempt to live in accordance with the will of God without concern for success or failure.

Bérulle is generally regarded as being an initiator of the French School of Spirituality, a powerful spiritual, missionary, and reform movement that animated the church in France in the early seventeenth century. The movement was characterised by a deep sense of God's grandeur and of the Church as the Body of Christ, a pessimistic Augustinian view of man that nonetheless stressed positive potential through God, and a strong apostolic and missionary commitment. Cornelius Jansen and Jean du Vergier de Hauranne (the Abbé (Abbot) of Saint-Cyran), key collaborators of Bérulle, worked together to promote an Augustinian penitential theology, hoping that Bérulle’s Oratory would be the means by which the theology would displace that of "laxist" Jesuits.

Bérulle's depiction of the mystical journey through Mary to Christ, and through Christ to the Trinity is a hallmark of the French School of Spirituality.

It has been asserted that the term "school" is potentially problematic, though, because at least some other cited members of this "school," such as Jean Eudes, Jean-Jacques Olier, Louis-Marie Grignion de Montfort, and Jean-Baptiste de La Salle, do not simply develop the thought of Bérulle, but all have their own significant insights. It has, therefore, been asserted that the "school" does not have simply one founder. However, the many common elements (such as an emphasis on living in the Spirit of Jesus, particular forms of meditative prayer, and, in some measure, a spiritual theology of priesthood taught in seminaries influenced by French School since the 1600s), means that it can be considered as a distinct tradition of spirituality, more recently known as Berullism.

== Berullian Spiritual Theology of Priesthood ==
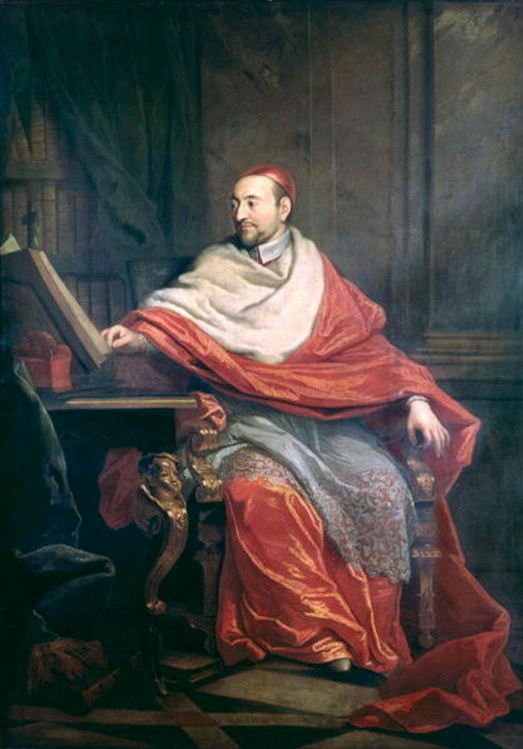
Cardinal Pierre de Bérulle

Substantial and polemicised Lutheran, Calvinist, and Counter-Reformation theological and philosophical notions have been noted in Berulle's spiritual theology of priesthood. This spiritual theology created a sea change in the Roman Catholic theology of the priesthood, principally through an over-identification with Christ, according to Clare McGrath-Merkle. Berullian clerical spirituality has been characterised by a negative spiritual anthropology of self-annihilationism and neantism in which the priest must lose his identity to make room for that of Christ.

== Philosophy and works ==
Bérulle encouraged Descartes' philosophical studies, and it was through him that the Samaritan Pentateuch, recently brought over from Constantinople, was inserted in Lejay's Bible Polyglotte (1628–45).

Bérulle has been claimed to be an opponent of the abstract school of mysticism that bypassed the humanity of Christ, although his own method of prayer included a focus on adoring the being of Christ himself, considered in the abstract; Pope Urban VIII called him the "apostle of the incarnate Word".

The Carmelite nuns who were brought to France by Bérulle objected to his attempts to influence their spirituality. Nevertheless, Berullian influences did remain within the spirituality of female Carmelite monastic communities and perdured into the 20th century, until Blessed Marie-Eugene OCD visited the communities to provide standard Carmelite spiritual formation.

In his Discours de l'état et des grandeurs de Jésus Bérulle emphasised Jesus as the Incarnate Word of God, and the abasement, self-surrender, servitude and humiliation— all Bérulle's words— of his Incarnation. He even took the Incarnation as the defining characteristic of his spirituality and his Oratory, when he asked Christ "that, in this piety, devotion, and special servitude to the mystery of Your Incarnation and of Your humanised divinity and deified humanity, be our life and our state, our spirit and our particular difference."

The chief works of Cardinal de Bérulle are:

- Bref discours de l'abnégation intérieure (Brief Discourse on Interior Abnegation), (1597).
- Traité des énergumènes (Treatise on the Possessed), (Troyes, 1599). (This addresses the nature of diabolical possession, a topic of much controversy at the time. Diabolical possession, Bérulle argued, consists "precisely in a right which the malign spirit has of residing in [the possessed person's] body and of altering it in some manner." At its heart lay the profound diabolical hostility to the Incarnation, such that Satan, through possession, attempts to ape God, becoming "incarnate" himself.)
- Trois Discours de controverse (Three Discourses of Controversy), (Paris, 1609), on various subjects.
- Discours de l'état et des grandeurs de Jésus (Discourse on the State and Grandeurs of Jesus), (Paris, 1623). This work was reprinted several times; the substance and often the actual expressions are to be found in the diffuse Méditations of Father Bourgoing and also in Bossuet's Elévations sur les mystères. The work was also popular among Jansenists. Translated as Discourses on the State and Grandeurs of Jesus: The Ineffable Union of the Deity with Humanity, trans. Lisa Richmond (Washington, D.C.: Catholic University of America Press, 2023).
- Vie de Jésus (Life of Jesus), (Paris, 1629). This was a sequel to the preceding work, which the author left unfinished at the time of his death, having only had the time to consider the mystery of the Annunciation and partially (in a draft) the Visitation.
- Elévation à Jésus-Christ sur Sainte Madeleine (Elevation to Jesus Christ Regarding St. [Mary] Magdalene), (Paris, 1627).

In addition, Bérulle wrote a number of short devotional works (Œuvres de pieté) and documents for the guidance of the Oratory.

Bérulle's works, edited by P. Bourgoing (2 vols., 1644) were reprinted, by Migne in 1857.

A selected modern English translation is available as Bérulle and the French School: Selected Writings, trans. Lowell M Glendon, (New York: Paulist Press, 1989).
