= Jeanne Chezard de Matel =

French mystic

Venerable Jeanne Chézard de Matel OVISS
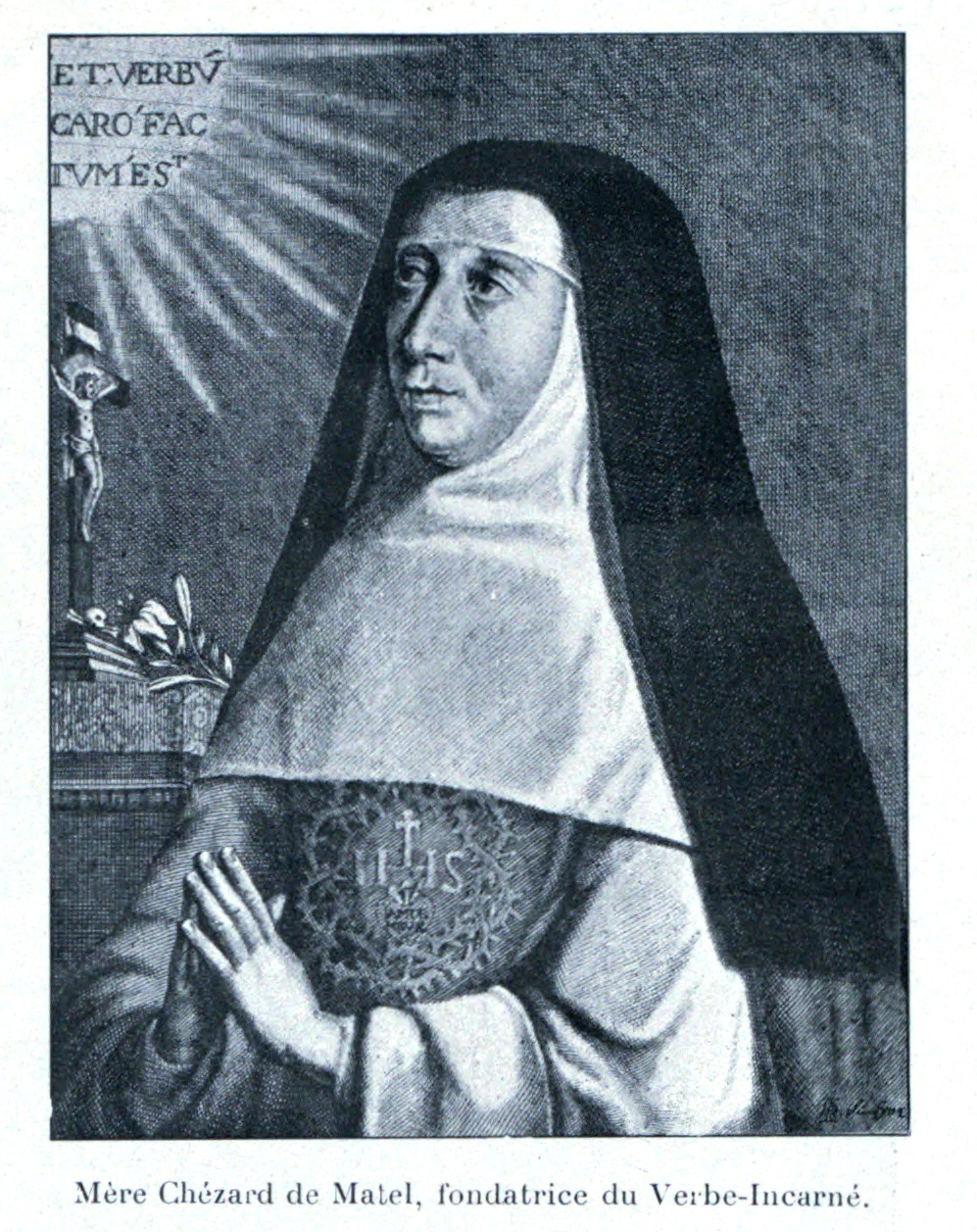

Foundress of the Order of the Incarnate Word and Blessed Sacrament
- Born: November 6, 1596; Roanne, France
- Died: September 11, 1670 (aged 73); Paris, France
- Venerated in: Catholic Church

Jeanne Chézard de Matel, OVISS (November 6, 1596 – September 11, 1670) was a French Catholic mystic who founded the Order of the Incarnate Word and Blessed Sacrament, whose rule and constitution were approved in 1633 with the principal objective of youth education.

== Life ==
Matel was born on November 6, 1596, in Roanne, in the Diocese of Lyon, in France. She was the daughter of Jean Chézard, a French army officer and nobleman, and his wife, Jeanne Chaurier, whose first four children were stillborn or had died as infants. Matel was baptized the same day in St. Stephen's Church. Two small children who came to the door begging were her godparents. As she grew in her spirituality, she was drawn especially to Mary, the Mother of the Incarnate Word, to St. Joseph and to Michael the Archangel.

In 1608, at the age of 12, Matel was permitted to make her first Communion. In her teens she lived an active social life, loving parties, dancing, fun and laughter. In 1616, her father wanted her to marry, but Jeanne felt that God was calling her to religious life, but she was not clear. At one time, she thought she had a Carmelite vocation, and she later considered joining the Ursulines. It also appears from her writings that she pondered becoming a member of the Visitation and Franciscan orders. During her twenties, she spent six years trying to discern her vocation. Matel was endowed with the gift of infused contemplation and had vivid experiences of God’s presence.

On July 2, 1625, at age twenty-nine, guided by her spiritual directors, Matel began the work of founding the Order of the Incarnate Word and Blessed Sacrament with two companions in Roanne, but soon moved to Lyon. At the early stages, she thought of naming the Order after the Lamb of God, whose peace would bring about “a gentle, peaceful relationship between God and our soul.” Yet in prayer and discernment, Jesus is said to have revealed to her that the name of the Order was to be only “Incarnate Word, for in this is expressed all of who I am.”

Monseigneur de Miron, the Archbishop of Lyon, died unexpectedly after having occupied the archepiscopal See for only two years. His successor, Cardinal Alphonse-Louis du Plessis de Richelieu, brother of the famous Prime Minister under Louis XIII, maintained an unwavering opposition to Matel's foundation. Confronted with the dispositions of the new archbishop, Matel's situation became both difficult and critical. Many women joined Jeanne with a desire to live a religious life. During these years Jeanne sought consent to found the Order in Roanne, Lyon, and Paris. While waiting for church approval to establish the new group as an order, the community established boarding schools for girls.

Throughout her life, both personally and as a foundress, Matel encountered opposition, criticism, and other difficulties. She even delayed fulfilling her desire to take the habit and take religious vows to establish the Order. It was only on her deathbed that Matel's desire was realized. Against all odds, Matel received the habit of the order she had founded and made her religious profession, a few hours before her death in the early morning of September 11, 1670.

== Sisters of the Incarnate Word ==
Matel established four foundations of the Order in France: Avignon (1639); Grenoble (1643); Paris (1644); and Lyon (1655). Additional monasteries were established at Anduze (1697) and Roquemaure (1697). During the French Revolution the Incarnate Word houses shared the fate of all religious houses throughout the country, and were suppressed by the Decree of 1790.

The sisters who survived persecution were dispersed. Many struggled to remain faithful to their commitment to the Incarnate Word, protecting the relics and writings of Jeanne, and the other guiding documents of their Order. In 1817 the Order was re-established in the village of Azerables, France.

On March 23, 1852, responding to the request from Bishop Odin of Texas, Sr. Claire Valentine, Sr. Ange Barre, Sr. Dominic Ravier and Sr. Ephrem Satin traveled from Lyon to Texas to serve in the field of education. After a 3-month voyage and 7 months in Galveston learning English and Spanish, the Sisters landed at then Point Isabel in the middle of January, 1853, and traveled to Brownsville. Houses were also founded in Cleveland, Ohio and Mexico. The Order helped establish another Order, the Sisters of Charity of the Incarnate Word.

== Veneration ==
Matel's sainthood cause was opened after her death. On March 7, 1992, Pope John Paul II declared that she had lived a life of heroic sanctity and accorded her the title Venerable.

== Legacy ==
The Sisters of the Incarnate Word and Blessed Sacrament of Victoria, Texas, along with Sister Congregations in Corpus Christi, Texas and Houston, Texas, and Cleveland, Ohio, and with many sisters in Mexico, now serve in the Americas, Europe, and Africa. They serve primarily through ministries of prayer, Christian education, and health care, according to the needs of the Church today.

The Blessed Sacrament Academy is located in San Antonio, Texas.

Matel is referenced frequently in the novel The Cathedral by Joris-Karl Huysmans where the central character, Durtal, contemplates writing her biography.

== See also ==
- Order of the Incarnate Word and Blessed Sacrament
