= Winstanley (film) =

- Directed by: Kevin Brownlow; Andrew Mollo
- Written by: David Caute (novel); Kevin Brownlow
- Produced by: Andrew Mollo; Kevin Brownlow
- Starring: Miles Halliwell
- Cinematography: Ernest Vincze
- Edited by: Sarah Ellis
- Music by: Sergei Prokofiev
- Production company: British Film Institute Production Board
- Release date: 1975
- Running time: 95 minutes
- Country: United Kingdom
- Language: English

Winstanley is a 1975 British black-and-white film directed by Kevin Brownlow and Andrew Mollo and starring Miles Halliwell and Terry Higgins. It was written by David Caute and Brownlow based on Caute's 1961 novel Comrade Jacob. It was produced by the British Film Institute Production Board, and is about social reformer and writer Gerrard Winstanley.

== Plot ==
The film details the story of the 17th-century social reformer and writer Gerrard Winstanley, who, along with a small band of followers known as the Diggers, tried to establish a self-sufficient farming community on common land at St George's Hill ("Diggers' Hill") near Cobham, Surrey. The community was one of the world's first small-scale experiments in socialism or communism, and its ideas were copied elsewhere in England during the time of the Protectorate of Oliver Cromwell, but it was quickly suppressed, and in the end left only a legacy of ideas to inspire later generations of socialist theorists.

== Cast ==
- Miles Halliwell as Gerrard Winstanley
- Terry Higgins as Tom Haydon
- Jerome Willis as Lord General Fairfax
- Phil Oliver as Will Everard
- David Bramley as Parson Platt
- Alison Halliwell as Mrs. Platt
- Dawson France as Captain Gladman
- Bill Petch as Henry Bickerstaffe
- Barry Shaw as Colonel Rich
- Sid Rawle as Ranter
- George Hawkins as John Coulton
- Stanley Reed as Recorder
- Philip Stearns as Francis Drake
- Flora Skrine as Mrs. Drake

== Production ==
Armour used was real armour from the 1640s, borrowed from the Tower of London. Real-life activist Sid Rawle played a Ranter (i.e. a member of one or other of several English Revolution-period anarchist-type groups).

== Reception ==
In The Monthly Film Bulletin Tom Milne wrote: "What makes the film difficult (apparently) is its elliptical approach to narrative, with cause and effect implied rather than stated, so that despite all the action and reaction, the overall impression is a sense of total stasis in which the precise historical moment for Utopia is allowed to pass."

== Home media ==
The film was reissued on DVD and Blu-ray in 2009 by the British Film Institute (BFI), which had funded the original project.
