= Robert Everard =

Robert Everard (fl. c. 1657) was an English soldier who fought for the Parliamentary cause during the English Civil War and was a religious controversialist. He promoted Baptist views, Socinianism and Arianism; and in later years declared himself a Roman Catholic convert.

== Identity ==
Beyond the facts known from the controversial literature, his identity is still a somewhat confused matter, depending on the credibility of the sources. Christopher Hill points to the possibility of charlatanry involved in some of the events of the 1640s, picking up comments of John Pordage. Pordage was (on his own account) in contact with Robert Everard for a couple of months in late 1649, which were filled with impressive conjuring tricks or illusions, and saw him experience a breakdown leaving him in Bridewell Hospital. Hill also comments on the generic nature of the conversion narrative of the pamphlet in which Everard's Catholicism was announced, and its lack of historical foundation. Richard Baxter, who theorised that the Independents were a Catholic conspiracy, found in Everard a possible example of his theory, that Independents might be crypto-Catholics.

It has been suggested by Hill that this Robert Everard may coincide with the William Everard who was a leader of the Diggers. Some references in the literature, if Robert and William are different people, may have confused the two. Hill in an earlier book gives an example, relating to an Everard who was a guest of Roger Crab. William Everard's career as a Digger leader, with Gerrard Winstanley, was quite short, beginning on 1 April 1649 at a hill in Walton-on-Thames. He was an ex-soldier, and also a sometime Leveller. William Poole comments that the identities of Robert and William Everard were confused by their contemporaries. Hill's suggestion does not have wide support.

Another point is whether this Robert Everard was the same figure as the person of that name, Robert Everard the Agitator (New Agent), involved in the 1647 Putney Debates, and a signatory of the Agreement of the People (October 28). Here contemporary scholarship largely does make the connection. Nigel Smith in speaking of the "General Baptist and Leveller" identifies the two. The Leveller was a Trooper (called Buff-Coat while he remained anonymous) of the Lieutenant-General's Regiment, while the controversialist claimed an army rank of Captain (and was so identified by Pordage). The Oxford Dictionary of National Biography also identifies the two; William Everard has a separate article there.

== Works ==
Publications by Robert Everard include:

- Baby-baptism Routed, London, 1650. This elicited a reply from Nathaniel Stephens (supported by John Bryan and Obadiah Grew); whose work was then criticised by John Tombes in his Antipaedobaptism.
- Nature's Vindication; or a check to all those who affirm Nature to be Vile, Wicked, Corrupt, and Sinful, London 1652.
- Three questions propounded to B. Morley about his practice of Laying on of Hands, Lond. n. d. This led to a controversy between Everard, Benjamin Morley, and T. Morris, a baptist.
- The Creation and the Fall of Man, London, no date. Nathaniel Stephens, a presbyterian preacher, replied to this in Vindiciae Fundamenti; or a Threefold Defence of the Doctrine of Original Sin, 1658. Everard's work, commentary on the Book of Genesis, is dated to 1649, when Everard was active in Leicestershire.
- An Epistle to the several Congregations of the Non-Conformists [Lond. ?], 2nd edit. 1664. In this work the author states the reason of his conversion to the Catholic Church. Replies to it were published by 'J. I.,' Matthew Poole, and Francis Howgill.
