= Peter Suschitzky =

British cinematographer and photographer

Peter Suschitzky ASC
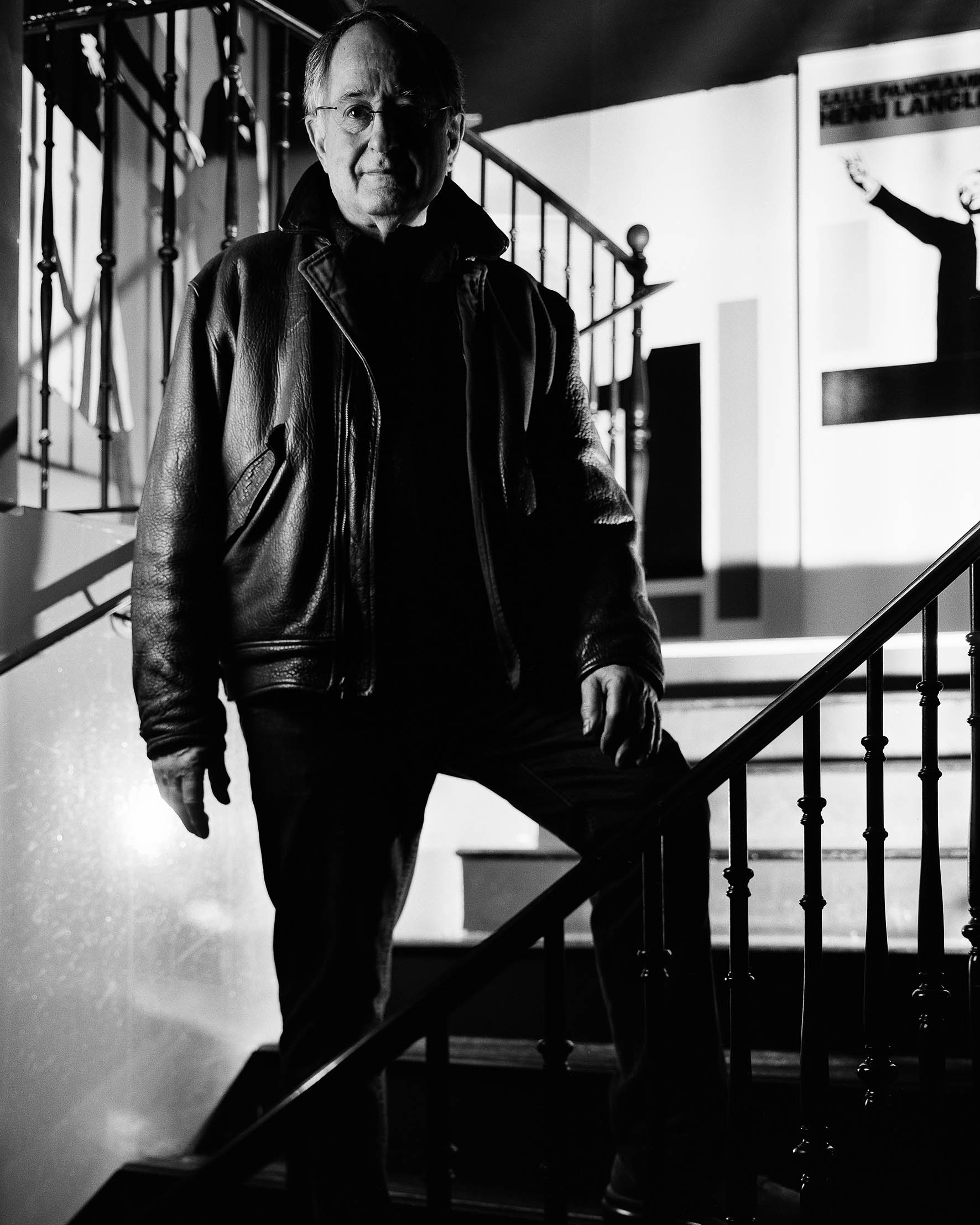
- Peter Suschitzky at Louis Lumière's ciné-club in January 2018
- Born: 25 July 1941 (age 85); London, England
- Years active: 1966–2020
- Organization: American Society of Cinematographers
- Parents: Wolfgang Suschitzky (father); Ilona Donath (mother)
- Website: http://petersuschitzky.com

Peter Suschitzky, ASC (born 25 July 1941) is an English retired cinematographer and photographer. He is best known for his long-running collaboration with David Cronenberg, as his principal director of photography between 1988 and 2014. He also worked with directors such as Peter Watkins, Ken Russell, Jim Sharman, and Tim Burton.

Suschitzky was nominated for a BAFTA Award for Best Cinematography for his work on Russell's Valentino (1977). He won the Genie Award for Best Cinematography four times, all for films directed by Cronenberg. His other notable films include It Happened Here (1964), The War Game (1966), The Rocky Horror Picture Show (1975), The Empire Strikes Back (1980), Mars Attacks! (1996), and Tale of Tales (2015).

== Early life and education ==
Suschitzky was born in London in 1941. His Austrian Jewish father was the BAFTA-nominated cinematographer and photographer Wolfgang Suschitzky. The elder Suschitzky had emigrated from Vienna to Britain in the mid-1930s. Peter has two siblings, including classical musician Misha Donat.

Although music was Peter's passion, he chose to pursue a career in cinematography while studying at Institut des hautes études cinématographiques in Paris, France. He became a clapper boy at the age of 19 and a camera operator at the age of 22.

== Career ==
Among his first films as DP was It Happened Here, a mockumentary-style World War II film about life in the United Kingdom, following a hypothetical Axis victory in World War II. The film was shot on handheld, 16mm film in order to give it a gritty, realistic look inspired by wartime newsreels. Due to the film's independent nature and unusual subject matter, its production lasted a total of eight years.

In 1975, Suschitzky shot The Rocky Horror Picture Show, a comedy musical film that, while initially unsuccessful, has since become a massive cult film, with regular midnight screenings attended by dedicated, cosplaying fans. He shot the 1977 biopic Valentino for director Ken Russell, for which he received a nomination for a BAFTA Film Award for Best Cinematography. Three years later, he would lens the second entry in the long-running Star Wars film series, The Empire Strikes Back, widely considered to be the best in the series.

Suschitzky succeeded Mark Irwin as David Cronenberg's regular director of photography after Irwin left Dead Ringers during pre-production. Their collaboration lasted until 2014, with Maps to the Stars, with Douglas Koch succeeding Suschitzky as Cronenberg's regular in 2022.

Suschitzky is featured in the book Conversations with Cinematographers, published by Scarecrow Press.

== Filmography ==
=== Feature film ===
Year	Title	Director	Notes
1964	It Happened Here	Kevin Brownlow; Andrew Mollo	With Kevin Brownlow
1966	The Christmas Tree	Jim Clark	
1967	Privilege	Peter Watkins	
1967	Charlie Bubbles	Albert Finney	
1968	A Midsummer Night's Dream	Peter Hall	
1969	Lock Up Your Daughters!	Peter Coe	
1969	The Gladiators	Peter Watkins	
1969	A Touch of Love	Waris Hussein	
1970	Leo the Last	John Boorman	
1970	Figures in a Landscape	Joseph Losey	With Henri Alekan and Guy Tabary
1971	Melody	Waris Hussein	
1972	The Pied Piper	Jacques Demy	
1972	Henry VIII and his Six Wives	Waris Hussein	
1973	That'll Be the Day	Claude Whatham	
1975	All Creatures Great and Small	Claude Whatham	
1975	The Rocky Horror Picture Show	Jim Sharman	
1975	Lisztomania	Ken Russell	
1977	Valentino	Ken Russell	
1980	The Empire Strikes Back	Irvin Kershner	
1983	Krull	Peter Yates	
1984	Falling in Love	Ulu Grosbard	
1988	In Extremis	Olivier Lorsac	
1988	Dead Ringers	David Cronenberg	1st collaboration with Cronenberg
1990	Where the Heart Is	John Boorman	
1991	Un homme et deux femmes	Valérie Stroh	
1991	Naked Lunch	David Cronenberg	
1992	The Public Eye	Howard Franklin	
1993	The Vanishing	George Sluizer	
1993	M. Butterfly	David Cronenberg	
1994	Immortal Beloved	Bernard Rose	
1996	Mars Attacks!	Tim Burton	
1996	Crash	David Cronenberg	
1998	The Man in the Iron Mask	Randall Wallace	
1999	eXistenZ	David Cronenberg	
2000	Red Planet	Antony Hoffman	
2002	Spider	David Cronenberg	
2005	A History of Violence	David Cronenberg	
2005	Shopgirl	Anand Tucker	
2006	The Stone Council	Guillaume Nicloux	
2007	Eastern Promises	David Cronenberg	
2011	A Dangerous Method	David Cronenberg	
2012	Cosmopolis	David Cronenberg	
2013	After Earth	M. Night Shyamalan	
2014	Maps to the Stars	David Cronenberg	
2015	Tale of Tales	Matteo Garrone	

=== Television ===
Year	Title	Director	Notes
1961	Mächte des Glaubens	Peter von Zahn	Episode "Das Judentum"
1993	Fallen Angels	Tom Hanks; Tom Cruise	Episodes "I'll Be Waiting" and "The Frightening Frammis"

TV movies

Year	Title	Director	Notes
1966	The War Game	Peter Watkins	Uncredited
1966	Francis Bacon Fragments of a Portrait	Michael Gill	Documentary film

== Awards and recognition ==
Award	Year	Category	Title	Result
BAFTA Award	1977	Best Cinematography	Valentino	Nominated
Genie Award	1988	Best Cinematography	Dead Ringers	Won
Genie Award	1991	Best Cinematography	Naked Lunch	Won
Genie Award	1996	Best Cinematography	Crash	Won
Genie Award	2007	Best Cinematography	Eastern Promises	Won
Nastro d'Argento	2015	Best Cinematography	Tale of Tales	Won

In 2015 he was selected to be a member of the jury for the Critics' Week section of the 2015 Cannes Film Festival.
