= Nathaniel Stephens (priest) =

English clergyman ejected for nonconformity

Nathaniel Stephens (c.1606–1678) was an English clergyman ejected for nonconformity in 1662, who is now best known for his part in the early life of George Fox. He was a controversialist in the Presbyterian interest, engaging also with Baptists, and with Gerrard Winstanley, the universalist. In print he was a moderate, fair by the standards of his time to his opponents, and not bringing rancour to discussion of Catholicism.

== Life ==
He was son of Richard Stephens, vicar from 1604 of Stanton St Bernard, Wiltshire, and was born about 1606. On 14 March 1623, at the age of sixteen, he entered Magdalen Hall, Oxford, as a batler (poor scholar), graduating B.A. 14 February 1626, M.A. 25 June 1628.

On leaving the university he was curate at Fenny Drayton, Leicestershire, of which Robert Mason was rector. He probably was in sole charge from 1638. Driven from Drayton by the outbreak of the war in 1642, he took refuge in Coventry, where he subscribed the Solemn League and Covenant and became morning preacher at St. Michael's. He returned to Drayton in 1645, and had among his hearers George Fox. Stephens thought highly of Fox, discussed religion with him, and preached on the topics of their discourse, a proceeding which made Fox dislike his pastor. In 1649, while Stephens was conducting a lecture at Market Bosworth, Fox interposed, Stephens cried out that he was mad, and Fox, stoned out of the town by a rabble, set down the "deceitful priest" as his "great persecutor". A discussion between them at Drayton in 1654 is narrated in Fox's Journal "Neighbours": said Stephens, "George Fox is come to the light of the sun, and now he thinks to put out my starlight."

In 1659 Stephens was presented by Colonel William Purefoy to the rectory of Drayton, which he held till 1662, when he resigned under the Uniformity Act 1662. He continued to preach privately, but his services were often interrupted. Having seven times been driven from Drayton, he at length removed to Stoke Golding, three miles off, and preached there till lameness confined him to his chair. His studies made him absent-minded, but he was not wanting in a playful humour. He was buried on 24 February 1678 in the churchyard of Stoke Golding.

== Works ==
His chief work (1656), on the Apocalypse, is notable for its rejection of speculations. His exegesis is praised and generally followed by Matthew Poole in the fifth volume (1676) of his Synopsis Criticorum.

He published:

- A Precept for the Baptisme of Infants . . . vindicated . . . from . . . Mr. Robert Everard, 1651 (preface by John Bryan and Obadiah Grew).
- A Plain and Easie Calculation of the Name ... of the Beast, 1656 (preface by Edmund Calamy the Elder).
- Vindiciae Fundamenti, or a threefold defence of the Doctrine of Original Sin, 1658 (against the Arminian positions of Everard, Jeremy Taylor, and others).

Calamy gives a specimen of his unpublished notes on the Apocalypse, used by Poole, and afterwards in the possession of Sir Charles Wolseley.
