= English Revolution =

Term used by historians to describe various 17th-century episodes in English history

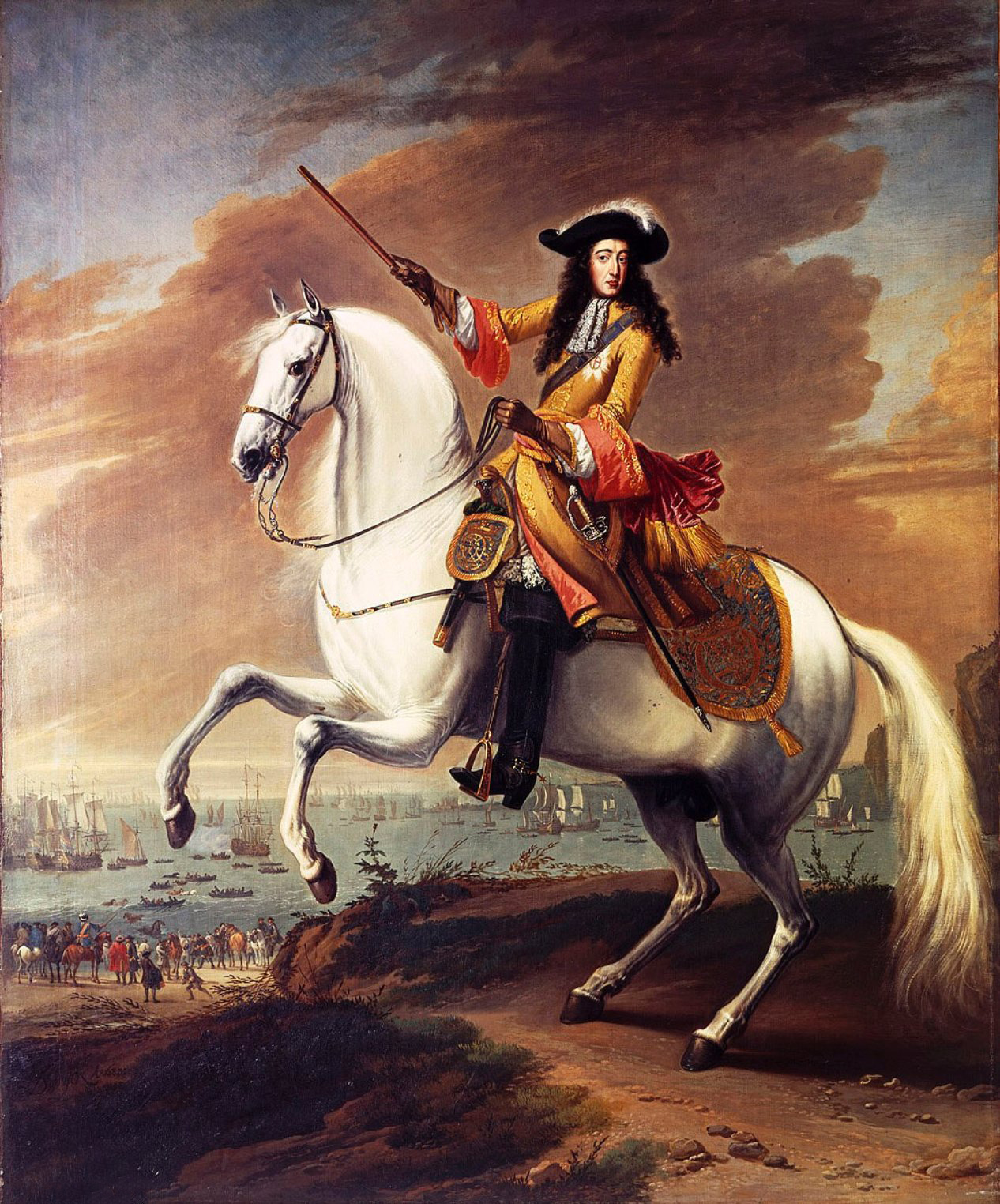
William III by Jan Wyck, commemorating the landing at Brixham, Torbay, 5 November 1688

The English Revolution is a term that has been used to describe two separate events in English history. Prior to the 20th century, it was generally applied to the 1688 Glorious Revolution, when James II was deposed and a constitutional monarchy established under William III and Mary II.

However, Marxist historians began using it for the period covering the 1639–1653 Wars of the Three Kingdoms and the Interregnum that followed the Execution of Charles I in 1649, before the 1660 Stuart Restoration had returned Charles II to the throne. Writing in 1892, Friedrich Engels described this period as "the Great Rebellion" and the Glorious Revolution of 1688 as "comparatively puny", although he claimed that both were part of the same revolutionary movement.

Although Charles II was retroactively declared to have been the legal and rightful monarch since the death of his father in 1649, which resulted in a return to the status quo in many areas, a number of gains made under the Commonwealth remained in law.

== Whig theory ==
Tensions regarding the English monarchy began well before the Revolution of 1688. When Charles I was executed in 1649 by the English Parliament, England entered into a republic, or Commonwealth, that lasted until Charles II was reestablished as king of England in 1660. The intermittent civil wars that lasted between 1649 and 1688 were a "constitutional struggle originating from the unresolved contradictions fostered by the Reformation". Debates amongst England's post-Reformation state and the constitutional basis for civil involvement in ecclesiastical and governmental issues continually converged together. During the Revolution of 1688, King James II was replaced by the monarchs William III and Mary II, and a constitutional monarchy was established that was described by Whig historians as the "English Revolution". That interpretation suggests that the "English Revolution" was the final act in the long process of reform and consolidation by Parliament to achieve a balanced constitutional monarchy in Britain, with laws made that pointed towards freedom.

== Marxist theory ==
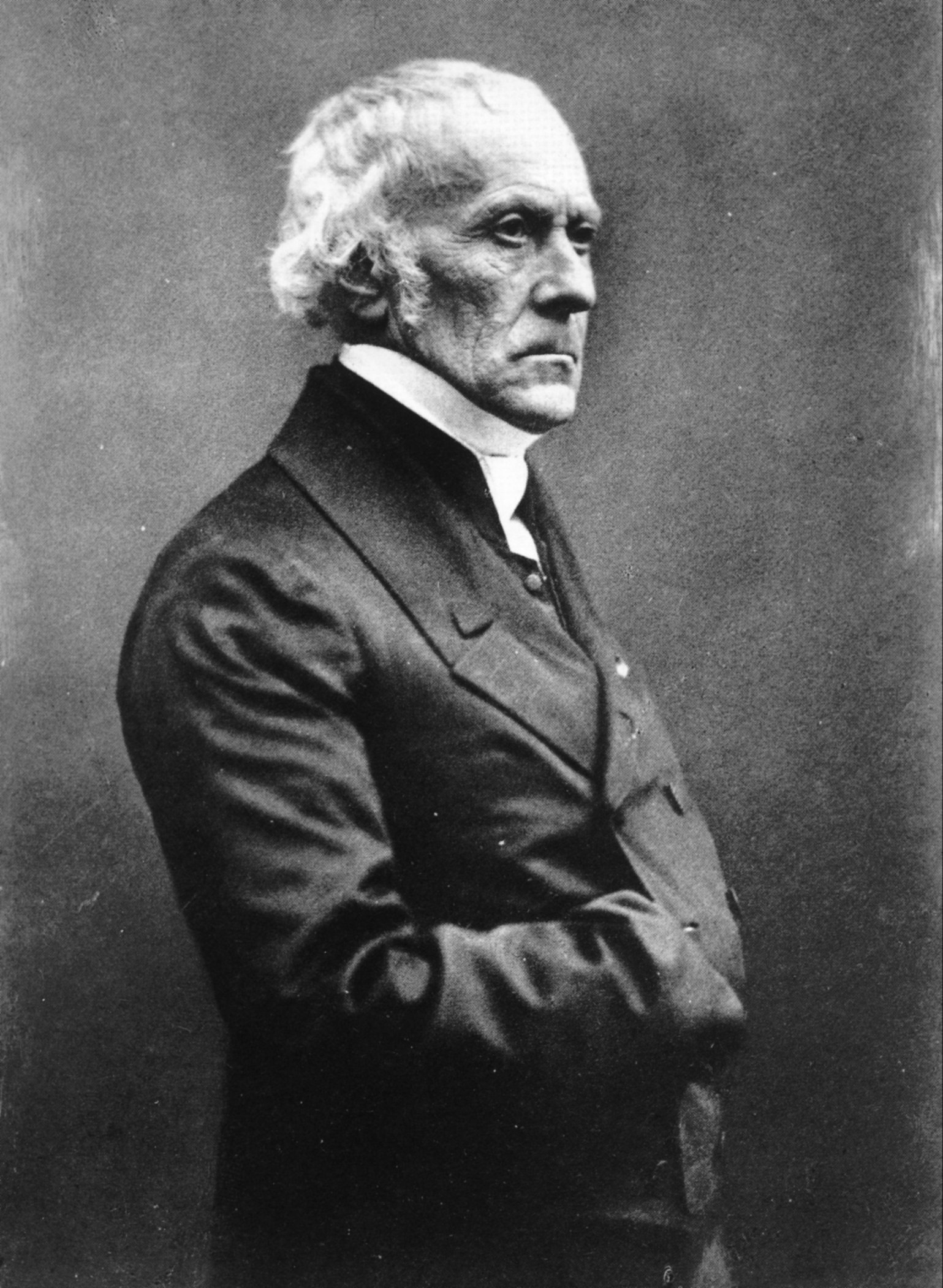
François Guizot

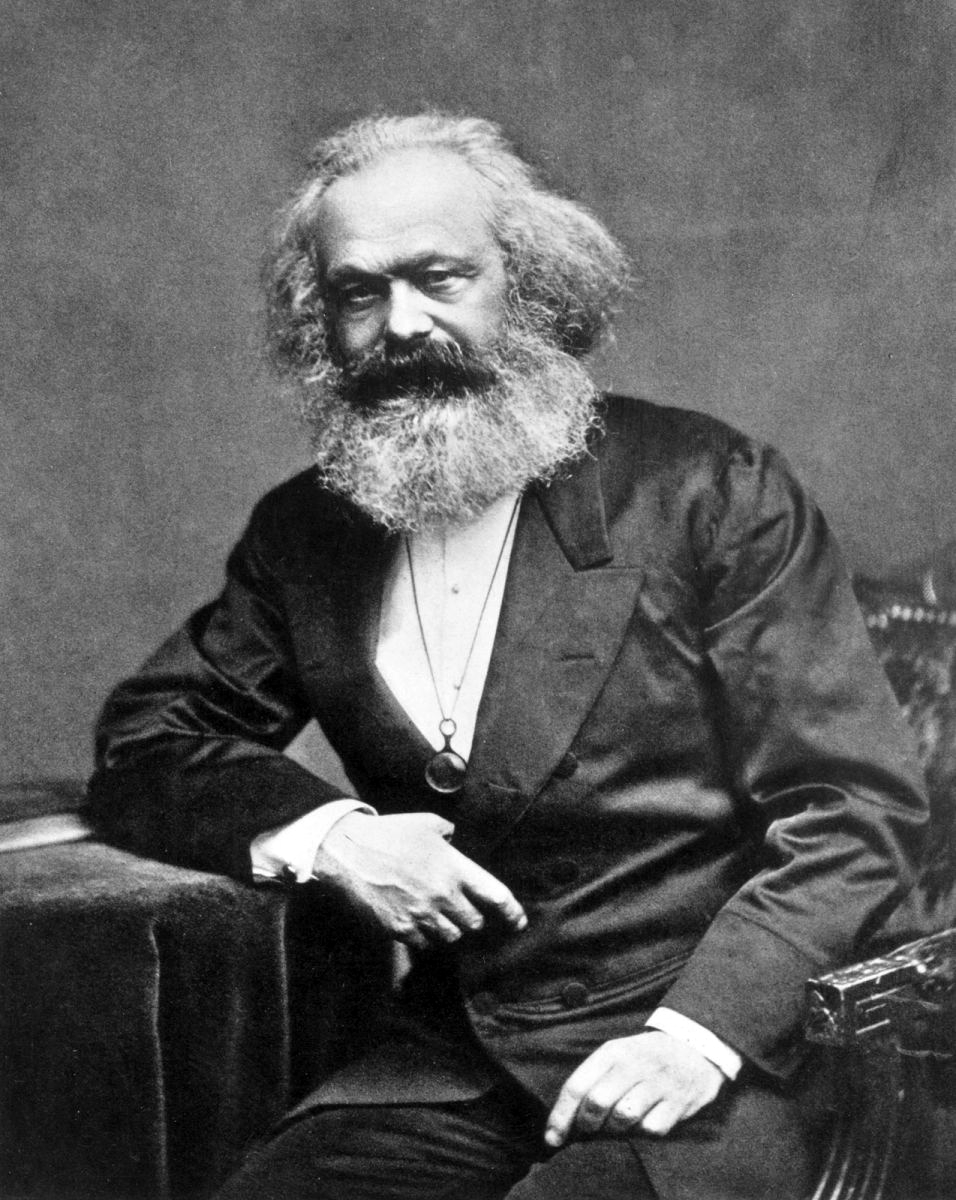
Karl Marx

The Marxist view of the English Revolution suggests that the events of 1640 to 1660 in Britain were a bourgeois revolution in which the final section of English feudalism (the state) was destroyed by a bourgeois class (and its supporters) and replaced with a state (and society), which reflected the wider establishment of agrarian (and later industrial) capitalism. Such an analysis sees the English Revolution as pivotal in the transition from feudalism to capitalism and from a feudal state to a capitalist state in Britain.

The phrase "English Revolution" was first used by Marx in the short text "England's 17th Century Revolution", a response to a pamphlet on the Glorious Revolution of 1688 by François Guizot. Oliver Cromwell and the English Civil War are also referred to multiple times in the work The Eighteenth Brumaire of Louis Bonaparte, but the event is not directly referred to by the name. By 1892, Engels was using the term "The Great Rebellion" for the conflict, and, while still recognising it as part of the same revolutionary event, dismissed the Glorious Revolution of 1688 as "comparatively puny".

According to the Marxist historian Christopher Hill:

The Civil War was a class war, in which the despotism of Charles I was defended by the reactionary forces of the established Church and conservative landlords, and on the other side stood the trading and industrial classes in town and countryside ... the yeomen and progressive gentry, and ... wider masses of the population whenever they were able by free discussion to understand what the struggle was really about.

Later developments of the Marxist view moved on from the theory of bourgeois revolution to suggest that the English Revolution anticipated the French Revolution and later revolutions in the field of popular administrative and economic gains. Along with the expansion of parliamentary power, the English Revolution broke down many of the old power relations in both rural and urban English society. The guild democracy movement of the period won its greatest successes among London's transport workers, most notably the Thames Watermen, who democratized their company in 1641–1643. With the outbreak of civil war in 1642, rural communities began to seize timber and other resources on the estates of royalists, Catholics, the royal family and the church hierarchy. Some communities improved their conditions of tenure on such estates.

The old status quo began a retrenchment after the end of the main civil war in 1646, and more especially after the restoration of the monarchy in 1660, but some gains endured in the long term. The democratic element introduced in the watermen's company in 1642, for example, survived, with vicissitudes, until 1827.

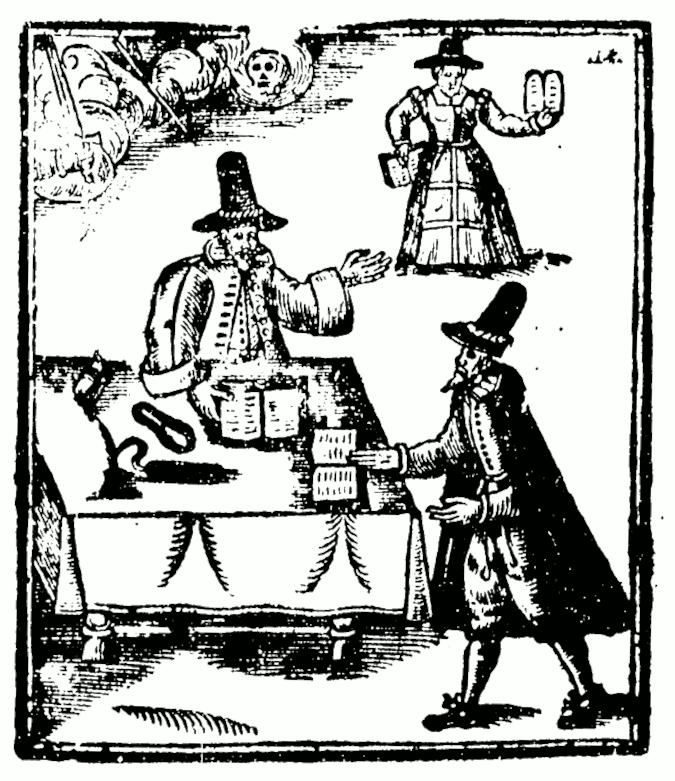
Illustration from the 1649 title page of The Declaration and Standard of the Levellers of England by William Everard

The Marxist view also developed a concept of a "Revolution within the Revolution" (pursued by Hill, Brian Manning and others), which placed a greater deal of emphasis on the radical movements of the period (such as the agitator Levellers, mutineers in the New Model Army and the Diggers), who attempted to go further than Parliament in the aftermath of the Civil War.

There were, we may oversimplify, two revolutions in mid-seventeenth-century England. The one which succeeded established the sacred rights of property (abolition of feudal tenures, no arbitrary taxation), gave political power to the propertied (sovereignty of Parliament and common law, abolition of prerogative courts), and removed all impediments to the triumph of the ideology of the men of property – the protestant ethic. There was, however, another revolution that never happened, though from time to time it threatened. This might have established communal property, a far wider democracy in political and legal institutions, might have disestablished the state church, and rejected the Protestant ethic.

Brian Manning claimed:

The old ruling class came back with new ideas and new outlooks which were attuned to economic growth and expansion and facilitated, in the long run, the development of a fully capitalist economy. It would all have been very different if Charles I had not been obliged to summon that Parliament to meet at Westminster on November 3rd, 1640.

=== Criticism ===
The idea, while popular among Marxist historians, has been criticised by many historians of more liberal schools, and of revisionist schools.

The notion that the events of 1640 to 1660 constitute an English Revolution has been criticized by historians such as Austin Woolrych, who pointed out that

painstaking research in the county after county, in local record offices, and family archives, has revealed that the changes in the ownership of the real estate, and hence in the composition of the governing class, were nothing like as great as used to be thought.

Woolrych argues that the notion that the period constitutes an "English Revolution" not only ignores the lack of significant social change contained within the period but also ignores the long-term trends of the early modern period which extend beyond this narrow time frame.

Neither Karl Marx nor Friedrich Engels ever ignored the further development of the bourgeois state beyond that point, however, as is clear from their writings on the Industrial Revolution.

== Other uses ==
The term "English Revolution" is also used by non-Marxists in the Victorian period to refer to 1642 such as the critic and writer Matthew Arnold in The Function of Criticism at the Present Time: "This is what distinguishes it [the French Revolution] from the English Revolution of Charles the First's time".
