= The Law of Freedom in a Platform =

Book by Gerrard Winstanley

The Law of Freedom in a Platform, or True Magistracy Restored
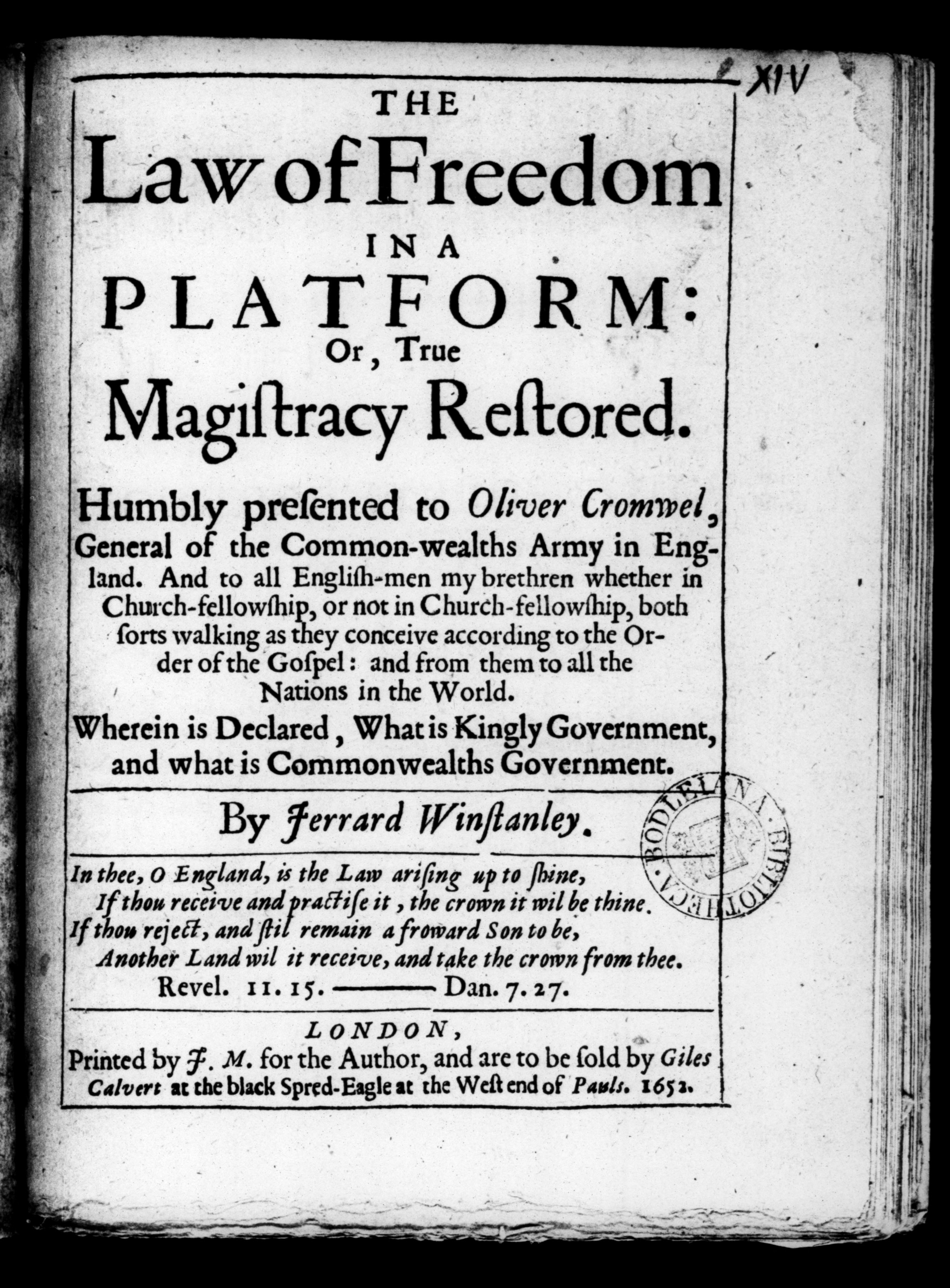
- Author: Gerrard Winstanley
- Language: English
- Subject: Communism, radicalism, republicanism
- Genre: Political philosophy
- Published: 20 February 1652
- Publisher: George Horton, Daniel Border
- Publication place: England
- OCLC: 838695892
- Preceded by: The New Law of Righteousness
- Text: The Law of Freedom in a Platform, or True Magistracy Restored at Wikisource

The Law of Freedom in a Platform, or True Magistracy Restored is a six-chapter book (described in the English of the time as a 'pamphlet') published in 1652 by the English religious reformer Gerrard Winstanley, a participant in the Diggers movement. In the book he argued that, under a Christian basis for society, private property should be abolished. In keeping with Winstanley's adherence to biblical models, the tract envisages a communist society, establishing the beginnings of modern Christian socialism.

The book is dedicated to Oliver Cromwell, whom Winstanley hope to persuade on his proposals for a new government. On 21 April 1652, Cromwell read a censored version of the text and reportedly sympathised with some of the proposed reforms. Winstanley argues in the book that the fall of monarchy is inevitable, citing as his evidence passages concerning the Fall of Babylon in the Book of Daniel and the Book of Revelation.

In the book, Winstanley proposed a system of collective labour. Overseers would ensure that everybody would complete their share of the tasks. The refusal of work would be punished by a loss of civil right for those who refuse to work, and by impressing these dissidents into forced labour.

== Background ==
Following the Second English Civil War and subsequent execution of Charles I, in April 1649, Gerrard Winstanley joined the Diggers in squatting George's Hill, where they established an intentional community and attempted to "lay the foundation of making the earth a common treasury for all". When the settlement was broken up by Thomas Fairfax, Winstanley, as the movement's chief theoretician, began to draw from his experiences with Diggers and turned it into a series of writings.

His works intended to advocate a new form of government for the nascent Commonwealth of England, but he put aside most of his scattered writings for two years. In June 1651, Hugh Peter published Good Work for a Good Magistrate, in which he proposed a series of reforms to the newly established Commonwealth of England, such as poverty relief and expanded access to education. After the battle of Worcester, the victory of Oliver Cromwell brought with it a series of state reforms, carried out by Hugh Peter himself, causing many radicals such as Winstanley to take up his challenge of proposing reforms.

The book was released on 20 February 1652, with a dedication to Cromwell, whom Winstanley hope to persuade on his proposals for a new government. The manuscript fell into the hands of several different publishers, who released unattributed and heavily censored excerpts, which removed its more radical communistic tracts, in favour of the sections on law reform and government. On 21 April 1652, Oliver Cromwell read one of these edited texts and reportedly sympathised with some of the proposed reforms.

== Content ==
Basing his arguments in Christian scripture, as well as his own reason and experience, Winstanley argued that many of the reform programs that were circulating didn't go far enough in completely abolishing the remaining institutions of monarchy. Winstanley considered the fall of monarchy to be inevitable, that if governments did not overthrow it, then divine intervention would, citing Daniel 7:25, Revelation 12:14 and Revelation 18:10.

He instead advocated for the Commonwealth to be reorganised into a communist society, without private property or money, like that which he had attempted to establish at George's Hill.

=== Property ===
While land and commodities were to be held in common ownership, Winstanley also considered that men should be allowed to hold their house, family and basic necessities as personal property. All labour was also to be done collectively and overseers were to be appointed to ensure that everybody worked. People who refused to work were to be punished, by denying them of their civil rights and impressing them into forced labour.

=== Law ===
While still displaying the millenarianism of his earlier works, the Law of Freedom was focused largely on institutionalising coercion. Although he still maintained his belief in the rationality of humans that abided by natural law, and that individual freedom naturally arose from economic security, the Law of Freedom presented a more authoritarian vision of communism than his earlier libertarian works. His conflict with the Ranters and freeholders at George's Hill had convinced Winstanley of the need for social control by a "righteous government". He argued that, while he opposed government that acted as an instrument of private ownership, law enforced by a standing army was necessary in order to guard against "rudeness" and to repress expressions of monarchism.

Winstanley proposed laws according to the principle of "an eye for an eye", in which capital punishment was applied to those caught committing murder, rape or trade would be subject, as well as those who were lawyers and parsons.

=== Government ===
For his "righteous government", Winstanley proposed an annually-elected parliamentary system, which would enforce laws, oversee a planned economy and uphold the patriarchy. He also upheld freedom of religion and compulsory education. No longer considering liberty to be universal, Winstanley narrowly defined freedom as the ability to vote, entitlement to the product of one's labour, and the capacity to employ domestic workers.

Drawing upon themes from the reform movement and directly from Peter's work, Winstanley also advocated for every town to annually elect peace makers, who would settle local disputes without resorting to imprisonment.

== Analysis ==
The anarchist Peter Marshall considered the Law of Freedom to be a work of proto-Marxism, which broke from Winstanley's earlier proto-anarchist works. The Marxist historian Christopher Hill considered it to be an example of possibilism, aimed at convincing Oliver Cromwell to implement its proposals.

== Bibliography ==
- Gurney, John (2007). Brave Community: The Digger Movement in the English Revolution. Manchester University Press. pp. 211–217. ISBN 978-0719061035. JSTOR j.ctt155j5m4. OCLC 470777221.
- Marshall, Peter H. (2008) [1992]. Demanding the Impossible: A History of Anarchism. London: Harper Perennial. pp. 96–107. ISBN 978-0-00-686245-1. OCLC 218212571.
