= Communist society =

Type of society and economic system

In Marxist thought, a communist society or the communist system is the socioeconomic system postulated to emerge out of capitalism and through the development of technological advances in the productive forces, representing the ultimate goal of the political ideology of communism. A communist society is characterized by common ownership of the means of production with free access to the articles of consumption and is classless, stateless, and moneyless, implying the end of the exploitation of labour.

Communism is a specific stage of socioeconomic development predicated upon a superabundance of material wealth, which is postulated to arise from advances in production technology and corresponding changes in the social relations of production. This would allow for distribution based on needs and social relations based on freely-associated individuals. The term communist society should be distinguished from the Western concept of the communist state, the latter referring to a state ruled by a party which professes a variation of Marxism–Leninism.

== Economic aspects ==
A communist economic system would be characterized by advanced productive technology that enables material abundance, which in turn would enable the free distribution of most or all economic output and the holding of the means of producing this output in common. In this respect, communism is differentiated from socialism, which, out of economic necessity, restricts access to articles of consumption and services based on one's contribution.

In further contrast to previous economic systems, communism would be characterized by the holding of natural resources and the means of production in common as opposed to them being privately owned (as in the case of capitalism) or owned by public or cooperative organizations that similarly restrict their access (as in the case of socialism). In this sense, communism involves the "negation of property" insofar as there would be little economic rationale for exclusive control over production assets in an environment of material abundance.

The fully developed communist economic system is postulated to develop from a preceding socialist system. Marx held the view that socialism—a system based on social ownership of the means of production—would enable progress toward the development of fully developed communism by further advancing productive technology. Under socialism, with its increasing levels of automation, an increasing proportion of goods would be distributed freely.

== Social aspects ==
=== Individuality, freedom and creativity ===
A communist society would free individuals from long working hours by first automating production to an extent that the average length of the working day is reduced and second by eliminating the exploitation inherent in the division between workers and owners. A communist system would thus free individuals from alienation in the sense of having one's life structured around survival (making a wage or salary in a capitalist system), which Karl Marx referred to as a transition from the "realm of necessity" to the "realm of freedom". As a result, a communist society is envisioned as being composed of an intellectually-inclined population with both the time and resources to pursue its creative hobbies and genuine interests, and to contribute to creative social wealth in this manner. Marx considered "true richness" to be the amount of time one has at one's disposal to pursue one's creative passions. Marx's notion of communism is in this way radically individualistic.

In fact, the realm of freedom actually begins only where labor which is determined by necessity and mundane considerations ceases; thus in the very nature of things it lies beyond the sphere of actual material production.

— Capital, Volume III, 1894

Marx's concept of the "realm of freedom" goes hand-in-hand with his idea of the ending of the division of labor, which would not be required in a society with highly automated production and limited work roles. In a communist society, economic necessity and relations would cease to determine cultural and social relations. As scarcity is eliminated, alienated labor would cease, and people would be free to pursue their individual goals. Additionally, it is believed that the principle of "from each according to his ability, to each according to his needs" could be fulfilled due to scarcity being non-existent.

=== Politics, law and governance ===
Marx and Engels maintained that a communist society would have no need for the state as it exists in contemporary capitalist society. The capitalist state mainly exists to enforce hierarchical economic relations, to enforce the exclusive control of property, and to regulate capitalistic economic activities—all of which would be non-applicable to a communist system.

Engels noted that in a socialist system the primary function of public institutions will shift from being about the creation of laws and the control of people into a technical role as an administrator of technical production processes, with a decrease in the scope of traditional politics as scientific administration overtakes the role of political decision-making. Communist society is characterized by democratic processes, not merely in the sense of electoral democracy, but in the broader sense of open and collaborative social and workplace environments.

Marx never clearly specified whether or not he thought a communist society would be just; other thinkers have speculated that he thought communism would transcend justice and create a society without conflicts, thus, without the need for rules of justice.

=== Transitional stages ===
Marx also wrote that between capitalist and communist society, there would be a transitory period known as the dictatorship of the proletariat. During this preceding phase of societal development, capitalist economic relationships would gradually be abolished and replaced with socialism. Natural resources would become public property, while all manufacturing centers and workplaces would become socially owned and democratically managed. Production would be organized by scientific assessment and planning, thus eliminating what Marx called the "anarchy in production". The development of the productive forces would lead to the marginalization of human labor to the highest possible extent, to be gradually replaced by automated labor.

== In Soviet ideology ==
The communist economic system was officially enumerated as the ultimate goal of the Communist Party of the Soviet Union in its party platform. The 1986 Programme of the CPSU outlined principles such as classlessness, public ownership of the means of production, social equality for all members of society, growth of productive forces based on progress in science and technology, the principle "From each according to his ability, to each according to his needs", self-government, and social homegeneity. According to it, "The inalienable feature of the communist mode of life is a high level of consciousness, social activity, discipline, and self-discipline of members of society, in which observance of the uniform, generally accepted rules of communist conduct will become an inner need and habit of every person.

In Vladimir Lenin's political theory, a classless society would be a society controlled by the direct producers, organized to produce according to socially managed goals. Such a society, Lenin suggested, would develop habits that would gradually make political representation unnecessary, as the radically democratic nature of the Soviets would lead citizens to come to agree with the representatives' style of management. Only in this environment, Lenin suggested, could the state wither away, ushering in a period of stateless communism.

In Soviet ideology, Marx's concepts of the "lower and higher phases of communism" articulated in the Critique of the Gotha Program were reformulated as the stages of "socialism" and "communism". The Soviet state claimed to have begun the phase of "socialist construction" during the implementation of the first Five-Year Plans during the 1930s, which introduced a centrally planned, nationalized/collectivized economy. The 1962 Program of the Communist Party of the Soviet Union, published under the leadership of Nikita Khrushchev, claimed that socialism had been firmly established in the USSR, and that the state would now progress to the "full-scale construction of communism", although this may be understood to refer to the "technical foundations" of communism more so than the withering away of the state and the division of labor per se. However, even in the final edition of its program before the party's dissolution, the CPSU did not claim to have fully established communism, instead claiming that the society was undergoing a very slow and gradual process of transition.

== Fictional portrayals ==
Several works of utopian fiction have portrayed versions of a communist society. Some examples include: Assemblywomen (391 BC) by Aristophanes, an early piece of utopian satire which mocks Athenian democracy's excesses through the story of the Athenian women taking control of the government and instituting a proto-communist utopia;

The Law of Freedom in a Platform (1652) by Gerrard Winstanley, a radical communist vision of an ideal state; News from Nowhere (1892) by William Morris, describing a future society based on common ownership and democratic control of the means of production; Red Star (1908, Russian: Красная звезда), Alexander Bogdanov's 1908 science fiction novel about a communist society on Mars; and The Dispossessed: An Ambiguous Utopia (1974) by Ursula K. Le Guin, set between a pair of planets: one that like Earth today is dominated by private property, nation states, gender hierarchy, and war, and the other an anarchist society without private property.

The economy and society of the United Federation of Planets in the Star Trek franchise has been described as a communist society where material scarcity has been eliminated due to the wide availability of replicator technology that enables free distribution of output, where there is no need for money.

The Culture novels by Iain M Banks are centered on a communist post-scarcity economy where technology is advanced to such a degree that all production is automated, and there is no use for money or property (aside from personal possessions with sentimental value). Humans in the Culture are free to pursue their own interests in an open and socially-permissive society. The society has been described by some commentators as "communist-bloc" or "anarcho-communist". Banks' close friend and fellow science fiction writer Ken MacLeod has said that The Culture can be seen as a realization of Marx's communism, but adds that "however friendly he was to the radical left, Iain had little interest in relating the long-range possibility of utopia to radical politics in the here and now. As he saw it, what mattered was to keep the utopian possibility open by continuing technological progress, especially space development, and in the meantime to support whatever policies and politics in the real world were rational and humane."

== See also ==
- Anarchist communism
- Commons-based peer production
- Communism in 20 years
- Communization
- Digital commons (economics)
- Marxism
- Open source
- Post-scarcity
- Social ownership
- Socialist mode of production
- Technological determinism
