= Pauline Murray (actress) =

Pauline Murray in It Happened Here

Pauline Murray (born Dublin, Ireland, 30 August 1922; died Kington, Herefordshire, England, 31 December 1994) was a nurse and occasional actress, and is best known for her portrayal of nurse Pauline in the leading role of the 1966 alternate history British film, It Happened Here, a hypothetical account of England in 1944/45 under German occupation.

== Life and career ==
During the Second World War Murray qualified as a nurse and served in Manchester. In 1950 she married Dr. Richard Jobson (died 1978), a General Practitioner in New Radnor, near the English border in Wales. During an award ceremony in London in 1957, her husband was approached by Kevin Brownlow, the writer and director of It Happened Here. The film journalist Derek Hill recommended Murray, whom Brownlow had not yet met, as being perfect for a role in the film - despite the fact that Murray, as far as he knew, had never acted in film before. It now seems however she first appeared on screen as Marion, an English maid, in the Danish film Støt står den danske sømand released in 1948, telling the true story of Danish sailors who sailed with the Allied forces during the German occupation of Denmark in World War II]].

Pauline was a sort of Mrs. Miniver on camera and off. She never turned a hair when we arrived at her house with 25 muddy extras in German uniform. She cooked vast amounts of stew, found everyone places to sleep and still found time to play her own part... Her nursing experience proved invaluable during the film - we even made her character a nurse....We realised we had that rarest of creatures, a natural actress.... Towards the end of the film, when she found herself playing opposite seasoned professionals like Sebastian Shaw and Fiona Leland, she wrote to me after seeing the rushes; "Sebastian and Fiona seemed alive, real people and I look like a vicious moron. If we hadn't got so far, I'd say get someone else. I honestly feel the lack of expression on my face is disastrous and could ruin the whole thing for you." Fortunately, we could see what she couldn't - that in her restraint lay her strength. For Pauline Murray was the film. And as it depended on her performance, so we all grew to depend on her.

— Brownlow, The Independent

After her part in It Happened Here, Murray never acted in film again, but she continued to appear in village plays.
