= Little Heath, Surrey =

Village in the Borough of Elmbridge in Surrey, England

Coordinates: 51°19′41″N 0°22′26″W

Little Heath
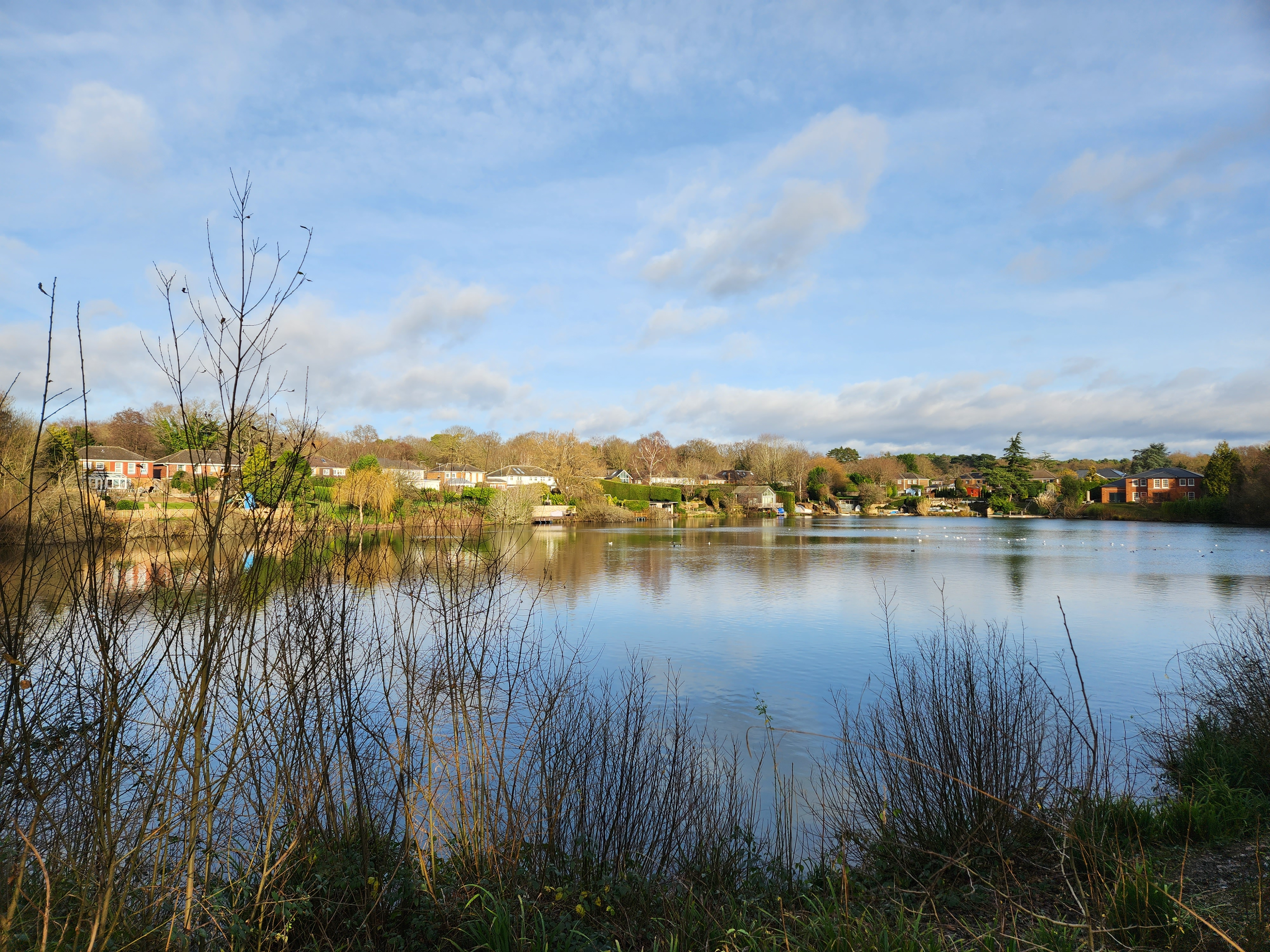
- A view over the lake at Little Heath. Formerly the site of a clay pit and brickworks.

- Location within Surrey
- OS grid reference: TQ1327
  - London: 17 mi (27 km)
- Civil parish: n/a
- District: Elmbridge
- Shire county: Surrey
- Region: South East
- Country: England
- Sovereign state: United Kingdom
- Post town: Cobham
- Postcode district: KT11
- Dialling code: 01932
- Police: Surrey
- Fire: Surrey
- Ambulance: South East Coast
- UK Parliament: Esher and Walton

Little Heath, sometimes spelt as "Littleheath", is an area of Cobham in the borough of Elmbridge in Surrey, England. It borders the nearby villages of Oxshott and Stoke d'Abernon.

== History ==
The area is best known as the site of a Diggers settlement in 1649 when a group expelled from St George's Hill, Weybridge, successfully established a short lived community. The Diggers cultivated 11 acres, constructed six houses, and began publishing pamphlets. Despite initial sympathy from the local lord, Parson John Platt, the community faced opposition as Platt, along with local landowners, mobilized gangs to thwart support and, ultimately, drove them out in April 1650.

During the 19th century a brickworks and clay pit occupied much of the Little Heath area. During the First World War the area was used as an ammunition dump with the brickworks resuming after the war. The site was occupied by the Canadian army during the Second World War. Following the war the brickworks reopened and continued until its final closure and the demolition of its buildings in 1958 after which the land was rehabilitated and the old claypit turned into a lake. Housing was developed around on the northern end of the lake whilst the southern end was made into a public park accessible from paths at Heathield Road and Blundel Lane.
