= Alexander Garden Obelisk =

- Памятник-обелиск в Александровском саду
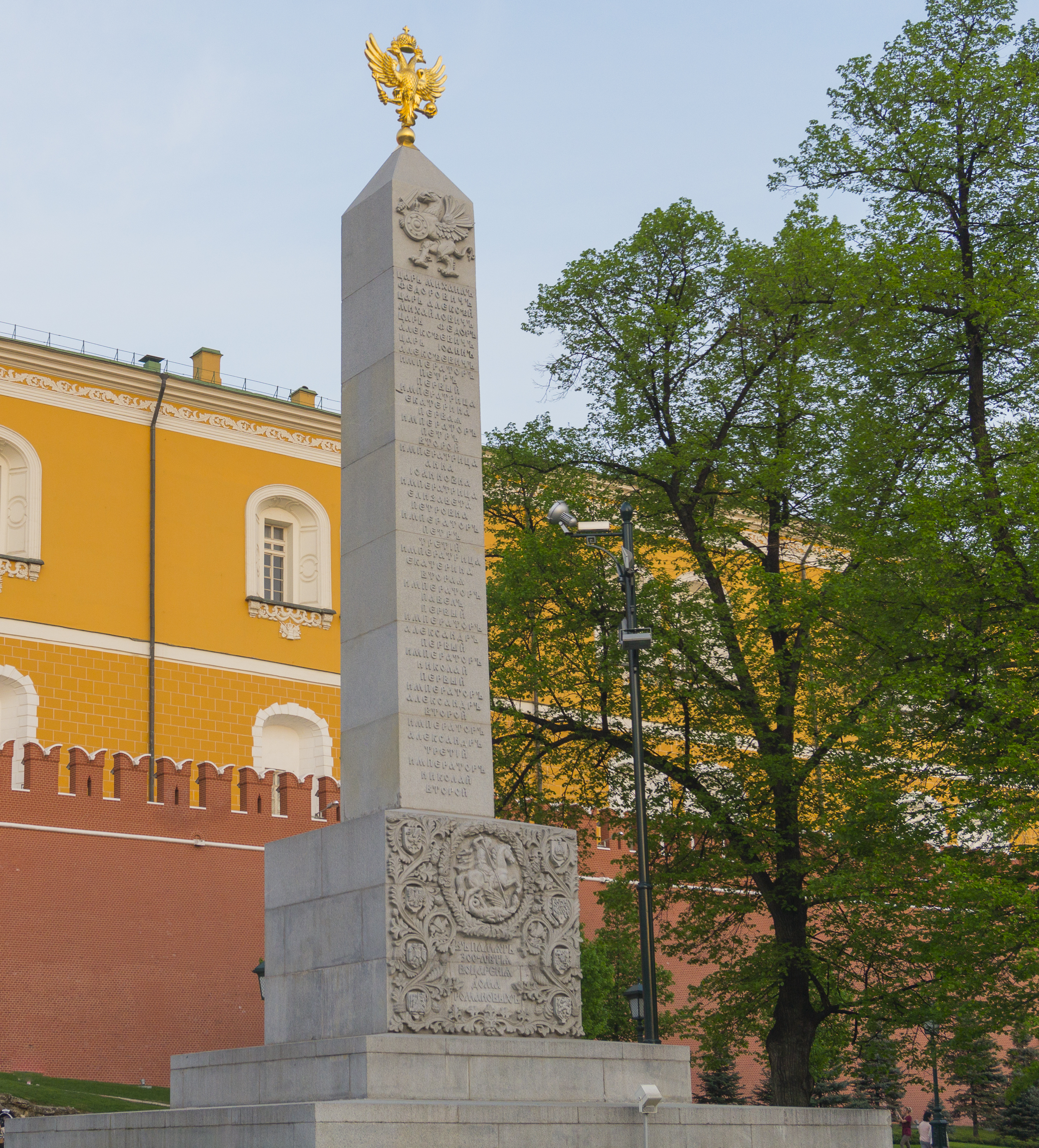
- Obelisk in 2014, after the 2013 restoration
- Interactive map of Alexander Garden Obelisk
- Location: Alexander Garden, Moscow, Russia
- Coordinates: 55.7537°N 37.6149°E
- Designer: Sergey Aleksandrovich Vlasev
- Type: obelisk
- Material: granite
- Beginning date: Spring 1914
- Completion date: 10 July 1914
- Dedicated to: 300th anniversary of the House of Romanov

The Alexander Garden Obelisk is an obelisk located within the Alexander Garden, near the walls of Kremlin, in Moscow, Russia. The obelisk was initially designed by Sergey Aleksandrovich Vlasev and erected on July 10, 1914, at the entrance of the garden. It was created as a celebration of the tercentenary of the House of Romanov. The obelisk was moved closer to the center of the garden in 1966.

In 1918, soon after the October revolution, the inscriptions and reliefs on the obelisk were altered, so that it became a memorial to the "outstanding thinkers and personalities of the struggle for the liberation of workers". Names of the Romanov rulers were replaced with the names of the revolutionary thinkers and political figures. It thus became the first monument of the new socialist state.

In 2013, on the 400th anniversary of the Romanov dynasty, the monument was dismantled for the sake of creating a modern replica of the original monument to the Russian rulers of the Romanov Dynasty. According to specialists, the original monument was almost lost in the process.

== Russian Empire ==
Тhe Vlasev project of the obelisk (under the motto "The Truth") won the 2nd place in a special contest titled "Project of the Monument-Obelisk to Commemorate the 300th Anniversary of the Romanov Dynasty" in 1912. The anniversary was to be celebrated in 1913. Money for its construction came from the city of Moscow – up to fifty thousand rubles was allocated by the Moscow city Duma.

Since the initial plan did not gain the approval of the Academy of Arts, it took some time to correct the shortcomings as direct work on the construction of the monument only began in the spring of 1914. The ceremony of the unveiling was held on April 18, 1914. Then there was a parade in the garden of the Troops. The parade was commanded by the commander of the 1st Grenadier Brigade, Major General Holmsen. The Parade Commander of the Moscow Military District the General-of-Cavalry Pavel Adamovich Pleve, appearing in the middle of the Front Troops, proclaimed a toast for the "Adored Sovereign Master of the Russian Land of the Emperor and the whole Reigning House." The Troops, taking "On-Guard" position, replied with thunderous, long cheers; the orchestra played God Save The Tsar! Then, Pleve made a toast to the "prosperity and welfare of the city of Moscow". In response to this, there was a mighty Bang; the orchestra played the March of the Transfiguration. Acting mayor, Victor Bryansky thanked general Pleve on behalf of the City of Moscow and made a toast. Then the Troops were overlooked by the Ceremonial March.

=== Original appearance ===
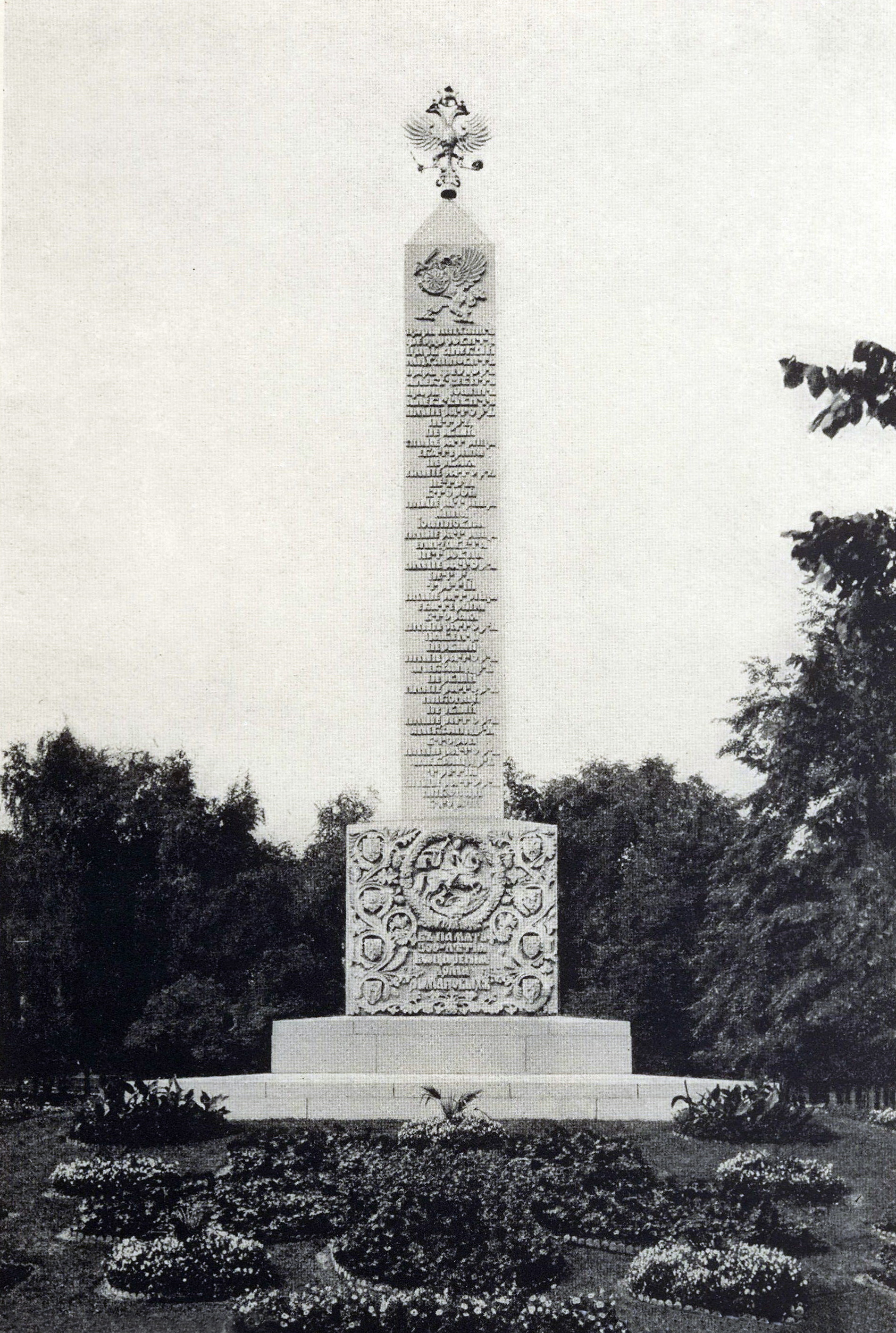
Romanovsky obelisk in 1914–1918.

The memorial was erected in the Upper Alexander garden near the main gate, leading from Voskresenskaya square in the Alexander garden. The monument consists of two parts. Foursided obelisk of Finnish granite was crowned with a double-headed eagle. At the top of the obelisk sits the coat of arms of the Romanov boyars — a Griffin with sword and shield. Below were inscribed the names of the kings and emperors of the Romanov dynasty from Mikhail Fyodorovich to Nicholas II (except for Ivan VI Antonovich; after "Empress Anna Ioannovna" comes "Empress Elizabeth Petrovna"). The cubic base had a relief of Saint George and the small coats of arms of provinces and regions of Russia in the shields.

The whole monument rested on two plateaus that are elevated above the surface. The upper part of the monument (obelisk itself) was made of seven monolithic granite pieces and the lower one of granite-faced slabs. The obelisk crowning the double-headed eagle is from cast bronze, chased and gilded. On the upper part of the anniversary inscription was the coat of arms of the House of Romanov, and on the pedestal was an inscription reading: "In memory of the 300th of the accession of the House of Romanov" and the coats of arms of Moscow, Kazan, Astrakhan, Poland, Siberia, Georgia; the United Coats of Arms of the Grand Duchies of Kiev, Vladimir, Novgorod, arms of the Grand Duchy of Finland".

== The Soviet period ==
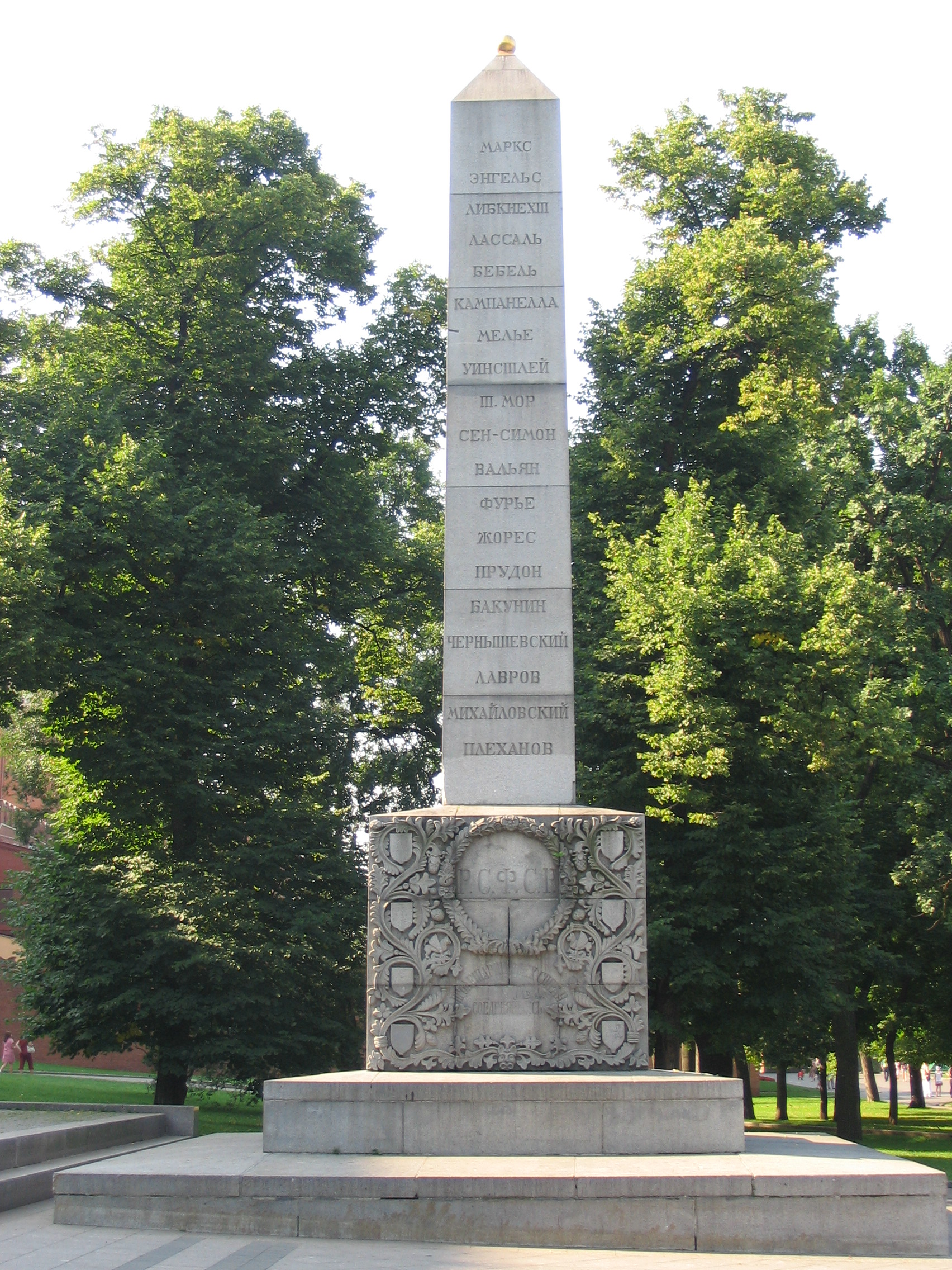
The obelisk in 2008, before the restoration.

Adopted after the October revolution, Lenin's plan of monumental propaganda involved the demolition of "monuments in honor of tsars and their servants" (the decree of the CPC 12.04.18 G. "On removing monuments erected in honor of tsars and their servants and the elaboration of projects of monuments of Russian Socialist Revolution") and the construction of a large number of monuments and memorial plaques in honor of the fighters of the revolution of all times and peoples. The obelisk in the Alexander garden, without being physically liquidated, embodied both sides of Lenin's plan — it was turned into a monument to the leaders of the socialist and Communist thoughts and their precursors. During August–September 1918, according to the decision of the city Council Executive Committee, dated August 17, 1918 under the direction of architect N. A. Vsevolozhsky, the obelisk was altered:

- the eagle from the peak was removed (with the help of the Latvian Riflemen)
- emblems with the Foundation were removed (cartouche and shields from the coats of arms preserved)
- in the central cartouche, the image of Saint George was replaced with the inscription "R.S.F.S.R." and "Proletarians of all countries, unite!")
- the names of the kings of the needle of the obelisk were shot down. In their place a list was put of 19 social thinkers and political figures, approved by Lenin. The list of names was entrusted to a prominent Bolshevik, Vladimir Friche.

The order of the names is not chronological: the list begins with Marx and Engels, followed by three of the founders of the German Social Democratic Party (1860) and then the figures of the utopian socialism of the XVI and following centuries, also non-chronologically. The complete list contains five Russians — representatives of different political currents, including subsequently the opposition to Bolshevism (for example, the populist N. K. Mikhailovsky, anarchist M. A. Bakunin and Menshevik G. V. Plekhanov). There are no Bolsheviks named on the stele (the list included only deceased figures, the last of them, Plekhanov, died the same year as the alteration of the monument). " The alteration of the monument was the actual and symbolic value: a revolution that destroyed the tsarist dynasty destroyed the obelisk that is associated with the glorification of the dynasty, and erased all the names of its rulers" (the magazine of Art, 1939) "

The opening of the monument, called "Monument obelisk outstanding thinkers and personalities of the struggle for the liberation of workers", was timed to coincide with the first anniversary of the Revolution and took place in October 1918.

=== Inscribed names ===
In order, they are:

1. Karl Marx
2. Friedrich Engels
3. Wilhelm Liebknecht
4. Ferdinand Lassalle
5. August Bebel
6. Tommaso Campanella
7. Jean Meslier
8. Gerrard Winstanley
9. Thomas More
10. Claude-Henri Saint-Simon
11. Edouard Vaillant
12. Charles Fourier
13. Jean Jaurès
14. Pierre-Joseph Proudhon
15. Mikhail Bakunin
16. Nikolay Chernyshevsky
17. Pyotr Lavrov
18. Nikolay Mikhaylovsky
19. Georgi Plekhanov

=== Move ===
In 1966, the monument, originally located at the entrance to the upper garden, was moved to the center of the upper gardens, in front of the ruined grotto, in connection with the construction of the Tomb of the Unknown Soldier. On this exact place, on the 3 November 1918, the first anniversary of the Revolution, was established and stood for several days the concrete figure of Robespierre (work of sculptor B. J. Sandomirsky). But soon the monument was blown up by unknown persons — on the 7th of November, the sculpture was found destroyed. "Northern commune" reported: "the Monument to Robespierre on the night of 6/7 November had been destroyed by someone's criminal hand. The figure of Robespierre, made of concrete, turned into a pile of small fragments scattered around. The pedestal has survived. On a guarded scene and put under investigation". However, another newspaper, "Izvestia", offered another version of the monument allegedly collapsed", due to improper location of the center of gravity of the whole figure of the monument is that it was noticed even when it was being built".

== Recent years ==
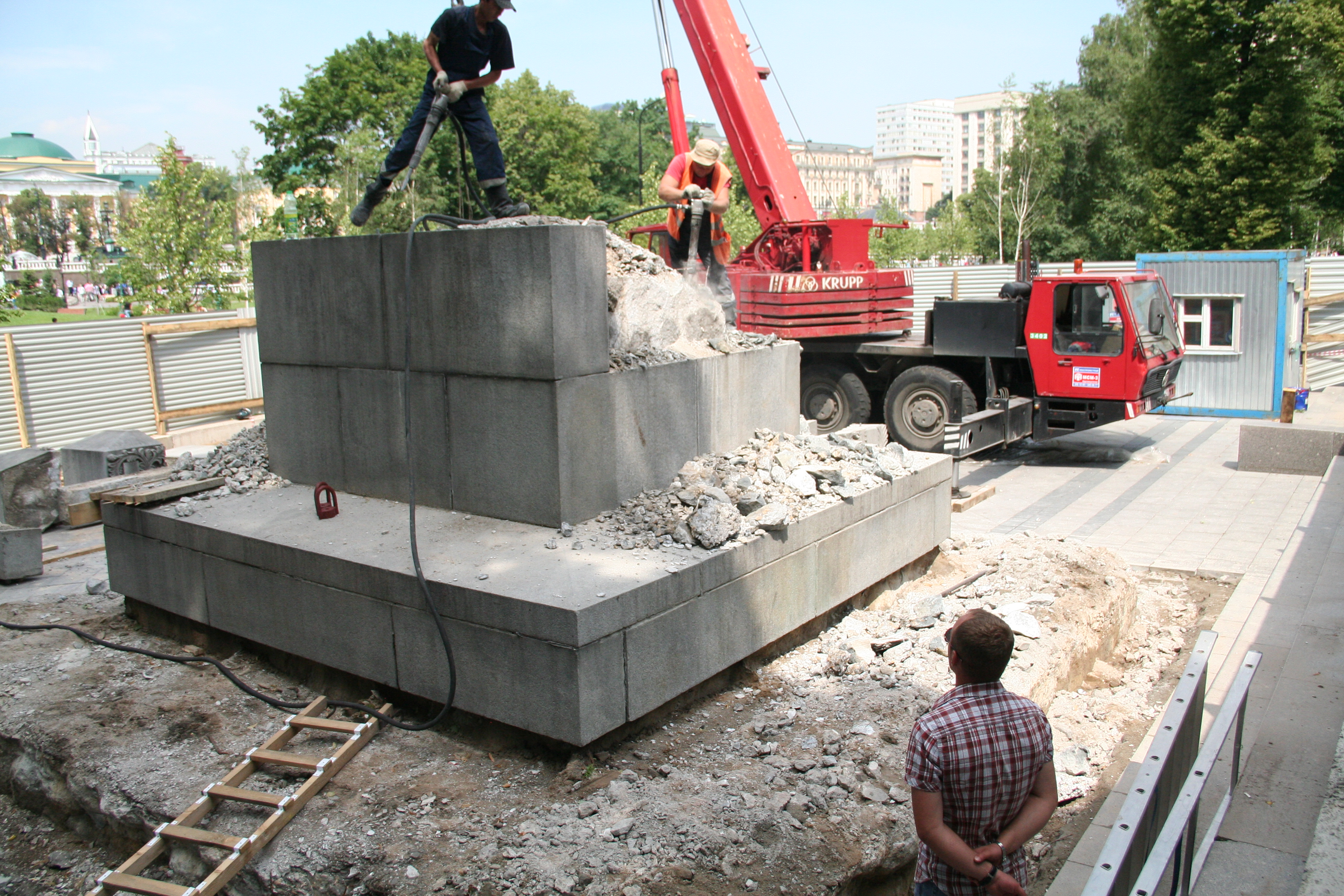
Dismantling of the monument-the obelisk on 2 July 2013.

The proposal to restore Romanovsky obelisk in its original form to the 400th anniversary of the Romanov house has been repeatedly heard from members of the public, in particular, the Fund's "Return". At the beginning of 2013, Vice-president of Fund "Return" for legal issues, Daniel Petrov said that "another appeal of Fund "Return" on Romanovsky obelisk, mutilated by Bolsheviks and standing in the Alexander garden near the Kremlin wall, finally, gave a preliminary result. The Ministry of Culture is ready to consider returning the monument to its historic appearance". According to him, now "the Ministry needs all the documentary and historical materials on this monument, including local literature in Moscow". In this regard, he urged Russian historians and ethnographers to participate in this work, and "if anyone has materials on this subject (articles in books, guidebooks, photos before 1918 and after), etc., I am grateful for them sending me to message the Ministry of Culture". On 27 May 2013, in the Alexander garden, on visual axis Manezhnaya Square—the obelisk—the grotto, an entirely new monument to Patriarch Hermogenes was erected. After nearly a month, on 2 July 2013, the obelisk was dismantled for reconstruction, without prior announcement, which caused questions from some residents about its fate. The press-Secretary of Department of presidential Affairs Viktor Khrekov explained that the monument will return to its place by November 4. According to him, the obelisk was dismantled, because "when you transfer to a new place in Soviet times, mistakes were made, which further has led to the fact that the obelisk tilted and began to pose a serious threat to people". A special working group under the Ministry of Culture came to the conclusion that the monument was "necessary to restore and strengthen the foundations". The restoration of the obelisk has been in charge of the company "Alfastroy", questioned for not having the proper license.

At the end of October 2013, the restored monument began to be mounted. Sculptor Nikolai Avvakumov found mistakes and inaccuracies made during the restoration. In particular, the inscriptions were made using standard font Izhitsa Cyrillic, while in some words there were spelling errors; the reconstructed image also does not correspond to the original. The photographs of the monument on the opening day, 4 November 2013,show that two of the Avvakumov's spelling errors have been fixed (hard sign in the word "memory" has been replaced with soft, added existed in the original text the hyphen in the word "300th anniversary"). Public movement "Arhnadzor" declared that "the restoration of the obelisk took place without any open expert and public discussion of its plan and project". In the end, "the original of 1914 has not been properly restored, and the obelisk is now not a monument of any era." Later "Arhnadzor" declared that "the works carried out in 2013 on the obelisk cannot be called a restoration."

== Popular culture ==
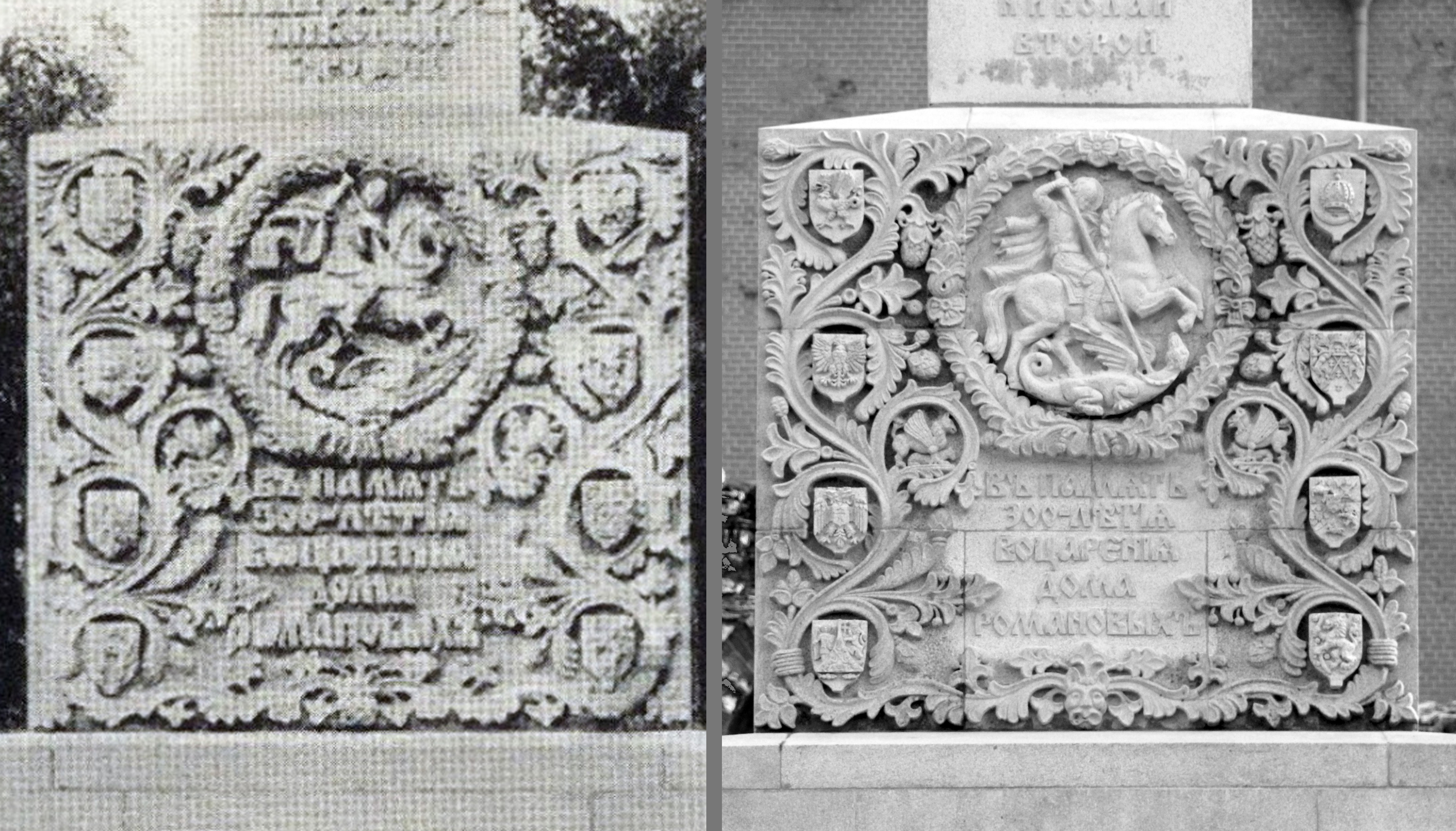
The obelisk in 1914 and after the refurbishment in 2013.

- Soviet school book to read — A. P. Shikman, "Obelisk in Alexandrovsky garden: lives of the great socialists" (1990) consisted of biographical essays about people whose names were carved on the obelisk.
- Dimitry Valovoi & Henrietta Lapshina. Names on an Obelisk. Moscow: Progress Publishers. 1983. English-language Soviet book providing short biographies of the persons named on the obelisk.
