= Gerrard Winstanley =

English philosopher and activist (1609–1676)

- Born: Parish of Wigan, Lancashire, England
- Baptised: 19 October 1609
- Died: 10 September 1676 (aged 66)
- Movement: True Levellers
- Spouse: Susan King (m. 1640, died) Elizabeth Stanley (m. 1664)
- Children: 3

Gerrard Winstanley (baptised 19 October 1609 – 10 September 1676) was an English Protestant religious reformer, political philosopher, and activist during the period of the Commonwealth of England. Winstanley was the leader and one of the founders of the English group known as the True Levellers or Diggers. The group occupied formerly common land that had been privatised by enclosures and dug them over, pulling down hedges and filling in ditches, to plant crops. "True Levellers" was the name they used to describe themselves, whereas the term "Diggers" was coined by contemporaries.

== Early life ==
Gerrard Winstanley was baptised on 19 October 1609, the son of Edward Winstanley, mercer, and was baptised in the parish of Wigan, then part of the West Derby hundred of Lancashire. His mother's identity remains unknown and he could have been born anywhere in the parish of Wigan. which contained the townships of Abram, Aspull, Billinge-and-Winstanley, Dalton, Haigh, Hindley, Ince-in-Makerfield, Orrell, Pemberton, and Upholland, and Wigan itself.

In 1630, Winstanley migrated to the City of London, where he became an apprentice to Sarah Gater, the widow of a Merchant Tailor. In 1638, he was admitted as a freeman of the Merchant Tailors' Company, a trade guild. In 1639, he married Susan King, the daughter of William King, a London surgeon.

The First English Civil War disrupted Winstanley’s business, and in 1643 he was made bankrupt. His father-in-law helped him to move to Cobham, Surrey, where he initially worked as a cowherd.

== The New Law of Righteousness ==
In 1648, Winstanley published a pamphlet called The New Law of Righteousness. The basis of this work came from the downtrodden state of the labouring population of England under the encroachment of private property by means of the Enclosures of common land; the remedy it espouses is the communal life, as exposed in Acts 2, verses 44 and 45: "And all that believed were together, and had all things common; And sold their possessions and goods, and parted them to all men, as every man had need." Winstanley argued that:

In the beginning of Time, the great Creator Reason, made the Earth to be a Common Treasury, to preserve Beasts, Birds, Fishes, and Man, the lord that was to govern this Creation; for Man had Domination given to him, over the Beasts, Birds, and Fishes; but not one word was spoken in the beginning, That one branch of mankind should rule over another. And the Reason is this, Every single man, Male and Female, is a perfect Creature of himself; and the same Spirit that made the Globe, dwels in man to govern the Globe; so that the flesh of man being subject to Reason, his Maker, hath him to be his Teacher and Ruler within himself, therefore needs not run abroad after any Teacher and Ruler without him, for he needs not that any man should teach him, for the same Anoynting that ruled in the Son of man, teacheth him all things... And so selfish imaginations taking possession of the Five Sences, and ruling as King in the room of Reason therein, and working with Covetousnesse, did set up one man to teach and rule over another; and thereby the Spirit was killed, and man was brought into bondage, and became a greater Slave to such of his own kind, then the Beasts of the field were to him.

Winstanley took as his basic texts the Biblical sacred history, with its affirmation that all men were descended from a common stock, and with its scepticism about the rulership of kings, voiced in the Books of Samuel; and the New Testament's affirmations that God was no respecter of persons, that there were no masters or slaves under the New Covenant. From these and similar texts, he interpreted Christian teaching as calling for the abolition of property [in land] and aristocracy. For him, nature "is in effect God, and this pantheistic materialism proclaimed the equality of all people through nature as well as the usefulness of popular sciences -alchemy, astrology, herbal medicine and the magical arts."

Winstanley wrote: "Seeing the common people of England by joynt consent of person and purse have caste out Charles our Norman oppressour, wee have by this victory recovered ourselves from under his Norman yoake."

His theme was rooted in ancient English radical thought. It went back at least to the days of the Peasants' Revolt (1381) led by Wat Tyler, because that is when a verse of the Lollard priest John Ball was circulated:

When Adam delved and Eve span,
Who was then the gentleman?

== The Diggers ==
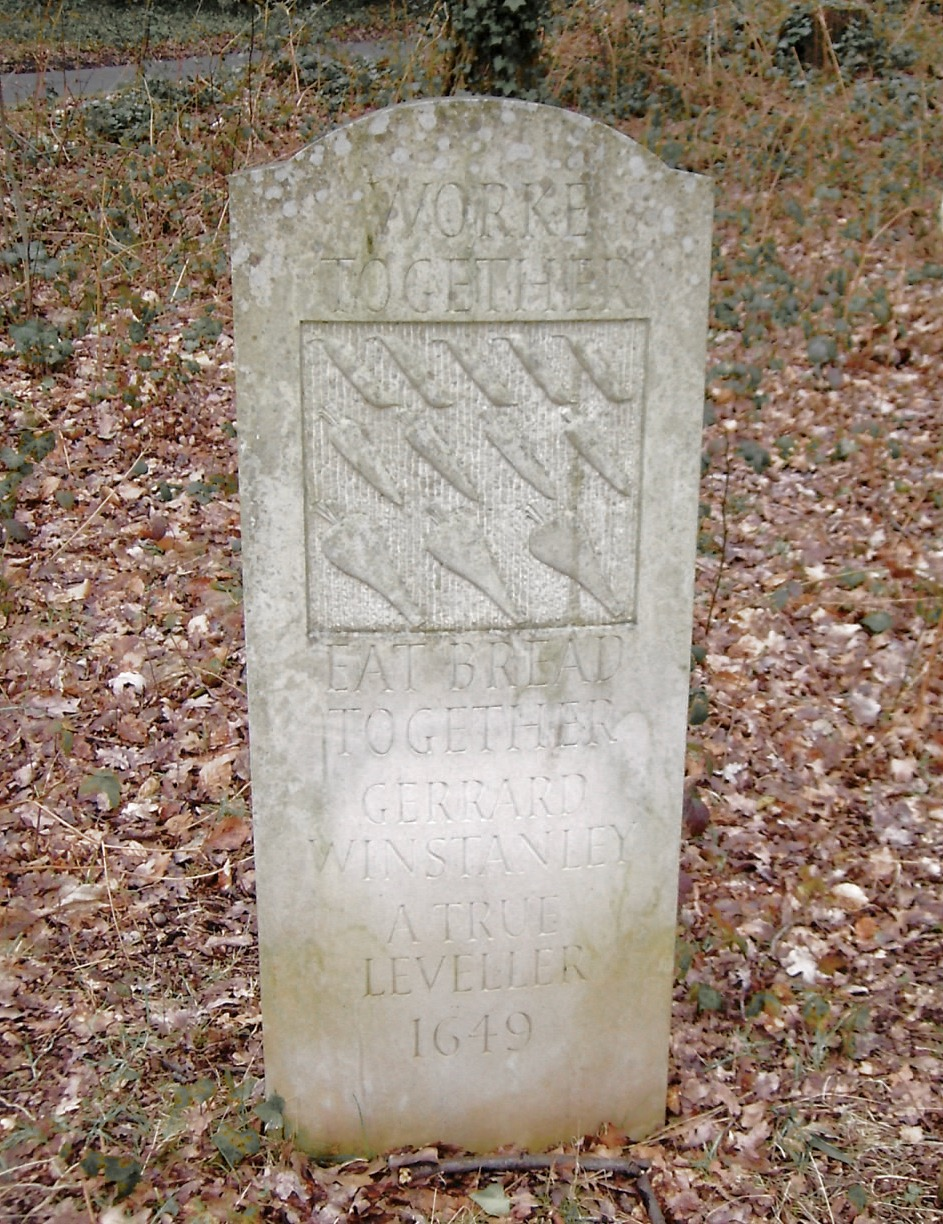
A memorial to Gerrard Winstanley, located close to Weybridge railway station, was unveiled in December 2000.

On 1 April 1649, Winstanley and his followers took over vacant or common lands on St George's Hill in Surrey. Other Digger colonies followed in Buckinghamshire, Kent, and Northamptonshire. Their action was to cultivate the land and distribute food without charge to any who would join them in the work. Local landowners took fright from the Diggers' activities and in 1650 sent hired armed men to beat the Diggers and destroy their colony. Winstanley protested to the government, but to no avail, and eventually the colony was abandoned.

After the failure of the Digger experiment in Surrey in 1650, Winstanley temporarily fled to Pirton, Hertfordshire, where he took up employment as an estate steward for the aristocratic mystic Lady Eleanor Davies. This employment lasted less than a year. It ended when Davies accused Winstanley of mismanaging her property, and he then returned to Cobham.

Winstanley continued to advocate the redistribution of land. In 1652, he published another pamphlet called The Law of Freedom in a Platform, in which he argued that the Christian basis for society is where property and wages are abolished. In keeping with Winstanley's adherence to biblical models, the tract envisages a communistic society structured on non-hierarchical lines, though one likely to have voluntary patriarchs.

== Quakers ==
By 1654 Winstanley was possibly assisting Edward Burrough, an early leader of the Quakers, later called the Society of Friends. It seems that Winstanley remained a Quaker for the rest of his life, since his death was noted in Quaker records. However, his Quakerism may not have been very strong as he was involved in the government of his local parish church from 1659 onwards though it is not unknown for committed Quakers to retain strong ties to other religious traditions, even including priesthood. He may have been buried in a Quaker cemetery.

Winstanley believed in Christian Universalism, the doctrine that everyone, however sinful, will eventually be reconciled to God; he wrote that "in the end every man shall be saved, though some at the last hour." His book The Mysterie of God is apparently the first theological work in the English language to state this universalism.

== Later life ==
In 1657 Winstanley and his wife Susan received a gift of property in Ham Manor in Cobham, from his father-in-law William King. This marked Winstanley's renovation in social status locally and he became waywarden of the parish in 1659, overseer of the poor in 1660 and churchwarden of the Church of England parish church in 1667–68. He was elected Chief Constable of Elmbridge, Surrey, in October 1671. These offices on the face of it conflicted with Winstanley's apparent Quakerism, a religion which later became more quietist.

When Susan died in about 1664, Winstanley sold the land in Cobham to King for £50. Winstanley returned to London to trade, whilst retaining some connections in Surrey. In about 1665 he married his second wife, Elizabeth Stanley, and re-entered commerce as a corn chandler. Winstanley died in 1676, aged 66, vexed by legal disputes concerning a small legacy owed to him in a will.

== Legacy ==
In the centuries following his death, Winstanley became an influential figure in leftist history. His writings have been interpreted as precursors to socialist and communist ideas. According to Marxist historian Christopher Hill:

"Gerrard Winstanley was working out a collectivist theory which looks forward to nineteenth- and twentieth-century socialism and communism as well as glancing backwards to a vanishing village community."

The Soviet-era Alexander Garden Obelisk in Moscow, Russia, created in 1918, included Winstanley among a list of outstanding thinkers and personalities of the struggle for the liberation of workers.

In 1999, the British activist group The Land is Ours celebrated the Digger movement's 350th anniversary with a march and reoccupation of St George's Hill, the site of the first Digger colony. Like the original colony, this settlement was quickly disbanded. Since 2010 a Wigan Diggers’ Festival has been held annually in Winstanley's birth town of Wigan attracting support across the North of England.

=== Collected works ===
The Complete Works of Gerrard Winstanley, edited jointly by Thomas N. Corns, Ann Hughes and David Loewenstein, were published by the Oxford University Press in December 2009 at £229 (ISBN 978-0-19-957606-7).

A shorter and less comprehensive volume containing all the major works, Gerrard Winstanley: A Common Treasury edited by Andrew Hopton, was published in 1989 by Aporia (ISBN 978-0-948518-45-4) and reprinted several times since, most recently in 2011 (paperback) by Verso Books (UK) with an introduction by Tony Benn (ISBN 978-1-84467-595-1).

Christopher Hill also published an edited collection of Winstanley's writings, The Law of Freedom and Other Writings, initially published in a Pelican Classics edition, then reprinted by Cambridge University Press.

=== Related works ===
1975 saw the release of Kevin Brownlow and Andrew Mollo's film Winstanley. As with the duo's previous film, It Happened Here, it had taken several years to produce with a very low budget. Winstanley was loosely based on a 1961 novel by David Caute entitled Comrade Jacob and was produced in a quasi-documentary style, with great attention to period detail – even to the point of only using breeds of animals which were known to exist at the time, and actual Civil War armour and weapons borrowed from the Tower of London museum. In 2009 UKA Press released Winstanley: Warts and all (ISBN 978-1-905796-22-9), the story of the making of this film, by Brownlow who has published books as to other films also.

The song, "The World Turned Upside Down", by English folksinger Leon Rosselson, weaves many of Winstanley's own words into the lyrics. An older song, the "Diggers' Song", said to have been written by Winstanley, was recorded by the English group Chumbawamba on their English Rebel Songs 1381–1914 in 1988.

== Quotations ==
From A Declaration from the Poor Oppressed People of England:

The power of enclosing land and owning property was brought into the creation by your ancestors by the sword; which first did murder their fellow creatures, men, and after plunder or steal away their land, and left this land successively to you, their children. And therefore, though you did not kill or thieve, yet you hold that cursed thing in your hand by the power of the sword; and so you justify the wicked deeds of your fathers, and that sin of your fathers shall be visited upon the head of you and your children to the third and fourth generation, and longer too, till your bloody and thieving power be rooted out of the land.

From A Watch-word to the City of London, and Army:

Alas! you poor blind earth-moles, you strive to take away my livelihood and the liberty of this poor weak frame my body of flesh, which is my house I dwell in for a time; but I strive to cast down your kingdom of darkness, and to open hell gates, and to break the devil's bonds asunder wherewith you are tied, and that you my enemies may live in peace; and that is all the harm I would have you to have.

From A New-year's Gift for the Parliament and Army:

The life of this dark kingly power, which you have made an act of Parliament and oath to cast out, if you search it to the bottom, you shall see it lies within the iron chest of cursed covetousness, who gives the earth to some part of mankind and denies it to another part of mankind: and that part that hath the earth, hath no right from the law of creation to take it to himself and shut out others; but he took it away violently by theft and murder in conquest.

From The Law of Freedom in a Platform:

If they prove desperate, wanton or idle, and will not quietly submit to the law, the task-master is to feed them with short diet, and to whip them, for a rod is prepared for the fool's back, till such time as their proud hearts do bend to the law ... If any have so highly broke the laws as they come within the compass of whipping, imprisoning and death, the executioner shall cut off the head, hang or shoot to death, or whip the offender according to the sentence of law. Thus you may see what the work of every officer in a town or city is."

From The New Law of Righteousness:

Was the earth made for to preserve a few covetous, proud men to live at ease, and for them to bag and barn up the treasures of the earth from others, that they might beg or starve in a fruitful land, or was it made to preserve all her children?

== See also ==
- Agrarian socialism
- Christian anarchism
- Christianity and politics
- Christian libertarianism
- Christian socialism
- Christian views on poverty and wealth
- Diggers ("True Levellers")
- Georgism
- Geolibertarianism
- Land reform
- Left-libertarianism
- Levellers
- Libertarian socialism
- Pre-Marx socialists
- Political philosophy
- Political radicalism
- Political theology
