= David Caute =

British novelist, playwright and historian (born 1936)

(John) David Caute
- Born: 16 December 1936 (age 89); Alexandria, Egypt
- Occupations: Novelist, playwright, historian, journalist
- Spouse(s): Catherine Shuckburgh (m. 1961; div. 1970) Martha Bates (m. 1973)
- Children: 4
- Parent(s): Edward Caute, Rebecca Perlzweig
- Writing career
- Pen name: John Salisbury

John David Caute (born 16 December 1936) is a British novelist, playwright, journalist, and historian. His fiction and non-fiction have usually focused on leftist politics, often occurring outside England. He wrote a comprehensive history, The Great Fear, about the Second Red Scare in the United States. Several of his novels have been set in Africa, his place of birth and where he served in the military.

== Early life ==
Caute was born 16 December 1936 in Alexandria, Egypt. His father Edward was a British Army dentist stationed in Egypt at the time. His mother Rebecca was the daughter of Asher Perlzweig, a rabbi and noted composer. Edward died when David was eleven.

David was educated at Edinburgh Academy, Wellington College, Wadham College, Oxford, and St Antony's College, Oxford. His eighteen months of Army service in 1955–56 were spent in the African Gold Coast colony, which became the independent state of Ghana in 1957. After completing military service, he returned to England and resumed his education. In 1959, he was elected a Fellow at All Souls College, Oxford. He then attended Harvard University as a Henry Fellow from 1960 to 1961.

== Career ==
Caute has been listed in anthologies of important British novelists of the latter 20th century.

In 1959, Caute commenced his writing career with the novel At Fever Pitch. It was the first of several fictional works—the others being The Decline of the West, The K-Factor, and News from Nowhere—that used the African decolonization struggle as a backdrop to the story. His historical novel Comrade Jacob (1961), about the 17th-century Digger movement, was adapted into the film Winstanley (1975).

After writing novels primarily in a realist style, Caute started to work more in a postmodernist vein beginning with The Occupation (1972). It was part of a trilogy (dubbed The Confrontation) that included his play, The Demonstration (1970), and his work of literary theory entitled The Illusion (1971).

In the mid-1960s, Caute began turning his attention to history and biography, starting with Communism and the French Intellectuals 1914–1960 (1964), The Left in Europe Since 1789 (1966), and a 1970 profile of Frantz Fanon. He also edited The Essential Writings of Karl Marx (1967). After years of research, Caute came out with his lengthy 1978 volume, The Great Fear, which recounts the anti-Communist purges in the U.S. during the 1940s and '50s. Jim Burns wrote the following about it in Tribune: "'The Great Fear' chronicles a sad time in American history, but it's good that Caute has brought his committed and informed mind to bear on it." In the decades that followed, Caute continued to alternate between fiction and non-fiction, and he has been a Fellow at both the Royal Society of Literature and the Royal Historical Society.

In addition to authoring books, Caute has held a variety of academic positions. At the conclusion of his fellowship at All Souls College in 1965, he became a Reader in Political Theory at Brunel University. He was then appointed visiting professor at New York University, Columbia University, University of California, Irvine, and Bristol University.

In 1982, Caute co-chaired the Writers' Guild of Great Britain and served on its executive council. He was Literary Editor of the New Statesman from 1979 to 1980, and has been a regular contributor of book reviews, literary criticism, and journalistic pieces to numerous British publications.

== Works ==
Novels

- At Fever Pitch, London: Deutsch, 1959; New York: Pantheon, 1959. - winner of the Authors' Club Best First Novel Award and the John Llewellyn Rhys Prize.
- Comrade Jacob, London: Deutsch, 1961; New York: Pantheon, 1962.
- The Decline of the West, London: Deutsch, 1966; New York: Macmillan, 1966.
- The Occupation, London: Deutsch, 1971; New York: McGraw-Hill, 1972.
- The Baby-Sitters, as John Salisbury. London: Secker & Warburg, 1978; New York: Antheneum, 1978; republished as The Hour Before Midnight, New York: Dell, 1980.
- Moscow Gold, as John Salisbury. London: Futura, 1980.
- The K-Factor, London: Joseph, 1983.
- News from Nowhere, London: Hamilton, 1986.
- Veronica; or, The Two Nations, London: Hamilton, 1989; New York: Viking Penguin, 1989.
- The Women's Hour, London: Paladin, 1991.
- Dr. Orwell and Mr. Blair, London: Weidenfeld & Nicolson, 1994.
- Fatima's Scarf, London: Totterdown Books, 1998.
- Doubles, London, Totterdown Books, 2016

Non-Fiction

- Communism and the French Intellectuals 1914–1960, London: Deutsch, 1964; New York: Macmillan, 1964.
- The Left in Europe Since 1789, London: Weidenfeld & Nicolson, 1966; New York: McGraw-Hill, 1966.
- Fanon, London: Fontana Modern Masters, 1970; as Frantz Fanon, New York: Viking, 1970.
- The Illusion: An Essay on Politics, Theatre and the Novel, London: Deutsch, 1971; New York: Harper & Row, 1972.
- The Fellow-Travellers: A Postscript to the Enlightenment, London: Weidenfeld & Nicolson, 1973; New York: Macmillan, 1973; revised edition, as The Fellow-Travellers: Intellectual Friends of Communism, New Haven, CT: Yale University Press, 1988.
- Collisions: Essays and Reviews, London: Quartet Books, 1974.
- Cuba, Yes?, London: Secker & Warbung, 1974; New York: McGraw-Hill, 1974.
- The Great Fear: The Anti-Communist Purge Under Truman and Eisenhower, London: Secker & Warburg, 1978; New York: Simon & Schuster, 1978.
- Under the Skin: The Death of White Rhodesia, London: Allen Lane, 1983; Evanston, IL: Northwestern University Press, 1983.
- The Espionage of the Saints: Two Essays on Silence and the State, London: Hamilton, 1986.
- Sixty-Eight: The Year of the Barricades, London: Hamilton, 1988; as The Year of the Barricades: A Journey through 1968, New York: Harper & Row, 1988.
- Joseph Losey: A Revenge on Life, London & Boston: Faber & Faber, 1994; New York: Oxford University Press, 1994.
- The Dancer Defects: The Struggle for Cultural Supremacy During the Cold War, Oxford University Press, 2003.
- Marechera and the Colonel: A Zimbabwean Writer and the Claims of the State, London: Totterdown Books, 2009.
- Politics and the Novel During the Cold War, New Jersey: Transaction, 2010.
- Isaac and Isaiah: The Covert Punishment of a Cold War Heretic, London: Yale University Press, 2013.
- Red List: MI5 and British Intellectuals in the Twentieth Century, London: Verso, 2022

As Editor

- The Essential Writings of Karl Marx, London: MacGibbon & Kee, 1967; New York: Macmillan, 1968.

Drama

- The Demonstration: A Play, London: Deutsch, 1970. Performed at the Nottingham Playhouse, 1969, Unity Theatre, 1970, and Junges Theater, Hamburg, 1971
- The Zimbabwe Tapes, a radio drama, BBC Radio, 1983
- Henry and the Dogs, a radio drama, BBC Radio, 1986
- Sanctions, a radio drama, BBC Radio, 1988
- Animal Fun Park, a radio drama, BBC Radio, 1995
