= It Happened Here =

1964 film by Kevin Brownlow and Andrew Mollo

- 1966 UK cinema poster
- Directed by: Kevin Brownlow; Andrew Mollo
- Written by: Kevin Brownlow; Andrew Mollo
- Produced by: Kevin Brownlow; Andrew Mollo
- Starring: Pauline Murray; Sebastian Shaw; Bart Allison; Reginald Marsh
- Cinematography: Kevin Brownlow; Peter Suschitzky
- Edited by: Kevin Brownlow
- Music by: Anton Bruckner
- Distributed by: British Film Institute
- Release dates: 19 October 1964 (Cork and Mannheim); 17 May 1965 (Cannes Film Festival); 12 May 1966 (United Kingdom)
- Running time: 101 minutes
- Country: United Kingdom
- Languages: English; German
- Budget: $20,000 (estimated) or £7,000

It Happened Here (also known as It Happened Here: The Story of Hitler's England) is a 1964 British black-and-white war film written, produced and directed by Kevin Brownlow and Andrew Mollo, who began work on the film as teenagers. The film's largely amateur and independent production took some eight years, using volunteer actors with some support from professional filmmakers.

It Happened Here shows an alternative history in which the United Kingdom has been invaded and occupied by Nazi Germany during World War II. The plot follows the experiences of an Irish nurse working in England, who encounters people who believe collaboration with the invaders is for the best, while others are involved in the resistance movement against the occupiers and their local collaborators. The film's title is an allusion to Sinclair Lewis's 1935 novel It Can't Happen Here.

== Plot ==
=== Setting ===
The film opens with the statement: "The German invasion of Britain took place in 1940 after the retreat from Dunkirk." After months of fierce resistance and brutal reprisals, the occupying forces manage to restore order, largely suppressing the resistance movement. However, due to continued fierce fighting between Soviet and German forces in the Ural Mountains, most German troops are eventually removed from Western Europe to reinforce the Eastern Front. As a result, the garrisoning of Britain is largely carried out by local collaborationist volunteers and auxiliaries in the German Army and the SS.

England appears to be governed by the British Union of Fascists; the followers are referred to as "Blackshirts", wear uniforms with the Flash and Circle, and a framed portrait of Oswald Mosley appears in a government building, alongside one of Adolf Hitler. Meanwhile, the United States, having entered the war, stations its Seventh Fleet off Ireland. The Americans begin bombing raids on the southwest coast of England, as well as supplying men and equipment to a resurgent partisan movement.

=== Story ===
Set in 1944–1945, the story focuses on an apolitical Irish district nurse, Pauline. Following an upsurge in partisan activity in her area, she is forcibly evacuated from her village by the Germans and their collaborators and witnesses an attack on German forces by a group of British partisans, during which a number of her friends from the village are killed in the crossfire. The attack (and more particularly the deaths) influences her subsequent views and decisions.

She is evacuated to London, where she reluctantly becomes a collaborator, joining the medical wing of the Immediate Action Organisation (IAO), a quasi-paramilitary medical corps, and is re-trained as an ambulance attendant. Although at first reluctant and intent on remaining apolitical, Pauline begins to show the effects of fascist indoctrination in her behaviour. It is a reunion with old friends (an antifascist doctor and his wife) that gives Pauline pause, and when she subsequently discovers they are harbouring an injured partisan, she reluctantly agrees to help.

Gradually Pauline learns more about the impacts of the German occupation, and she sees her friends arrested. The discovery of her association with the antifascist couple by her superiors in the IAO leads to her demotion and transfer to another part of the country. She welcomes the move at first, as her new job appears to have less of the paramilitary trappings. However, Pauline discovers that she has unwittingly taken part in a forced euthanasia programme and killed a group of foreign forced labourers who had contracted tuberculosis.

The film ends with Pauline being arrested after protesting and refusing to continue; but before she can be put on trial, she is captured by the resurgent British Resistance and agrees to work for them as they fight to liberate the country with the help of arriving American troops. In the finale, Pauline tends a group of wounded partisans while, out of her view, a large group of soldiers from the "Black Prince Regiment" of the British Legion of the Waffen-SS who had surrendered are summarily shot.

== Production ==
The film was directed by Kevin Brownlow, who later became a prominent film historian, and Andrew Mollo, who would later become a leading military historian. Brownlow developed the concept of the film when he was 18 years old, in 1956. He turned to Mollo, a 16-year-old history buff, to help him with the design of costumes and sets. Mollo was intrigued by the project, and became his collaborator. The film was in the making for the next eight years.

It Happened Here was shot in black and white on 16 mm film, giving it a grainy newsreel appearance, though no actual stock footage was used. Most of the equipment used in the production was borrowed. The audio quality and lighting on the opening reel are rather poor, which makes the dialogue difficult to follow for the first few minutes. The scenes set in Salisbury in the earlier part of the film were photographed and edited by Peter Watkins. Stanley Kubrick, who was intrigued by the project, donated film stock from Dr. Strangelove to Brownlow to help him finish the film. Veteran wartime BBC radio announcers Alvar Lidell and John Snagge gave their services free to voice reconstructed newsreels and radio broadcasts. Support was also given by director Tony Richardson, who helped to pay for the final production.

The film had an estimated cast of 900, all volunteers, with several professional actors, among them Sebastian Shaw and Reginald Marsh. A number of the extras in the film were members of British science fiction fandom, and a portion was previewed at a science fiction convention in Peterborough. Many of the British fascists in the film were themselves former members of the British Union of Fascists, and similarly, German ex-servicemen portrayed SS and Wehrmacht soldiers and airmen. The key role of Pauline, a nurse evacuated from Salisbury to London, was played by Pauline Murray. The film was partially shot in Grim's Dyke. Though the cast was almost entirely amateur, It Happened Here helped to launch the career of its cinematographer, Peter Suschitzky, who went on to work on such films as The Rocky Horror Picture Show and The Empire Strikes Back.

== Release ==
It Happened Here premiered in September 1964 at the Cork Film Festival and was shown one month later at the German Mannheim International Film Week. Some Jewish groups protested against the inclusion of seven minutes of footage of a British fascist speaking against the Jews and for euthanasia, claiming the inclusion of this material gives a platform to unapologetic neo-Nazis despite the film's strongly anti-Nazi theme. In response, this was cut from the original release, though it was restored thirty years later, after Brownlow regained the rights to the film.

== Reception ==
After eight years of production, the film's initial release was stormy. Many people were upset by the idea that the villains in the story were not just the Nazis but their British collaborators. The film seemed to be saying that fascism can rise anywhere under the right circumstances, and that people everywhere could fall under its spell.

Bosley Crowther of The New York Times wrote: "The acting by unfamiliar people is beautifully natural and restrained, particularly that of Pauline Murray in the principal role. Through her human and subtle generation of an ungrudging sympathy, one becomes involved in her dilemma and is caught up all the way in the despair, uncertainty and terror of her experiences."

=== Awards ===
- 1964: International Filmfestival Mannheim-Heidelberg, Preis der Volkshochschul-Jury (Prize of the Adult Education Center's Jury)
- 1966: National Board of Review of Motion Pictures, Top Ten Films

== How It Happened Here ==
In 1968, Brownlow published the story of the making of the film under the title How It Happened Here. The book (new edition published March 2007, by UKA Press, ISBN 978-1-905796-10-6) describes the making of the film It Happened Here, and the subsequent reception that the film received. In addition to explaining how two teenage boys made a feature film, it also explores the social issues raised by the movie. The book contains almost 100 pictures, mostly stills from the film, and an introduction by David Robinson.

== See also ==
- Hypothetical Axis victory in World War II – a common concept of alternate history
- Auxiliary Units
- It Can't Happen Here – a 1935 novel by Sinclair Lewis about a fascist government in the United States
- Operation Sea Lion in fiction
- List of films shot over three or more years
- The Plot Against America by Philip Roth
- SS-GB
- Fatherland
- The Man in the High Castle
- Enemy at the Door
