= William Everard (Digger) =

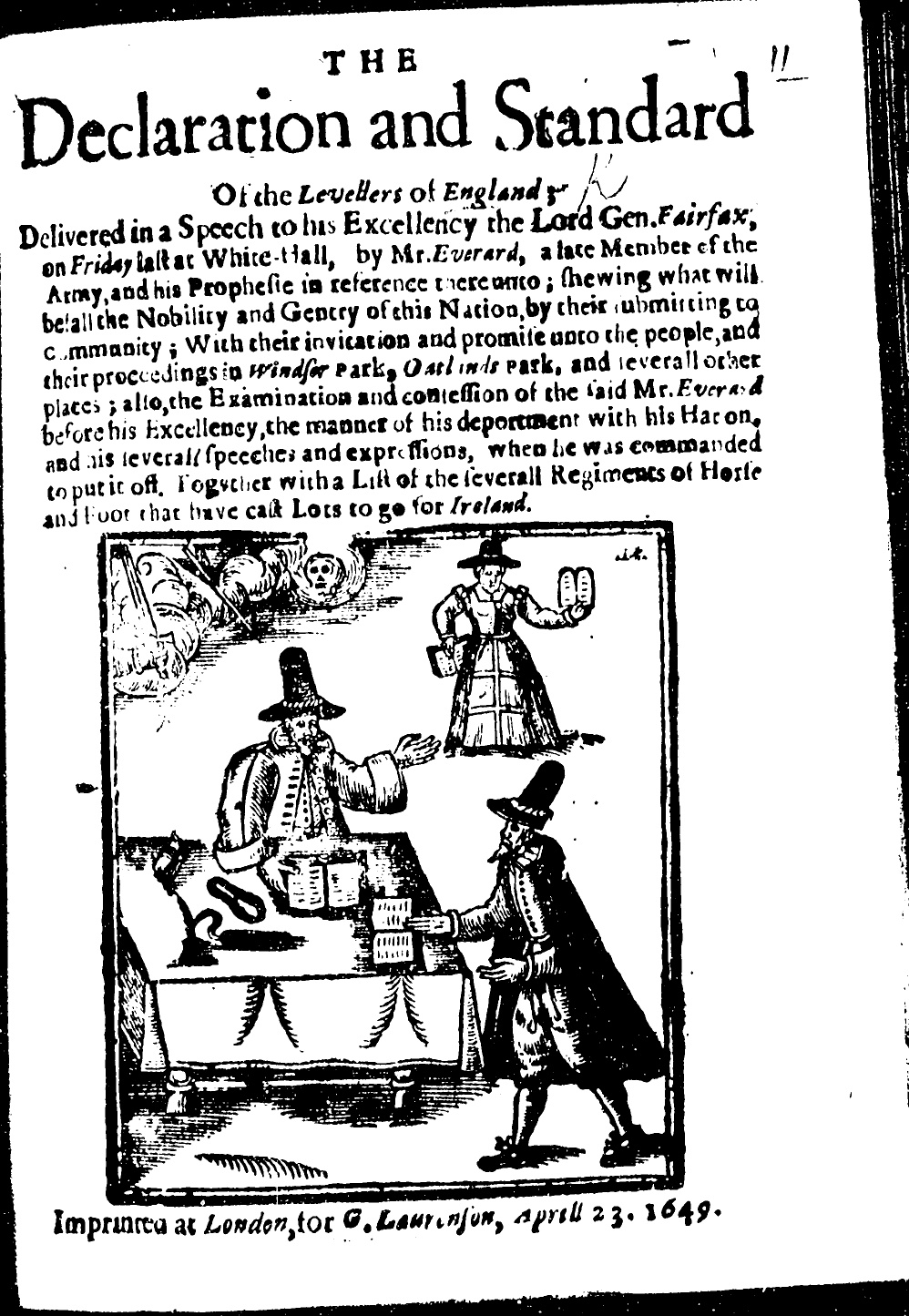
Woodcut from a Diggers document by William Everard.

William Everard (bap. 1602, d. in or after 1651) was an early leader of the Diggers.

== Biography ==
William Everard was apprenticed on 14 August 1616 to Robert Miller of the Merchant Taylors' Company, London. He was the son of William Everad, a yeoman of Reading and had been baptized on 9 May 1602 in the parish of St Giles, Reading, as William Evered. This Everad took the Protestation Oath in the parish of St Lawrence, Reading on 20 February 1642. Less than a year later a William Everard was serving as a Parliamentary scout for Sir Samuel Luke in the Berkshire and Oxfordshire area. Hessayon speculates that he may have been captured by the Royalists as there is no record of him until May 1647 when an ensign by the name of William Everard signed a petition voicing the grievances of the army under the command of Sir Thomas Fairfax. He was cashiered out of the army in late 1647 or early 1648 for plotting to kill Charles I.

In 1648 he was briefly imprisoned in Kingston, Surrey, for causing a disturbance, and Gerrard Winstanley wrote Truth Lifting up its Head above Scandals in his defence. In March 1649 he appeared before a Justice of the Peace for causing a disturbance in Staines Church.

Early the next month (April 1649) Everard went to St George's Hill, Weybridge, Surrey with four others and joined the Diggers commune. By the end of the week they had been joined by about thirty others. The group called themselves True Levellers, before the month was out complaints had been made to the Council of State over their behaviour. A troop of cavalry was sent to disperse the group and escorted Everard and Winstanley the acknowledged leaders to London to see General Fairfax. They appeared before him on 20 April and famously refused to remove their hats in his presence (an act that, at that time, was seen as showing a lack of respect for his authority). They justified their commune's actions to him using the same arguments as they presented in the Diggers first manifesto, The True Levellers Standard Advanced, which was published around the same date. Everard's name appeared as one of the subscribers on the first manifesto, but that was his last involvement with the group.

In May, contemporary newspapers and pamphlets reported that William Everard was mixed up in the Levellers inspired Burford Mutiny, but this seems to have been a case of mistaken identity with the army agitator, Captain Robert Everard.

In August 1649 Everard was reported to be in the parish of Bradfield, Berkshire the rector of which was John Pordage. Pordage had been curate and vicar of St Lawrence, Reading so they may have been old acquaintances. At the end of the next summer Everard returned to the parish as a harvest worker. There was serious disruption in the village, with people running around in trances and acting in strange ways. The local population accused Everard of being a conjurer or witch (and so presumably considered to be ultimately responsible).

Later the same month Everard was in London where he was seen to be in a "frantick posture". Shortly afterwards (in October 1650) he was detained and imprisoned in Bridewell on the instructions of the Council of State as they thought his rantings to be affected (see Ranters). He was not the only one so detained and the end of December it was reported "many of Ranting Everard's party are lunatick, and exceedingly distracted; they talk very high against the Parliament, and this present Government; for which some of them have received the lash". During the next few months Everard's behaviour deteriorated and, as his wife had previously requested, in March 1651 he was moved to Bethlem Hospital for his and others protection. What happened to him after that is unknown.
