= Andrew Mollo =

British expert on military uniforms

- Born: 15 May 1940 (age 86); Epsom, Surrey
- Relatives: John Mollo (brother), Boris Mollo(brother)

Academic background
- Education: Regent Street Polytechnic

Academic work
- Discipline: History
- Sub-discipline: Modern European history; military uniform history

Andrew Mollo (born 15 May 1940 in Epsom, Surrey, England) is a British expert on military uniforms, which has led him into a career in motion pictures and as an author of various books on military uniforms.

== Biography ==
Andrew Mollo is the son of a Russian father and British mother and the brother of costume designer and historical consultant John Mollo. In 1956, the family moved to London, where he studied at the Regent Street Polytechnic.

== Film ==
In the late 1950s Mollo was approached by Kevin Brownlow for assistance regarding the development of his film It Happened Here. Initially, he was to advise on German uniforms but became so interested in the project that ended up co-writing, co-directing and co-producing the movie. The film took eight years to make and premiered in 1964.

Mollo worked for Woodfall Film Productions as a runner and then assistant director on 1960's Saturday Night and Sunday Morning and 1962's Loneliness of The Long Distance Runner.

Mollo's uniform expertise led him to create Historical Research Unit with his brothers. This provided film companies with advice on military history, especially uniforms. In 1965 Mollo worked as the technical advisor on Doctor Zhivago.

In the early 1970s Mollo wrote a number of books on military history and uniforms. He then worked again with Kevin Brownlow on the film Winstanley which he co-wrote, co-produced and co-directed. As a German-uniform consultant Mollo advised on films such as The Eagle Has Landed (1977), The Pianist (2002) and Downfall (2004).

He later undertook the role production designer for the 1985 film Dance With a Stranger. He also designed all 14 episodes of TV series Sharpe and Hornblower.

Mollo has written a number of books on 20th-century military uniforms, focusing on the uniforms of World War II and Nazi Germany.

== Filmography (partial) ==
- 1964: It Happened Here
- 1965: Doctor Zhivago
- 1965: The Spy Who Came In From The Cold
- 1967: The Night of the Generals
- 1968: Where Eagles Dare
- 1976: Winstanley
- 1976: The Eagle Has Landed
- 1985: Dance With a Stranger
- 1986: Nanou
- 1993: Sharpe
- 2001: Conspiracy
- 2002: The Pianist
- 2004: Downfall

== Bibliography (partial) ==
- Andrew Mollo: Daggers of the Third German Reich 1933-1945 1967, Historical Research Unit
- Andrew Mollo and Malcolm McGregor: Naval, Marine and Air Force Uniforms of World War II 1975 ISBN 978-0713707250
- Andrew Mollo & Pierre Taylor: Army Uniforms of World War 1. Arco Publishing, New York 1978 ISBN 978-0713715330
- Andrew Mollo: Uniforms of the SS. The Crowood Press, 1998, ISBN 978-1859150481
- Andrew Mollo: The Armed Forces of World War II. Little, Brown & Company, 2002, ISBN 978-0316858977
