= Diggers =

Group of Protestant agrarian socialists in 17th-century England

True Levellers
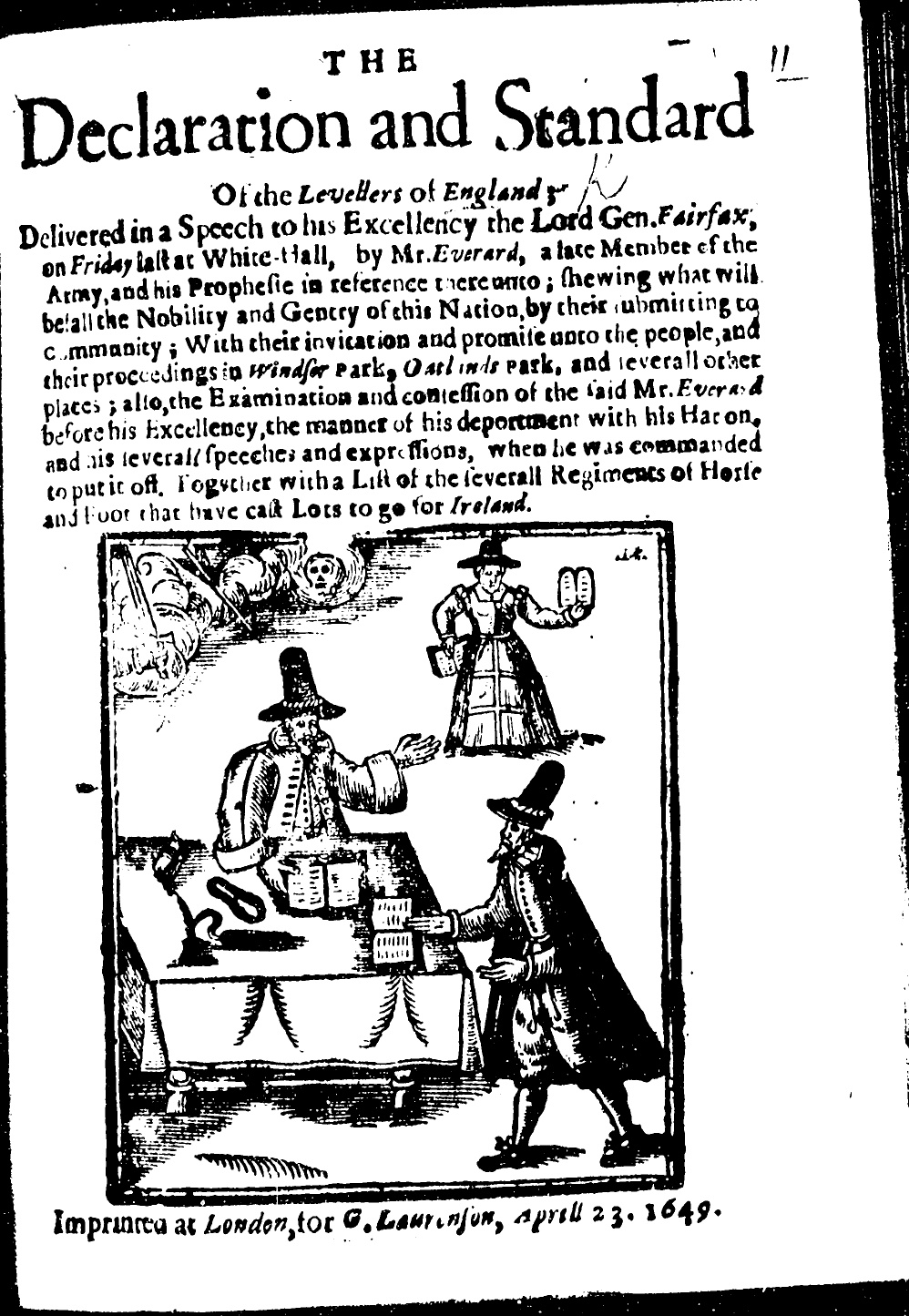
- Woodcut from a Levellers document by William Everard
- Leader: Gerrard Winstanley
- Founded: 1649
- Dissolved: 1651
- Split from: Levellers
- Ideology: Agrarianism; Utopian socialism Radicalism; Proto-anarchism; Republicanism; Universal suffrage Populism
- Political position: Left-wing
- Religion: Dissenter Protestantism

The Diggers were a group of religious and political dissidents in England, associated with a political ideology and programme resembling what would later be called agrarian socialism. Gerrard Winstanley and William Everard, amongst many others, were known as True Levellers in 1649, in reference to their split from the Levellers, and later became known as Diggers because of their attempts to farm on common land. Due to this and to their beliefs, the Diggers were driven from one county after another by the authorities.

The Diggers tried (by "levelling" land) to reform the existing social order with an agrarian lifestyle based on their ideas for the creation of small, egalitarian rural communities. They were one of a number of nonconformist dissenting groups that emerged around this time. Their belief in economic equality was drawn from Acts of the Apostles 4:32, which describes a community of believers that "had all things in common" instead of having personal property.

== Theory ==
In 1649, Gerrard Winstanley and 14 others published The True Levellers Standard Advanced, a pamphlet and manifesto in which they called themselves "True Levellers" to distinguish their ideas from those of the Levellers. Once they put their idea into practice and started to cultivate common land, both opponents and supporters began to call them "Diggers". The Diggers' beliefs were informed by Winstanley's writings which envisioned an ecological interrelationship between humans and nature, acknowledging the inherent connections between people and their surroundings; Winstanley declared that "true freedom lies where a man receives his nourishment and preservation, and that is in the use of the earth". With this the Diggers sought to establish a communistic utopia.

The True Levellers advocated for an early form of public health insurance and communal ownership in opposition to individual ownership. They rejected the perceived immorality and sexual liberalism of another sect known as the Ranters, with Gerrard Winstanley denoting them as "a general lack of moral values or restraint in worldly pleasures".

== Practice ==
=== St George's Hill, Weybridge, Surrey ===
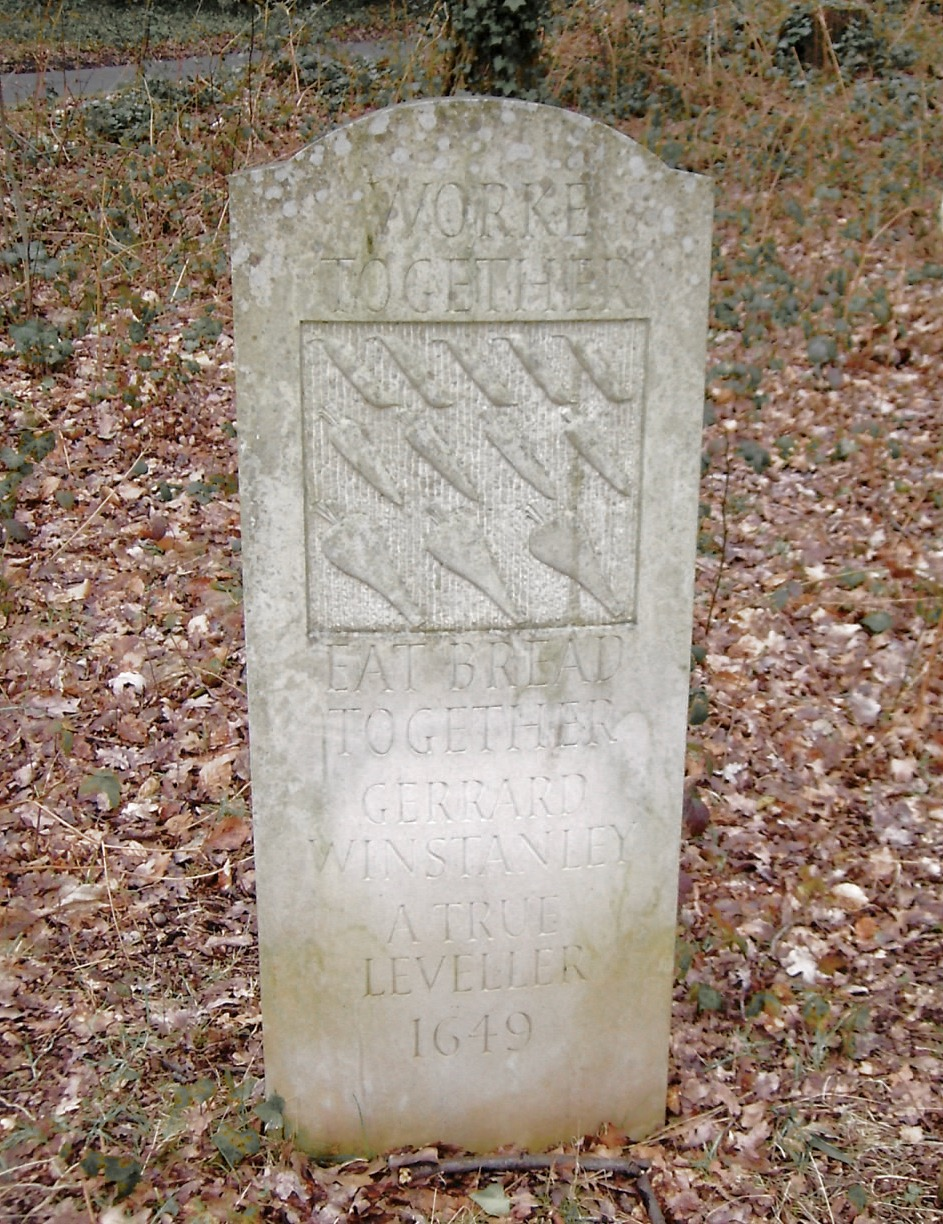
A memorial to Gerrard Winstanley, located close to Weybridge railway station, was unveiled in December 2000.

The Council of State received a letter in April 1649 reporting that several individuals had begun to plant vegetables in common land on St George's Hill, Weybridge near Cobham, Surrey at a time when harvests were bad and food prices high. Sanders reported that they had invited "all to come in and help them, and promise them meat, drink, and clothes". They intended to pull down all enclosures and cause the local populace to come and work with them. They claimed that their number would be several thousand within ten days. It was at this time that The True Levellers Standard Advanced was published.

Where exactly in St. George's Hill the Diggers were is a matter of dispute. Sanders alleges that they worked "on that side of the hill next to Campe Close". George Greenwood, however, speculated that the Diggers were "somewhere near Silvermere Farm on the Byfleet Road rather than on the unprofitable slopes of St. George's Hill itself".

Winstanley remained and continued to write about the treatment they received. The harassment from the lord of the manor, Francis Drake (Note: Not the famous Francis Drake, who had died more than 50 years before.), was both deliberate and systematic: he organised gangs in an attack on the Diggers, including numerous beatings and an arson attack on one of the communal houses. Following a court case, in which the Diggers were forbidden to speak in their own defence, they were found guilty of being sexually liberal Ranters (though in fact Winstanley had reprimanded Ranter Laurence Clarkson for his sexual practices). If they had not left the land after losing the court case then the army could have been used to enforce the law and evict them; so they abandoned Saint George's Hill in August 1649, much to the relief of the local freeholders.

=== Little Heath near Cobham ===
Some of the evicted Diggers moved a short distance to Little Heath in Surrey. 11 acres (4.5 ha) were cultivated, six houses built, winter crops harvested, and several pamphlets published. After initially expressing some sympathy for them, the local lord of the manor of Cobham, Parson John Platt, became their chief enemy. He used his power to stop local people helping them and he organised attacks on the Diggers and their property. By April 1650, Platt and other local landowners succeeded in driving the Diggers from Little Heath.

=== Wellingborough, Northamptonshire ===
This community was probably founded as a result of contact with the Surrey Diggers. In late March 1650, four emissaries from the Surrey colony were arrested in Buckinghamshire bearing a letter signed by the Surrey Diggers including Gerrard Winstanley and Robert Coster inciting people to start Digger colonies and to provide money for the Surrey Diggers. According to the newspaper A Perfect Diurnall the emissaries had travelled a circuit through the counties of Surrey, Middlesex, Hertfordshire, Bedfordshire, Buckinghamshire, Berkshire, Huntingdonshire and Northamptonshire before being apprehended.

On 15 April 1650 the Council of State ordered Mr Pentlow, a justice of the peace for Northamptonshire, to proceed against "the Levellers in those parts" and to have them tried at the next Quarter Session.

=== Iver, Buckinghamshire ===
Another colony of Diggers connected to the Surrey and Wellingborough colony was set up in Iver, Buckinghamshire about 14 miles (23 km) from the Surrey Diggers colony at St George's Hill. The Iver Diggers' "Declaration of the grounds and Reasons, why we the poor Inhabitants of the Parrish of Iver in Buckinghamshire ..." revealed that there were further Digger colonies in Barnet in Hertfordshire, Enfield in Middlesex, Dunstable in Bedfordshire, Bosworth in Leicestershire and further colonies at unknown locations in Gloucestershire and Nottinghamshire. It also revealed that after the failure of the Surrey colony, the Diggers had left their children to be cared for by parish funds.

== Response ==
Oliver Cromwell and the Grandees' attitude to these groups was at best ambivalent and often hostile.

== Influence ==
The San Francisco Diggers were a community-action group of activists and Street Theatre actors operating from 1966 to 1968, based in the Haight-Ashbury neighborhood of San Francisco.

Since the revival of anarchism in the British anti-roads movement, the Diggers have been celebrated as precursors of land squatting and communalism. On 1 April 1999, the 350th anniversary of the Diggers' occupation of the English Civil War on the same hill, The Land Is Ours organised a rally, then occupied land at St. George's Hill near Weybridge, Surrey.

In 2011, an annual festival began in Wigan to celebrate the Diggers. In 2012, the second annual festival proved a great success and the sixth took place in 2016. In Wellingborough, a festival has also been held annually since 2011. Bolton Diggers were established in 2013 and have promoted the commons as a foil to privatisation. They have established community food gardens, cooperatives and the Common Wealth café, a pay-what-you-want café using surplus food from supermarkets. The Manchester Urban Diggers, which operate out of Platt Fields Gardens, takes its name and ethos from the historical diggers, and supports developing food sovereignty through "educational services and growing fruit, vegetables and herbs to make available to the local community".

=== Influence on literature and popular culture ===
- In 1966, a faction of the San Francisco Mime Troupe formed the Diggers group in the hippie community in the Haight–Ashbury district of San Francisco. A strongly anti-establishment group, they handed out free food in Golden Gate Park.
- "The World Turned Upside Down" by Leon Rosselson, 1975, a song about the Diggers and their activities on St. George's Hill in 1649; this song was also performed by numerous other artists, including:
  - Dick Gaughan on his album Handful of Earth, 1981
  - The Barracudas on their album Endeavour to Persevere, 1984
  - Billy Bragg on his Between the Wars EP, 1985
  - Chumbawamba on the b-side of their single Timebomb, 1993
  - Four to the Bar on Another Son in 1995
  - Attila the Stockbroker with Barnstormer on The Siege of Shoreham, 1996
  - Oysterband on their albums Shouting End of life and Alive and Shouting, 1995 and 1996
  - Karan Casey (formerly of the Irish band Solas), on her album Songlines, 1997
  - Clandestine, a Houston-based Celtic group, on their album To Anybody at All, 1999
- Winstanley, a fictionalised 1975 film portrait of the Diggers, directed by Kevin Brownlow, was based upon the novel Comrade Jacob by David Caute.
- As Meat Loves Salt by Maria McCann, Harcourt, 2001 (ISBN 015601226X) deals in part with the founding and destruction of a fictional Digger colony at Page Common near London.
- Caryl Churchill's 1976 play Light Shining in Buckinghamshire, named after the Digger pamphlet and set in the English Civil War, charts the rise and fall of the Diggers and other social ideas from the 1640s.
- Charlie Kaufman's 2020 novel Antkind references Winstanley and the Diggers. A character called "Digger" is given a copy of The True Levellers Standard Advanced in order to motivate her to revolt against an oppressive government.

== Writings ==
- Truth Lifting up its Head above Scandals (1649, dedication dated 16 October 1648), Gerrard Winstanley
- The New Law of Righteousness (26 January 1649), Gerrard Winstanley
- The True Levellers Standard ADVANCED: or, The State of Community opened, and Presented to the Sons of Men William Everard, John Palmer, John South, John Courton. William Taylor, Christopher Clifford, John Barker. Gerrard Winstanley, Richard Goodgroome, Thomas Starre, William Hoggrill, Robert Sawyer, Thomas Eder, Henry Bickerstaffe, John Taylor, &c. (20 April 1649)
- A DECLARATION FROM THE Poor oppressed People OF ENGLAND, DIRECTED To all that call themselves, or are called Lords of Manors, through this NATION... Gerrard Winstanley, John Coulton, John Palmer, Thomas Star, Samuel Webb, John Hayman, Thomas Edcer, William Hogrill, Daniel Weeden, Richard Wheeler, Nathaniel Yates, William Clifford, John Harrison, Thomas Hayden, James Hall. James Manley, Thomas Barnard, John South, Robert Sayer, Christopher Clifford, John Beechee, William Coomes, Christopher Boncher, Richard Taylor, Urian Worthington, Nathaniel Holcombe, Giles Childe (senior), John Webb, Thomas Yarwel, William Bonnington. John Ash, Ralph Ayer, John Pra, John Wilkinson, Anthony Spire, Thomas East, Allen Brown, Edward Parret, Richard Gray, John Mordy, John Bachilor, William Childe, William Hatham, Edward Wicher, William Tench. (1 June 1649).
- A LETTER TO The Lord Fairfax, AND His Councell of War, WITH Divers Questions to the Lawyers, and Ministers: Proving it an undeniable Equity, That the common People ought to dig, plow, plant and dwell upon the Commons, with-out hiring them, or paying Rent to any. On the behalf of those who have begun to dig upon George-Hill in Surrey. Gerrard Winstanly (9 June 1649)
- A Declaration of The bloudie and unchristian acting of William Star and John Taylor of Walton (22 June 1649), Gerrard Winstanley
- An Appeal To the House of Commons; desiring their answer: whether the common-people shall have the quiet enjoyment of the commons and waste land; ... (11 July 1649), Gerrard Winstanley, John Barker, and Thomas Star
- A Watch-Word to the City of London, and the Armie (26 August 1649), Gerrard Winstanley
- To His Excellency the Lord Fairfax and the Counsell of Warre the Brotherly Request of those that are called Diggers sheweth (December 1649), John Heyman, An. Wrenn, Hen. Barton, Jon Coulton (in the behalf of others called the Diggers), Robert Cosler, John Plamer, Jacob Heard (in The Clarke Papers volume 2, [1894])
- To My Lord Generall and his Councell of Warr (8 December 1649), Gerrard Winstanley (in The Clarke Papers volume 2, [1894])
- The Diggers Song (c. 1649,1650) (in The Clarke Papers volume 2, [1894]), attributed to Gerrard Winstanley by the historian C. H. Firth, the editor of The Clarke Papers.
- The Declaration and Standard of the Levellers of England, delivered in a speech to His Excellency the Lord Gen. Fairfax, on Friday last at White-Hall ..., William Everard
- Several Pieces gathered into one volume (1650, Preface dated 20 December 1649), A second edition of five of Gerrard Winstanley's works printed for Giles Calvert, the printer for nearly all the Diggers writings.
- A New-yeers Gift FOR THE PARLIAMENT AND ARMIE: SHEWING, What the KINGLY Power is; And that the CAUSE of those They call DIGGERS (1 January 1650), Gerrard Winstanley
- Englands Spirit Unfoulded or an incouragement to take the Engagement ... (Ca. February or March 1650), Jerrard [sic] Winstanley.
- A Vindication of Those Whose Endeavors is Only to Make the Earth a Common Treasury, Called Diggers (4 March 1650), Gerrard Winstanley
- Fire in the Bush (19 March 1650), Gerrard Winstanley
- An appeale to all Englishmen, to judge between bondage and freedome, sent from those that began to digge upon George Hill in Surrey; but now are carrying on, that publick work upon the little heath in the parish of Cobham..., (26 March 1650), Jerard [sic] Winstanley [and 24 others]
- A Letter taken at Wellingborough (March 1650), probably written by Gerrard Winstanley.
- An Humble Request, to the Ministers of both Universities, and to all Lawyers in every Inns-a-court (9 April 1650), Gerrard Winstanley
- Letter to Lady Eleanor Davies (4 December 1650), Gerrard Winstanley
- The Law of Freedom in a Platform, or True Magistracy Restored (1652), Gerrard Winstanley

== See also ==
- Christian anarchism
- Christian communism
- Christian socialism
- Covenanters
- Pre-Marxist communism

== Bibliography ==
- Campbell, Heather M., ed. (2009). The Britannica Guide to Political Science and Social Movements That Changed the Modern World. The Rosen Publishing Group. pp. 127–129. ISBN 978-1615300624.
- Gurney, John (2007). Brave Community: The Digger Movement in the English Revolution. Manchester University Press. ISBN 978-0719061035. JSTOR j.ctt155j5m4. OCLC 470777221.
- Johnson, Daniel (1 December 2013). "Winstanley's Ecology: The English Diggers Today". Monthly Review. Archived from the original on 6 October 2021.
- Laurence, Ann (February 1980). "Two Ranter Poems". The Review of English Studies. 31 (121) (New Series ed.): 56–59 [57]. doi:10.1093/res/xxxi.121.56. JSTOR 514052.
- Marshall, Peter H. (1993). "The English Revolution". Demanding the Impossible: A History of Anarchism. London: Fontana Press. pp. 96–107. ISBN 978-0-00-686245-1. OCLC 1042028128.
- Stearns, Peter; Fairchilds, Cissie; Lindenmeyr, Adele; Maynes, Mary Jo; Porter, Roy; Radcliff, Pamela; Ruggiero, Guido, eds. (2001). Encyclopedia of European Social History: From 1350 to 2000. Vol. 3. Charles Scribner's Sons. ISBN 0-684-80577-4.
- Vann, Richard T. (January–March 1965). "The Later Life of Gerrard Winstanley". Journal of the History of Ideas. 26 (1): 133–136. doi:10.2307/2708404. JSTOR 2708404.
- Winstanley, Gerrard; Jones, Sandra (2002) [1649]. The True Levellers Standard ADVANCED: or, The State of Community opened, and Presented to the Sons of Men. R.S. Bear. "That we may work in righteousness, and lay the Foundation of making the Earth a Common Treasury for All, both Rich and Poor, That every one that is born in the Land, may be fed by the Earth his Mother that brought him forth, according to the Reason that rules in the Creation. Not Inclosing any part into any particular hand, but all as one man, working together, and feeding together as Sons of one Father, members of one Family; not one Lording over another, but all looking upon each other, as equals in the Creation."
- Woolrych, Austin (2002). "Quest for a Settlement". Britain in Revolution 1625–1660. Oxford University Press. pp. 434–460. ISBN 0-19-820081-1.
