= John Saddington =

English writer (c.1634–1679)

John Saddington (c.1634?–1679) was a Muggletonian writer and London sugar merchant, originally from Arnesby in Leicestershire. There is a village called Saddington in Leicestershire.

== Spiritual journey ==
John Saddington was popularly known as Saddington the Tall and was noted for his striking good looks. He says that as a child he delved into books at every opportunity. His family were of the Presbyterian faith. He became unsettled when, as an eighteen-year-old, he read a book called A sword troubled, or, The Terror of Tythes in which ministers who took tithes were criticised as "oppressors of the poor and robbers of God." He says, "I was lost in myself as these ministers in whom I put my trust were such as took tythes." After that, "the assurance of my salvation was all I looked after." Yet neither Presbyterian, Independent nor Baptist satisfied him. He admits he would have been persuaded by the Quakers if he had heard of them first but he later rejected them because "they will not acknowledge the resurrection of the body of Christ."

He first heard of John Reeve and Lodowicke Muggleton from an apprentice friend who had met the pair in Bridewell gaol. He borrowed a copy of John Reeve's A Transcendent Spirituall Treatise and was convinced.

He seems to have been one of the first adherents to the Muggletonian faith and, as a consequence, liked to style himself "the eldest son of the Commission of the Spirit" and "An Ancient Believer". Certainly, he was one of the most loyal of believers and spoke out on behalf of Muggleton's point of view during the rebellion of 'The Nine Assertions', engineered by William Medgate, a London scrivener, from January 1671. Muggleton was unable to defend himself as he was on the run from an arrest warrant and living in hiding amongst the watermen of Wapping.

The revolt was about Nine Assertions, said by William Medgate to have been made by Lodowicke Muggleton, and which were thought to deviate from the true prophecy revealed to John Reeve. Reeve and Muggleton were believed to be the Two Last Witnesses mentioned in the Book of Revelation 11:3 but only Reeve had received his commission from the voice of God. So it was always arguable whether there were two equal prophets or only one fully commissioned prophet, John Reeve. The nine assertions might be thought to boil down to only one (that's certainly the way Muggleton looked at it) which concerned Muggleton's insistence that God takes no notice of everyday goings-on in this world. This idea is not found explicitly in any of John Reeve's writings. In fact, everything John Reeve said pointed in the opposite direction. "Nothing comes by chance or fortune, but all through or by the providential choice of the most high." Muggleton was quite candid about the situation. He said that although John Reeve was generally infallible in matters of doctrine, he was only human and could sometimes get things confused. This was one of those things and John Reeve had accepted Muggleton's correction. But we only have Muggleton's word for that.

The idea about immediate notice (or the lack of it) was not originally Muggleton's. It was first written about by Laurence Clarkson. It perhaps strengthened Muggleton's hand that someone who might have been expected to follow John Reeve was so emphatically in-line with Muggleton on the issue. And it is why John Saddington started to write books.

== "The Articles of True Faith" ==
John Saddington wrote six works in all; four circulated in manuscript and two were printed.

The Articles of True Faith is just a pamphlet, first published in 1675, said to have been printed anew in 1830 and definitely reprinted in 1880. John Saddington's seventeenth century text must have been highly valued by late-Victorian Muggletonians if they wanted to have it in print in preference to their own collective effort The Faith and Practice of the Muggletonians written in 1870 but not, as yet, published.

The work is written in the style of a personal credo with each of 48 articles beginning "I do believe that ... " The dedication to the work says it is written to confound and disprove all despisers that say, firstly, "We do not know what we believe" and secondly, that the Muggletonians "do own neither God nor devil." The first charge, that of lacking internal consistency, was a commonplace of sectarian disputes. Quakers taunted Muggletonians with it and Lodowicke Muggleton threw it back at any "ignorant spatter-brained Quaker" who crossed pens with him. The hugely abusive style of the exchange of pamphlets seems to derive entirely from a personal trait of Lodowicke Muggleton, not emulated by his followers. It is fair to say that Quakers such as Isaac Pennington, William Penn and George Fox, paid him back as good as he gave. John Reeve's correspondence with Isaac Pennington is far more measured and persuasive and, from a Muggletonian perspective, the last word had already been written long before in Laurence Clarkson's definitive The Quakers Downfall (1659).

The charge of not acknowledging God or devil was really an attempt to smear Muggletonians as unreconstructed Ranters. It is true Muggletonians do not accept the idea of the devil as a distinct personality but as a 'seed' present, to a greater or lesser extent, in all human beings. Muggletonians could only be said not to own a God in the sense that they regarded the man Christ Jesus as being the Holy One of Israel. Again, this formula was not original to Muggleton. It had appeared in Tobias Crisp's Christ alone exalted (1643).

For the most part, John Saddington does not say anything in forty eight articles which Lodowicke Muggleton had not said in six principles. A God exists beyond the stars. He is a glorious body, in form like a man from all eternity. He created the angels from stardust, like to himself in form but not in nature. Angelic satisfaction was withheld from one angel who fell to earth as the serpent tempter. Dust and water existed for eternity and creation gave them form. Thus was Adam created by breath of life and by the word. Yet, John Saddington comes into his own in two places.

In articles 33 to 38, he sets out the Muggletonian belief that all human bodies and all souls are mortal and must die, eventually to face either a glorious resurrection or a second death when time is brought to an end. As a result, the body and soul of the man Christ Jesus died and lay in the grave just like any other man except that his flesh was incorruptible for the man had been sinless. Article 36 says, "I do believe that Christ was a quickening spirit and that He did quicken out of death to life by His own power." As a result, says article 34, "I do believe that no other blood but the blood of the eternal God could wash away the sins of the elect." But only the elect. At the end of time, the candidates for resurrection will be separated as the sheep and the goats.

In articles 19 to 25, John Saddington discusses the doctrine of the two seeds; the seed of the woman and the seed of the serpent. Article 22 says, "I do believe that the seed of the woman is the generation of faithful people, which proceed from the loins of the blessed Seth, who was the son of Adam, who was the son of God." Thus, article 25 concludes, "I do believe that the difference and opposition which ariseth between believers and unbelievers concerning their faith in God is that enmity which God said he would put between the serpent and the woman and between his seed and her seed."

But was Saddington's contribution really helpful? It is only his personal statement of belief. To the extent that these beliefs are co-extensive with the six principles of Muggletonian belief, then they are redundant. To the extent they go beyond them, they are controversial and any believer is free to accept or reject as he or she pleases. This issue becomes important in his other, much more substantial, published work, A Prospective-glass for Saints and Sinners where he enlarges upon the status of John Reeve and Lodowicke Muggleton.

== "A Prospective-glass for Saints and Sinners" ==
=== Purposes of the book ===
This book can be seen in two ways which are by no means mutually exclusive. Firstly, it is one of the few Muggletonian books addressed to non-believers. (If one accepts the view that Muggletonians had principled objections to evangelism, then Saddington's book should never have existed at all.) Saddington is well equipped to write a popular book. He has a bright, journalistic style which is appealing and, above all, he couches his comments in the everyday experience of urban tradesmen and housewives and does not begin from bible doctrine. The main text is preceded by two introductions, one to his fellow believers and one, a 'General Epistle', addressed to the 'Courteous Reader'. Secondly, it is in the address to the believers that he puts the frequently asked question 'why did I write this book?' but he never truly answers himself. It is as if he wants the Muggletonian reader to stop, consider, then tease out a deeper meaning of his or her own. When he does finally answer a question, it is the different one of why he has not written the book earlier. His reasons are that he saw little need to write whilst there was still a live prophet amongst them and because, if he wrote, he had to make reference to his own experience which he felt reluctant to do. Just what this experience was that might make his fellow believers question if he were a fit and proper person to exhort them to righteousness, he naturally doesn't say. Clearly, if we don't know, we don't need to know. And we don't. So time has healed his wound. But the prophet Muggleton was still alive when Saddington wrote his book, so what had really changed?

=== Context of the book ===
The choice of content for the book is partially influenced by events that were recent to its time of writing, notably the rebellion led by William Medgate over whether God took any notice of everyday affairs on earth. Those who championed a positive response tended to privilege John Reeve and to allege that it was Lodowicke Muggleton who was introducing new and erroneous ideas of his own fancy. They drew attention to the consequences of the dispute, especially that if God took no notice there was no court of appeal against Muggleton's supreme authority. The prophet was all-powerful and he was misusing his powers in antinomian ways. They criticised the idea that the prophet's favour could uphold a man even though he sins.

Muggleton said eight of the assertions were merely misreadings of his position and only one, the immediate notice argument, had to be confronted. To that, Muggleton's simple answer was that if people only obey the law from fear of being caught and punished then there is no honesty in the matter. The law is not written externally in books but inside everyone's own heart. "Compliance based upon fear is no moral position at all," says Professor William M. Lamont, who believes, "It is no exaggeration to say that his answer anticipates the Kantian doctrine of the autonomy of ethics."

Many critics of the Muggletonian faith did think it inconsistent to say that God takes no notice of the world yet a sentence of God's eternal damnation could be pronounced by the prophet in the expectation of some rapid confirmation of the effects of the cursing for all to see. Edward Delamaine, the Baptist brother of the Muggletonian tobacco merchant Alexander Delamaine, made exactly this point. Muggleton cursed him.

But does Muggleton's answer mean that people can be saved by their own efforts? Not at all. Those in whom the seed of the serpent predominates will find that all their well-meaning efforts will prove ineffectual. This is the seed-corn falling on stony ground. But this defence, in its turn, brings back all the old charges of Ranterism – that a sin is no sin if the intentions are pure, which is not what Muggleton wanted to say at all.

These problems are what Saddington had to cope with. It was not simply a matter of summarising uncontested principles. How does he go about it?

=== Saddington's new synthesis ===
John Saddington grounds his book, not in theology, but in the everyday concerns of urban life. He describes the mistakes people make: by alternating fits of hard work with spells of lethargy, of failing to put something by for hard times, of becoming a burden to others in old age, of working so hard whilst young that they decay before their time, and of working flat-out during the week so they are fit only to waste their money down the pub at weekends. Few tradesmen or their families would fail to recognise something in this sad catalogue. On page 42, John Saddington reminisces his own ups and downs. "Again, it is not the earning of a great deal of money in a day, or a week, that causes a man and his family to live comfortably, but the well managing of what he getteth, this I know by experience."

The choice is no stylistic quirk. It is central to his understanding of the Muggletonian message. On this earth, the elect are far from perfect. They sin and sin again. This frailty is because the seed of the serpent is always mixed in with the seed of faith. What is amiss with all this sin is not that it infringes a written law but that it disturbs the inner peace of the believer. Good conduct, then, does matter. And or this reason, Muggletonian beliefs can never fairly be called antinomian.

All sin is not equal; the elect sinner differs from the reprobate sinner. According to Saddington, Jesus died so that the sins of the elect should not permanently count against them. (p. 59) The believer's inner peace, although disturbed by sin and possibly rocked to the core by its misery, is never destroyed by it. What is present in Saddington's work, and which passed John Reeve by, is that the Jesus who shared our human predicament did so as redeemer. Man and redeemer are not two aspects of the same divine activity. The one is precisely the other.

This redemption makes each elect person a free-born man or woman. This right is undeniable and irrevocable. This is not a complacent consolation. It is a right to see reality differently once superficiality has been shrugged off. What is revealed, only believers can see. As for the remnant; the heart of this people is fat. They have eyes, not that they may see, but they may be lulled into never questioning. For Muggletonians, faith is never grounded in reason.

Right conduct preserves a middle way of inner harmony and psychic balance. The pleasures of the world are not to be avoided and condemned but they are to be seen for what they are: here "but for a season". (p. 38) Inner harmony is a foretaste of paradise to come. (p. 35)

When "the peace of a man's mind is broken and he hath no more liberty and freedom in his mind to mind the glorious things of eternity," (p. 46) then, "to steal he is afraid, to beg he is ashamed, his credit is so bad nobody will trust him and in this condition there can be no peace." (p. 47) "I know it is the heart God mindeth, not the outward appearance." (p. 58)

Distractions from inner peace are poverty, wealth and position. Anyone who seeks honour in this world cannot remain committed to the faith because the great and good will insist upon a change of ways. (p. 33) He quotes the example of Nicodemus, who must come by night. (p. 41) And those who strive for greatness will draw down upon themselves the causes of their undoing in the form of the envy and malice of others who seek their place. (p. 35) Hence, the Witnesses are not accepted by the people because the people see they are not accepted by the rulers. (p. 41) But poverty is naturally an even greater distraction. Saddington rejects the instruction to "take no care for tomorrow but let the day bring forth for itself" as being suitable only to the Apostles. (p. 45)

John Saddington deals extensively with the matter of God's appearances on this earth. He maintains these give clear evidence that God is not an infinite spirit capable of being in all earthly places at once. (p. 88) He gives supporting examples of God's appearing in the garden and asking, "where art thou, Adam?", God putting Moses in the cleft of the rock as he passes by, and God's appearance to Moses in the 'burning bush'. "Always where God is, that place is holy." (p. 89) He also answers, he believes, an objection of Psalm 139, "Whither shall I go from thy spirit or whither shall I fly from thy presence?" by saying this refers to 'God's watchman' (the law written in our hearts) which no one can escape. (p. 91) Conversely, the singular appearances of God on this earth show that there is not a divine presence other than at extraordinary times. He cites Melchizedek as one such divine appearance and the third 'angel' to come to Abraham when only two go on to Sodom. (p. 98)

Lastly, with reference to events that had only recently preceded his book, he says it is not enough to believe the doctrines, we have to believe in the prophets' commission, too.
