= A Divine Looking-Glass =

Book by John Reeve

A Divine Looking-Glass was written and first published in 1656 by John Reeve, an English prophet. A second edition, revised by Lodowicke Muggleton, was published in 1661 and from this a fifth edition (with more modern scriptural quotations) was published in 1846. It claims to be a work of holy writ and is seen to be so in Muggletonianism. Specifically, it is part of the 'Third and Last Testament of Our Lord Jesus Christ'. The first two testaments are the Mosaic law and the gospels of the Apostles in the New Testament. In the scriptural style, Reeve's book is divided into chapter and verse.

"I, John Reeve, am the last commissionated prophet that ever shall declare divine secrets" (46.3). He received his commission from God "to the hearing of the ear as a man speaks to his friend" (23.22) in February 1651. There were no visions or ecstasies. This commission identifies Reeve and his cousin, Lodowicke Muggleton, as the Two Witnesses referred to in Revelation 11:3. The context means that both men saw themselves as given a power from their God to expound scripture, God now decreeing the world to be ready to learn more of the divine secrets as the end of time draws near. This contrasts with a more usual prophetic tendency of the 1650s to identify the prophet as messenger, with the 'angel with a book' in Revelation 10.

== Background ==
The doctrine in A Divine Looking-Glass is not systematic. Nor is it the working out of a single guiding principle through all areas of life. Instead, Reeve seeks to tackle what he regards as the burning issues of the day, at a time when individuals felt great anxiety as to their personal salvation and many conflicting scriptural interpretations jostled for attention. In chapter 1 verse 4 he identifies four questions by which his book will seek to satisfy the curious. 1) Whether any creature was formed on purpose for eternal suffering? 2) Could any blame be attached to such a creature? 3) Would it not have been as advantageous to have formed all creatures for eternal happiness? 4) Whence came sin into man or angel?

== Creation, Angels and the three heavens ==
God, says Reeve, is an eternal, uncreated spiritual person, in form like a man (1.7). That man is Christ Jesus, who once walked this earth but is now glorified in heaven (1.8). This is the ancient Holy One of Israel who 'will not give his glory to another' (3.38). All other titles bestowed upon the deity are mere name-calling and refer to the divine qualities as perceived by humans. Even Reeve, though, cannot quite bring himself to say that "God the Father" is just another word for "God the Son". Most emphatically, what God is not, is an invisible spirit (1.18). That would be something Reeve considers an absurdity. To be able to act and intervene, God must possess a locus, a being. Just as God is eternal, so lifeless matter in the 'formlessness' of dust and water has existed since before time. The three heavens and our world were created from these, not from nothing-at-all. Reeve thus rejects the notion of creatio ex nihilo. Creation is the word of God breathing life into the previously lifeless dust and water (2.8). Since Reeve is loath to say evil derives from God's creation he sees it as a primal force lying in wait amongst the lifeless dust - a prototype for the Cthulhu Mythos.

The angels were the first created beings (3.1). They share the same form as human beings but possess spirits of pure reason (3.3). God's word (Logos) creates creatures, not replica gods (3.12). Neither humans nor angels share in God's natural infinity (3.27). Sadly, whilst Reeve considers the relationship between God and angels, he ignores any general interaction between angels and humankind. Reeve states that he believes it was but a short time between the creation of the angels and the creation of man. Perhaps he wishes to avoid speculation like Laurence Clarkson's Land of Nod or the Jewish Lilith.

The Serpent of Eden which tempted Eve was one of these angels (3.4). There had to be an angelic reprobate so that the angels would know their innate goodness came from God, and not out of their own natures (3.6). Satan sins, not because of what he wills but because of what God wills for him. Just as there can be no perception of light without darkness, so there can be no glory for some without shame and misery for others (5.36). Reeve does not consider why this rather worldly psychology has to exist in heaven. The angels, although created perfectly pure, require continual infusions of divine inspiration in order not to degenerate (4.26). That degeneration was what happened to the reprobate angel, Satan. Reeve does not follow the line that evil may be merely the misapplication of things intended for good.

== Reason and the right devil ==
Reeve takes the unusual step of condemning reason outright. There is never any tendency in his book to equate reason with the deity. Quite the contrary, he is certain there is no trace of reason in God because reason is just desire. Humans use reason, at least after the fall of Adam and Eve, because they see in it a technique, a trick, to obtain the satisfactions they feel they lack. Angels do likewise, although their desires are for pure things, not carnal ones. God lacks nothing, therefore he neither desires nor reasons. "all those men that call pure reason God's divine nature ... they shall find their imaginary reason nothing else but a dark tormenting fiery devil of burning envy in their own bodies" (1.23).

If reason, instead of guiding humankind, constantly leads it astray, upon what can we rely? The law as written into our consciences (4.50). It is conscience that determines actions, not free-will (14.39). And, by the implant of conscience in us, we can comprehend immortal and infinite things although not being immortal or infinite ourselves. For Reeve, what eventually defeats the earthly tyrant is his own bad conscience (42.33). Only God is subject to no law (4.18). Law is to be found in faith alone because the letter killeth but the spirit giveth life (5.47). Faith is entirely within the gift of God (1.29). Reeve does not explore the problem of the wide differences of experience of conscience between individuals. What scripture contains is spiritual mysteries, accessible by faith, but not by reason (6.5). The gospels were not written by the learned but by the enlightened (6.11). Those who employ reason may see but do not perceive, hear but do not understand. Reason is devilishness within. A right appreciation of the devil is to see it as the turmoil within ourselves.

Reeve displays little affinity for the mysticism which seeks oneness with an infinite majesty whilst still in this life. There is even less enthusiasm for moral reform. Instead, he advocates a realistic and fatalistic acceptance of the human condition as we find it (15.14). Questions like 'why do all my repentances lead to a craving to sin again' are just pointless self-recrimination (13.1). We are what we are and free-will is powerless to change this. "It is thou, O Lord Jesus Christ which wounds the souls of thy redeemed ones, through thy spiritual absence; and it is Thou who must heal them with thy glorious presence" (13.12). Why? Because that's the way divine love and free grace work. In heavenly affairs, points do not win prizes. Merit is merely worldly.

== The seed of the serpent and the seed of the woman ==
Spiritual conflict is not, as so often appears, between the ways of God and the ways of this world, but between the seed of the serpent and the seed of the woman (38.13). The woman is Eve, the first woman. The serpent is the reprobate angel who "was thrown down into this perishing world, where his desired kingdom of god-like government was prepared for him" (5.19). Eve was defiled by the serpent entering into her private parts there to make an end of himself by mixing with her womanliness and to launch a new career of evil in this world. As a result, a man-child was born to her, Cain, whose father was not Adam. The fall was none of Adam and Eve's fault. Had they possessed the power to preserve their original condition, they would have used it (30.20). Eve is to be considered as an exemplar of everything innocence should be, not as an easily deluded girl.

What, then, is all the fuss about an apple? "You cannot be so weak," says Reeve, "as to think that the law of eternal life and death depended on the eating of an apple from a natural tree." (33.22). It is not what goes into a man that defiles him, but what comes out of his heart. Thus, the tale of the apple is a mere euphemism as ancient Jewish writers were pained by overt reference to the genitals.

The curse upon Eve is temporal. That upon the serpent is eternal. The seed of the woman shall break the serpent's head. The sins of humankind are the frailties of free-will and are pardonable. That of the serpent is the sin against the Holy Ghost which is without absolution. But if Eve is not to blame, why is she cursed at all? Because that is what a knowledge between good and evil is. As to the serpent, what does it matter to him if he is cursed, seeing he was the devil in the first place?

== The reversal of time ==
John Reeve writes at a time when an interpretive understanding of the world as an order of Ideas and archetypes was giving way to something more analytical. Reeve has a foot in both old and new. But this tension is already present in the Jewish scriptures themselves. Mircea Eliade says "for the first time, the prophets placed a value on history, succeeded in transcending the traditional vision of the cycle (the conception that all things will be repeated forever) and discovered a one-way time.". All the pieces are falling into place for history's end-game. The chastisement of Adam is reversed by Christ, our second Adam. The defilement of Eve is reversed by the immaculate conception which restores purity.

For Reeve, God will surely make all things like new again. He will come as a thief in the night (47.7). And that time is now (22.12). The day of his appearing shall be like unto that of Noah (flood) and Lot (hail of fire and brimstone) (47.1). But why, if everything is to be made good again, has humanity's history of suffering been necessary? Because that is what creation means. A limitless deity creates limited creatures and knowledge is their limit. The apocalypse to come is when the awful truth to the phrase 'make the heart of this people fat' will have sunk in. Only faith saves. Following St Paul, Reeve says darkly, "who shall dare open his mouth on that day to say, Why hast thou made me thus?" (26.11)

== Scriptural Astro-physics ==
Reeve's system of astronomy is based upon scripture. It is also based upon a traditional view of matter in which earth, water, fire and air are the four elements and all substances interact according to how their 'natures' either repel each other in conflict or attract each other harmoniously.

Our "visible heaven is all the firmaments that ever were created" (7.43). But there exist two other created heavens. One is said to be a "spiritual creation within natural bodies" (8.6). The other is the third heaven cited in scripture which is "the realm of the angels and glorified bodies of Moses and Elijah" (8.4).

The bodies of the sun and moon were both formed out of water (7.45). Sun, moon and stars each possess only their own light (7.35). How, then may eclipses be explained? Reeve says "whatever men have long declared concerning the eclipse of the sun, through the near appearance of the moon, you may understand that the true occasion of the sun eclipsed, whether in part or whole, is according to their appearing at a further or nearer distance unto each other." (7.49). "harken no more unto vain astronomers or star-gazers, concerning the bulk of the sun, moon and stars, for I positively affirm from the God that made them that the compass of their bodies are not much bigger than they appear to our natural sight" (7.33).

What Reeve is describing is a sort of parallel universe (avoiding the pitfalls of reason) and a deeply psychedelic one. This is testified by the twelve beautiful plates, six illustrating the Newtonian system and six the Muggletonian, which accompany Isaac Frost's 1846 "Two systems of astronomy".

== Conclusion ==
Reeve ends his work 'forget not that the wisdom of God seeth it most advantageous for his glory to choose base and despised things to confound the honourable and eloquent things of this vain glorious world' (51.11) amongst which things he counts 'conceited wise men which through an ambition of tongues or languages, have studied beyond all sober sense, reason or wit' (25.6). One topic which became important to subsequent Muggletonianism is no more than implicit in his book. This deals with the doctrine of immediate notice which says that God neither intervenes in, nor takes notice of, the everyday events of our world. Formal worship or private prayer is equally pointless. Nowhere does he give consideration as to what he means by terms like redemption or predestination. Reeve fails to stick to the story-line provided by the whole of the Book of Revelation and it may be this which prompted Muggleton's own two commentaries upon Revelation.
