= John Biddle (Unitarian) =

English Unitarian minister (1615–1662)

Personal life
- Born: 14 January 1615 Wotton-under-Edge, Gloucestershire
- Died: 22 September 1662 (aged 47) London
- Resting place: Bedlam burial ground
- Notable work: A Two-fold Catechism
- Education: M.A. Magdalen Hall, Oxford (1641)
- Other names: John Bidle; The Father of English Unitarianism

Religious life
- Religion: English Unitarian

Senior posting
- Teacher: The Crypt School

John Biddle or Bidle (14 January 1615 – 22 September 1662) was an influential English nontrinitarian, and Unitarian. He is often called "the Father of English Unitarianism".

== Life ==
Biddle was born at Wotton-under-Edge, Gloucestershire. He studied at Magdalen Hall, Oxford, taking an M. A. in 1641. At the age of 26, he became headmaster of the Crypt Grammar School, Gloucester. The school had links to Gloucester Cathedral, and since he was obliged to teach his pupils according to the Catechism of the Church of England, he immersed himself in the study of the Bible. He concluded from his studies that the doctrine of the Trinity was not supported by the Bible, and set about publishing his own views on the nature of God.

He was imprisoned in Gloucester in 1645 for his views, but released on bail. He was imprisoned again by Parliament in 1646 and, in 1647, while he was still a prisoner, his tract Twelve Arguments Drawn Out of Scripture was published. Henry Vane defended Biddle in the House of Commons, and he was released on bail in 1648. After a short while he was again imprisoned, in Newgate, where he remained until he was freed under Parliament's 1652 Act of General Pardon and Oblivion. Biddle and the MP John Fry, who had tried to aid him, were supported by the 1649 Leveller pamphlet Englands New Chaines Discovered. Biddle was strongly attacked by John Owen, in his massive work Vindiciae Evangelicae; or, The Mystery of the Gospel Vindicated and Socinianism Examined.

He was again in trouble with the Parliament of 1654–55, which ordered his book A Two-fold Catechism seized. Motions were made against Biddle as a part of the Commons' debate on the Instrument of Government's provisions for religious liberty. They marked the moment when the house's attempts to suppress sectarian radicalism faltered. (Note: The case against Biddle was as significant as the better known case against the Quaker James Nayler in the following parliament, but is now less well known because the Biddle case was recorded in much less detail in the parliamentary diary.) Parliament was dissolved in January 1655, which ended the proceedings against Biddle, and he was released in May of that year. Biddle found himself in trouble only weeks later when the City Presbyterians decided to prosecute him using the Blasphemy Ordinance of 1648. This scared the sects (especially the Baptists) who, seeing a worrying precedent that could lead to them also being prosecuted, then rallied to his side. Oliver Cromwell exiled him to the Scilly Isles, out of the jurisdiction of any hostile English Parliaments. By exiling Biddle, Cromwell avoided a test case that could have put significant numbers of the sects at risk of prosecution. He was released in 1658. He was imprisoned once more, and became ill, leading to his death. His body was "conveyed to the burial place joyning to Old Bedlam in Moorfields near London, was there deposited by the Brethren, who soon after took care that an altar monument of stone should be erected over his grave with an inscription thereon."

A biography of Biddle by Joshua Toulmin was published in 1789.

== Works ==
- A Two-fold Catechism

He is believed to have translated the Polish Racovian Catechism into English.

== Views ==
He denounced original sin, denied eternal punishment, and translated a mortalist tract. He condemned the Ranters. He affirmed that the Bible was the Word of God and his Christology appears to be Socinian, denying the pre-existence of Christ but accepting the virgin birth. Biddle's denial of the pre-existence of Christ was the main target of works including Puritan theologian John Owen's A Brief Declaration and Vindication of the Doctrine of the Trinity (1669).

== Legacy ==
Biddle's appeal for conscience was one of the major milestones of the establishment of religious freedom in England. More recently Biddle's combination of Socinian Christology and millennialism has led to a rediscovery of his work among Christadelphians and other non-Trinitarian groups in the 1970s and 1980s.
