= William Sedgwick =

William Sedgwick may refer to:

- William Sedgwick (bishop) (1858–1948), Anglican bishop of Waiapu
- William Sedgwick (priest) (1610–1669), English clergyman of Puritan views and mystical tendencies
- William Thompson Sedgwick (1855–1921), American public health specialist
