= Saddington (surname) =

Saddington is a surname. Notable people with the surname include:

- Col Saddington (1937–2012), Australian footballer
- George Saddington (born 1905), English rugby player
- Jason Saddington (born 1979), Australian footballer
- John Saddington (c.1634–1679), Muggletonian writer and London sugar merchant
- Nigel Saddington (born 1965), English footballer
- Sharron Saddington (born 1971), English musician
- Wendy Saddington (1949–2013), Australian singer
