= John Robins (prophet) =

John Robins (fl. 1650–1652) was an English Ranter and plebeian prophet. Though imprisoned for his teachings, he avoided charges of blasphemy by signing a recantation.

== Life and work ==
Robins, a ranter, was a man of little education. By his own account, "As for humane learning, I never had any; my Hebrew, Greek, and Latine comes by inspiration". He appears to have been a small farmer, owning some land. This he sold, and, coming to London with his wife Mary (or Joan) Robins, was known in 1650 to Lodowicke Muggleton (1609–1698) and John Reeve (1608–1658) as someone claiming to be something greater than a prophet. He was commonly spoken of as "the ranters' god" and "the shakers' god", and was effectively deified by his followers.

His wife expected to become the mother of a Messiah. Robins probably viewed himself as an incarnation of the divine being; he asserted that he had appeared on earth before, as Adam, and as Melchizedek. He claimed a power of raising the dead. Robins put forward a scheme for leading a host of 144,000 persons to the Holy Land; Joshua Garment was to be his Moses for this expedition; the volunteers were prepared by a vegetarian diet of dry bread, raw vegetables, and water. Robins publicly declared that "the Lord Jesus was a weak and Imperfect Saviour, and afraid of death", unlike himself who had no fear of death. Robins acted as a cult leader and promised his followers he would lead them to the Mount of Olives in the Holy Land of Jerusalem where he would feed them on manna from heaven. He also stated he would part the water of the English channel and march his followers over dry land to bliss and safety.

On 24 May 1651 Robins, his wife, and eight of his followers were apprehended at a meeting in Long Alley, Moorfields, and jailed in the New Bridewell at Clerkenwell, where three other disciples were sent to join them. During three days they held a kind of public reception of the "gentry and citizens" who "resorted thither to dispute with them". Robins reduced his former claim to one of inspiration, and rested his hopes of salvation on the merits of our Lord; his followers stoutly maintained his higher pretensions. Among the disputants was "an Oxford scholar", who referred to the previous fanaticism of William Hacket, Edmund Coppinger, and Henry Arthington, giving this last name as Arthingworth, perhaps because among the followers of Robins was a Mary Arthingworth.

Robins remained in prison for more than ten months. On 5 February 1652, Reeve and Muggleton, who had just received their own "commissions" as prophets, visited Robins in his Clerkenwell prison, and passed sentence of eternal damnation upon him. The scene is graphically narrated by Muggleton. Robins said afterwards that he felt "a burning in his throat", and heard an inward voice bidding him recant. Accordingly, about two months later, he addressed to Oliver Cromwell, the Lord Protector of England at the time, a letter of recantation, and as a result was freed.

Afterwards, he returned to the country, repurchased his land, and lived quietly. Though he professed to expect to "come forth with a greater power", he was not heard of again.

== Vegetarianism ==
Robins was one of the earliest vegetarians in England. Robins claimed he was the third Adam and that his followers should eat a vegetable diet like Adam did before the fall of man. Robins also condemned the use of alcohol as a poisonous liquor. Robin commanded his followers to eat a strict vegetable diet and abstain from meat until they should be fed with manna from heaven. Some of his followers starved to death on this diet.

== See also ==
- Thomas Tany (1608 - 1659), a disciple of Robins.
