= William Sedgwick (priest) =

English Puritan priest (c. 1610 – c. 1669)

William Sedgwick (c. 1610 – c. 1669) was an English priest of Puritan views and mystical tendencies, known as the “apostle of the Isle of Ely” and “Doomsday Sedgwick”.

== Life ==
He was the son of William Sedgwick of London and a brother of Robert Sedgwick. He was born in Bedfordshire about 1610. He matriculated at Pembroke College, Oxford, on 2 December 1625 at the age of 15, and graduated Bachelor of Arts (BA) 21 June 1628, Oxford Master of Arts (MA Oxon) 4 May 1631. His tutor was George Hughes.

On 5 February 1634, he was instituted to the rectory of Farnham, Essex; he held the living of there until 1644, when he was succeeded by Giles Archer (instituted 27 April); but in 1642, leaving Farnham in charge of a curate, he moved to London. On 5 October 1641, a petition was made against William Fuller, dean of Ely and vicar of St Giles-without-Cripplegate, by the parishioners of Cripplegate, complaining that he had hindered the appointment of Sedgwick as Thursday lecturer at St Giles's.

In 1642 Sedgwick became chaplain to the regiment of foot raised by William Constable. In 1644 he became the chief preacher in Ely, and by his evangelism gained the title of 'apostle of the Isle of Ely'. He has been classified as a Seeker, and was ready to listen to any claims to prophetic power. A woman in the neighbourhood of Swaffham Prior, Cambridgeshire, proclaimed the near advent of the day of judgment. Sedgwick adopted her date, and announced it at the house of Francis Russell of Chippenham, Cambridgeshire (father-in-law of Henry Cromwell). Nothing happened on the predicted day, but during the night there was a storm. From this episode, Sedgwick got the name of 'Doomsday Sedgwick'.

At the end of 1647, he attended Charles I at Carisbrooke Castle with his Leaves of the Tree of Life. Charles read part of the book and gave it back, saying he thought "the author stands in some need of sleep." In 1652 he was attracted by John Reeve of the Muggletonians, and, without becoming a disciple, supported him until Reeve died. In June 1657, he explained his position in a correspondence with Reeve.

His preaching at Ely being terminated by the Restoration, he retired to Lewisham, Kent. In 1663, having conformed to the established church, he became rector of Mattishall Burgh, Norfolk. He died in London about 1669.

== Works ==
Besides two sermons before Parliament (1642 and 1643), he published:

- The Leaves of the Tree of Life, 1648.
- Some Flashes of Lightenings of the Sonne of Man, 1648; reprinted 1830.
- The Spirituall Madman ... a Prophesie concerning the King, the Parliament, 1648
- Justice upon the Armie Remonstrance, &c., 1649.
- A Second View of the Army Remonstrance, 1649.
- Mr. W. S.'s Letter to ... Thomas Lord Fairfax in prosecution of his Answer to the Remonstrance of the Army, 1649; part of this, with title Excerpta quaedam ex W. S. remonstrantia ad Generalem Exercitus, is in Sylloge Variorum Tractatuum, 1649.
- Animadversions on a Letter ... to His Highness ... by ... Gentlemen. . .in Wales, 1656.
- Animadversions upon a book intituled Inquisition for the Blood of our Soveraign, 1661.

== Sources ==
- This article incorporates text from a publication now in the public domain: "Sedgwick, William". Dictionary of National Biography. London: Smith, Elder & Co. 1885–1900.
