= Lodowicke Muggleton =

English tailor and Protestant thinker (1609–1698)

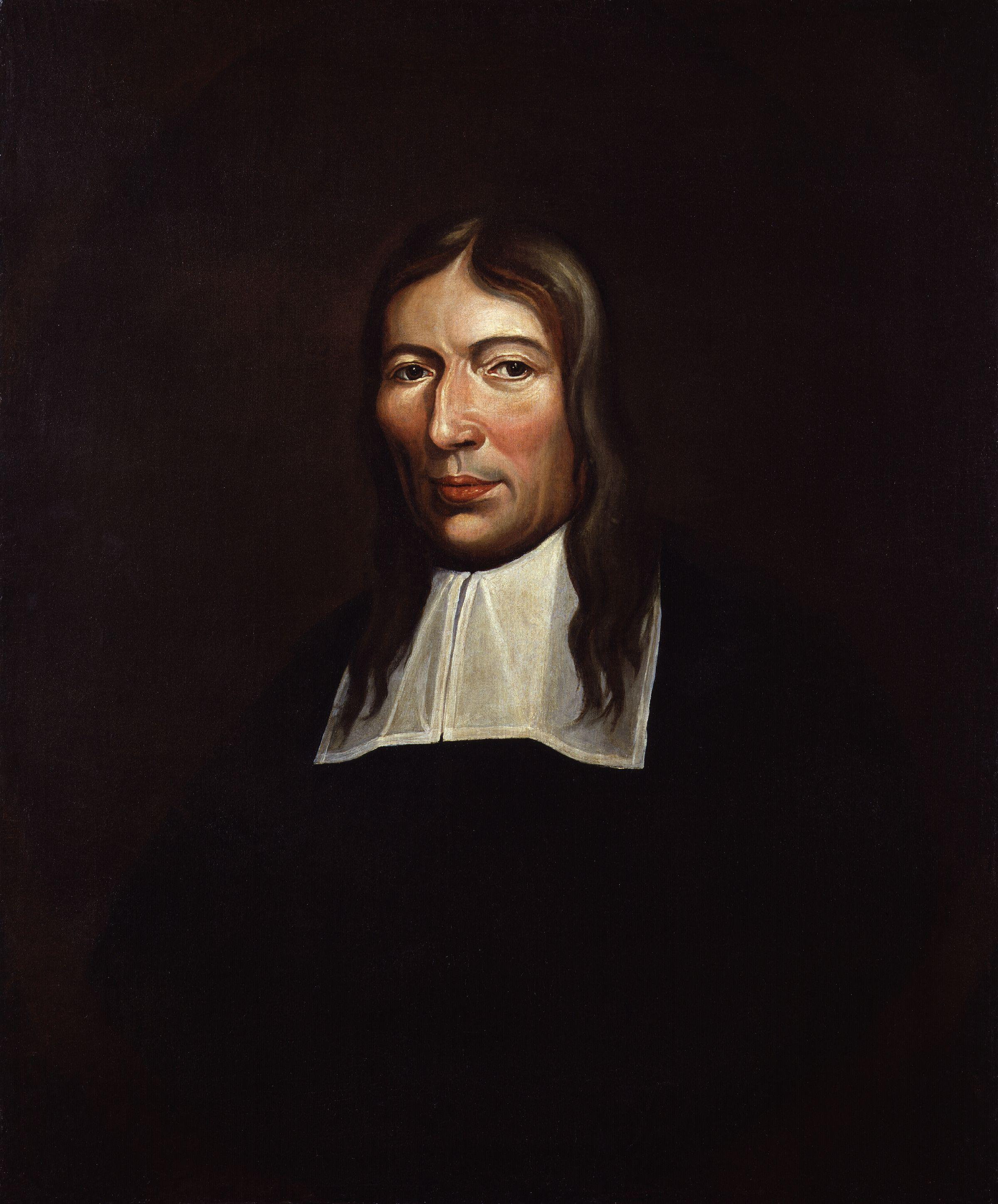
Lodowicke Muggleton, by William Wood, circa 1674

Lodowicke Muggleton (1609–1698) was an English religious thinker who gave his name to Muggletonianism, a Protestant sect which was always small, but survived until the death of its last follower in 1979. He spent his working life as a journeyman tailor in the City of London and was imprisoned twice for his beliefs. He held opinions hostile to all forms of philosophical reason, and had received only a basic education. He encouraged quietism and free-thought among his followers whose beliefs were predestinarian in a manner that was distinct from Calvinism. Near the close of his long life, Muggleton wrote his spiritual autobiography which was published posthumously.

== Childhood and apprenticeship ==
Lodowicke Muggleton was born in a house called Walnut Tree Yard on Bishopsgate Street (now Bishopsgate) in the City of London.

His father, John, was a farrier and a post office contractor. Lodowicke was the youngest of three children when his mother, Mary, died in 1612. On his father's remarriage, Lodowicke was put out to nurse in the country, the common practice in such family restructuring at the time. In 1624 he returned to Walnut Tree Yard as an apprentice to a tailor, John Quick. Quick seems to have been well-connected, making ceremonial gowns for Liverymen and Common Councilmen. Muggleton describes him as "a quiet peaceable man, not cruel to servants, which liked me very well". In 1625 Muggleton contracted the plague but, he says, "it was not extreme tedious to me. I recovered quickly, and hath not had half a day's sickness since."

As his apprenticeship drew to a close he began to disdain tailoring as poorly paid. He was offered a stake in a pawnbroker's business by a Mrs Richardson if he would marry her daughter which he seemed keen to do. But he became worried that usury would damn his soul so he remained unmarried, working as a tailor for William Reeve who was John Reeve's elder brother and, at that time, a staunch Puritan. Yet his soul was still troubled "for fear God had made me a reprobate before I was born, because He did not answer my prayers."

His first marriage, in 1635, was to Sarah and they had two surviving daughters, Sarah and Elizabeth. After his wife's death he married again, but both his second wife and the children that she bore soon died. Muggleton fell away from the Puritan faith, "for all the zeal we formerly had was quite worn out," and this cost his business dearly in terms of lost customers from that congregation.

It may be possible to recognise some subsequent Muggletonian beliefs as being solutions to the perplexities he felt while he was still a Puritan. Then again, the episodes he chooses to tell of in his autobiography may be selected with such a didactic purpose in mind. The ideas that conscience is God's watchman within every person, that the conflict between two natures is at work within everyone, and that there is a need to banish the fear of being prey to external spirits all seem to stem from personal exigencies of this period in his life.

== 1650: Ranters and prophecy ==
"It came to pass in the year 1650, I heard of several prophets and prophetess that were about the streets and declared the Day of the Lord, and many other wonderful things." Notable were John Robins and Thomas Tany (Muggleton calls him John Tannye). Muggleton says of Robins that he regarded himself as God come to judge the quick and the dead and, as such, had resurrected and redeemed Cain and Judas Iscariot as well as resurrecting Jeremiah and many of the Old Testament prophets. "I have had nine or ten of them at my house at a time," Muggleton reported. The prophets claimed power to damn any that opposed them. Robins displayed considerable talents as a magus; presenting the appearance of angels, burning shining lights, half-moons and stars in chambers, thick darkness with his head in a flame of fire and his person riding on the wings of the wind. Understandably, such experiences left a lasting impression on Muggleton. "I do not speak this from hearsay of others," Muggleton wrote in his autobiography, "but from a perfect knowledge which I have seen and heard." Yet he asserted that he was never an active follower of either man: "Yet was I quiet and still and heard what was said and done and spake against nothing."

Muggleton makes it clear that he believed Robins was guilty of self-deification and of indulging in dangerous powers when he had no grounds to consider them of divine origin. Thus Robins was a false prophet with lying signs. Yet, writing in old age, Muggleton still appreciated Robins's efficacy. Robins's curses were true for all eternity because his opponents, when they jeered at him, had no idea whether he was sent from God or not and "would have said as much to the true Christ as they did to him". Muggleton concluded that more sober persons, in whom faith predominated, "would have been preserved from speaking evil of things they knew not".

== 1651: Revelation ==
By April 1651 Muggleton had begun to feel that he lacked the power to reason his way out of his perplexities about resurrection and hellfire. He concluded that he must leave it all to God: "even as the potter doth what he will with the dead clay." He began to experience revelations concerning the meaning of scripture. The following January his cousin John Reeve underwent similar experiences. Both men thought such things for their private peace of mind alone and they resolved to make nothing public. "But contrary to the resolutions of them both, a little while after, were made the greatest medlers of religion in all the world." On 3 February 1651 (1652 in the new style or Gregorian calendar) John Reeve was addressed by the voice of God giving him the Third Commission. Lodowicke Muggleton was to be his mouth, as Aaron was to Moses. They were the two witnesses mentioned in Revelation 11:3. Thus began the sect to be known as Muggletonians. John Reeve was 42, Lodowicke Muggleton 41.

Sarah Muggleton (14 years old at the time) was the first person to be blessed under the new commission. The next task of Reeve, Muggleton and Thomas Turner (the latter presumably taken along for verification) was to pronounce sentence of eternal damnation on Thomas Tany for disobedience to the Third Commission. The following day Reeve, Muggleton and Dorcas Booth went to curse John Robins in prison. His offence, in Reeve's view, was deceiving the people. What "thou has measured to others must be measured again to thee."

== 1652–1658: Muggleton's role in the Third Commission ==
It may seem incredible to modern readers that two ordinary tailors could walk around London considering themselves to be transcendental characters out of the Book of Revelation. Christopher Hill supplies the answer when he quotes a Royalist prophet, Arise Evans, as saying (1629) that before he came to London he "looked upon the Scripture as a history of things that passed in other countries, pertaining to other persons; but now I looked upon it as a mystery to be opened at this time, belonging also to us."

Thomas Macaulay in his History of England (1849), describes Lodowicke Muggleton as "a mad tailor who wandered from pothouse to pothouse, tippling ale and denouncing eternal torments against all who refused to believe." Subsequent historians have treated this as slanderous (as it may be for the subsequent history of the faith) but it is not so different from Muggleton's own description of his early, lively adventures as a prophet. "For God's sake, Lodowick, let us be gone, else we shall be killed: so he paid for the drink and we departed out of the house and went to another a little distance off."

Throughout the period until the death of John Reeve in 1658, Muggleton seems to have acted only as Reeve's ever-present sidekick. There is no record of him writing any works of his own nor of him acting independently of Reeve. The pair were tried for blasphemy and jailed for six months in 1653/4.

== 1658–1669: A prophet alone ==
It is said that, on the death of John Reeve, there was a power-struggle between Lodowicke Muggleton and Laurence Clarkson (or Claxton) for leadership. However, it is unclear if Muggleton saw there as being a "movement" of which to be leader. William Lamont remarks that it is strange that he took three years to bestir himself in his own cause. The issue may be more a misunderstanding on Clarkson's part. In temperament and talent, he seemed much more the natural successor to Reeve than Muggleton was – or cared to be. But he wasn't a commissioned prophet. Muggleton seems only slowly to have grasped that if he wanted to be taken seriously as an individual prophet, he had to write, to publish and to show himself outside his immediate neighbourhood.

"The first thing I did after Claxton was put down, I caused A Divine Looking-Glass to be printed anew in 1661."

Secondly, he wrote his first book, The Interpretation of the Eleventh Chapter of the Revelation of St. John in 1662.

Thirdly, he began his reluctant travels to distant parts of England to meet believers who knew him only through correspondence. He did no preaching although he records acrimonious discussions with followers of Jacob Böhme. His first journey was to see Ellen Sudbury in Nottingham and Dorothy Carter in Chesterfield. This was followed by visits to believers in Cambridgeshire and Kent. Although these visits were made troublesome by local opponents (mainly Quakers) and resulted in Muggleton spending nine days in Derby gaol, the visit to Kent had a happy outcome because Muggleton married his third wife, Mary Martin, the daughter of a wealthy tanner. The marriage seems to have been an exceptionally happy one and she brought with her sufficient wealth to allow her husband to retire from tailoring, if not from prophecy. Muggleton made a further journey to these areas, and to Leicestershire, in 1669.

It was during these years that Muggleton began his polemic against the Quakers with a book The Neck of the Quakers broken (1663) and correspondence with individual Quakers, much of it published by one party or the other.

== Muggleton and the Quakers ==
Muggleton's opposition to the Quakers, and to all things Quaker, was uncharacteristically bitter for three reasons. Firstly, he believed them guilty of "spiritual witchcraft" which he saw as a manipulation of that fear from which faith should be free. Secondly, he regarded them as unreconstructed Ranters and the Ranter legacy was a delicate personal issue. Thirdly, they were the seventh, and last, anti-church of the latter days and thus their mere existence was seen as holding up everyone else's journey to paradise.

By and large, the charges Muggleton brings against the Quakers are the same as those the Quakers lay against Muggleton. As a result, the exchange of letters and pamphlets rarely rises above contradiction, quibbling and name-calling; the latter Muggleton employs with great verve.

Richard Farnesworth (1662) brusquely tells Muggleton that his commission has been faked and that he is trying to act as judge in the stead of Christ. What, he asks, has happened to the pardoning power of Christ? In turn, Muggleton asks what Quakers would have said to St. Peter after he had been given the keys to the kingdom, the power to bind and to loose, the power to remit or to retain sin, all while still a man? He jeers at Quaker "out-sputterings" so that, "Christ hath never a body of his own but is forced to make use of every Quaker's body for his spirit to dwell in."

One of Muggleton's more telling criticisms of the Quakers is that they try too hard to entice God to move in their direction, thus falling into the trap of seeing their own lights and fancies as coming to them from without. Muggleton does not allow that the Quakers themselves may have been well aware of the dangers. As a result, Muggleton dismisses Quakers as warmed-over Ranters, "for you have got your Christ all within you."

Edward Bourne asks Muggleton if the two seeds theology does not make God the harbinger of evil in the world? He does not receive a straight answer although Muggleton says that faith in a time of innocence is one thing, but that faith through knowledge of good and evil is a higher state of consciousness altogether. Thus, evil is a sort of necessary evil.

Samuel Hooten enquires if Muggleton should not pay heed to the instruction Christ gave to his disciples, "Bless and curse not"? But Muggleton dismisses this instruction as a temporary expedient for the disciples' use only. In Acts, St. Peter receives a quite different instruction and Peter, like Lodowicke, has a commission. In a similar vein, Muggleton is reminded there is nothing in scripture foretelling the coming of one Lodowicke Muggleton, to which the reply is, "For, if there had been such a name written in scripture, many men would have named their sons Lodowicke Muggleton." Richard Farnesworth also taxes Muggleton about the failure of John Reeve and himself to live out their part from the book of Revelation. Muggleton says that prophets come to impose their commission which lives on after them no matter what happens to the prophet himself. Thus, Moses commission was to bring the law and that did not end with the death of Moses but with the death of John the Baptist.

== 1669–1674: Rebellion of the Nine Assertions ==
In 1669, Muggleton's An answer to Isaac Pennington, Quaker was intercepted at the printers by the Searcher of the Press. "It came to pass, in the year 1670, before midsummer, there came fourteen men to search my house for unlicensed books." Muggleton, discovering these men to be honest and courteous, sent a bribe after them when they had gone. Being honest men, he knew they would only accept the bribe if they felt they could help him. When the bribe was returned, Muggleton knew for certain he was in serious trouble. Shortly afterwards, he was tipped off that a warrant for his arrest would be issued and he was able to disappear for nine months to live in hiding among the watermen of Wapping.

During his absence, a rebellion against his authority broke out among the believers led by a scrivener called William Medgate. The rebels alleged that Muggleton had made "nine assertions" contrary to "all sober reason". Muggleton regarded these as boiling down to one issue; whether God took notice of happenings on earth. But two other grievances seemed to be involved. Firstly, whether the prophet was using his authority to surpass the words of Christ. Secondly, whether the prophet's love could uphold believers who sinned, this being alleged to be antinomian doctrine.

John Saddington rallied the believers to stick with Muggleton and the revolt lost momentum. One of its leaders, Thomas Burton, a flax dealer, rejoined the flock.

== 1674–1698: Persecution ==
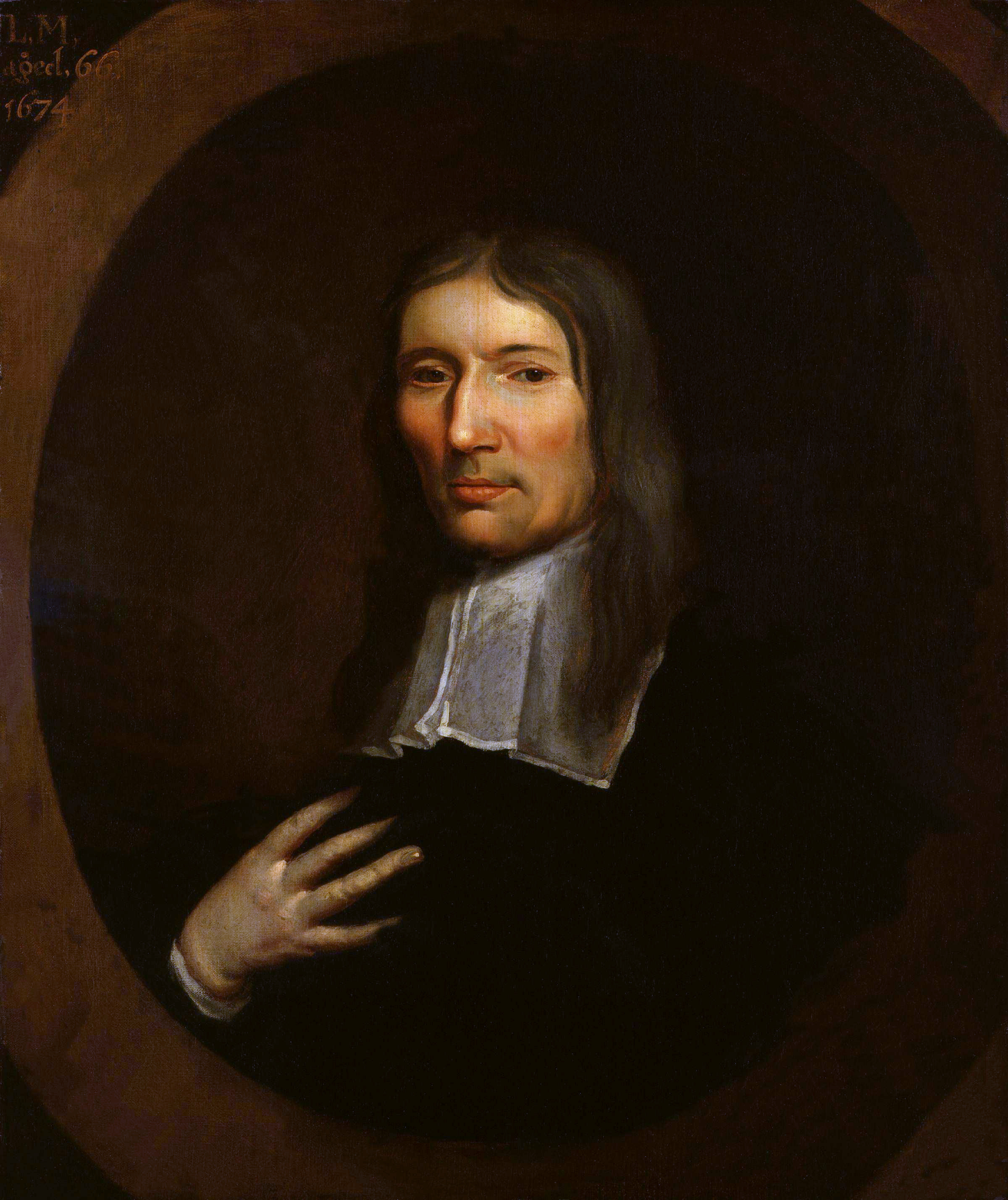
Lodowicke Muggleton, by William Wood, 1674

In 1675, Muggleton, as executor of the estate of Deborah Brunt, became involved in property litigation against Alderman John James. He seems largely to have been successful until his opponent hit upon the idea of trying to get him excommunicated in the Court of Arches so that he could no longer have defence of law in civil matters. At the time, Muggleton was in hiding at the house of Ann Lowe, a believer, from an arrest warrant of the Stationers Company. Hiding was now no longer a solution as Muggleton could be excommunicated in his absence if he did not appear and plead. On doing so, Muggleton was remanded to Guildhall Court on a warrant of the Lord Chief Justice. It was Muggleton's ill-luck that the Lord Mayor that year was a stationer. Muggleton was bailed to appear to answer charges arising from his book The Neck of the Quakers broken, specifically that he did curse Dr Edward Bourne of Worcester, therein. Muggleton remarks that it was strange that a curse against a Quaker should be considered blasphemy by the established church. Muggleton's problem was that it was common practice for recently published dissenting books to bear false dates and places of publication to escape the law. Muggleton's bore a false place (Amsterdam, not London) but a true date, some 13 years earlier, and he should have escaped prosecution. No evidence, other than innuendo, was offered by the prosecution.

On 17 January 1676 (1677 new style) Muggleton was tried at the Old Bailey, convicted of blasphemy, and sentenced to three days in the pillory and a fine of £500. At each of his three two-hourly appearances in the pillory (at Temple Gate, outside the Royal Exchange and at the market in West Smithfield) a selection of the books seized from Muggleton were burnt by the common hangman. Considerable public disturbance arose from fights between Muggleton's supporters and members of the public who felt deprived of their sport. Nevertheless, Muggleton (who was no longer a young man) was badly injured. Muggleton's attempts to get himself released from Newgate gaol were frustrated because his keepers were reluctant to let go a prisoner from whom they could derive a profit. Muggleton was advised to get Ann Lowe to sue him for debt so that a writ of habeas corpus would remove him from Newgate to the Fleet prison. Eventually, the Sheriff of London, Sir John Peak was persuaded to release Muggleton for a payment of £100 cash down.

Lodowicke Muggleton died on 14 March 1697 (1698 new style) aged 88. His third wife, Mary, died on 1 July 1718. Both were buried in the New Churchyard, Bethlem.

In 1832, some sixty Muggletonians subscribed to bring out a complete edition of The Miscellaneous Works of Reeve and Muggleton in 3 vols.

== Portraits ==
Muggleton's likeness is known. A copy of one of his books seized by the Stationers' Company and now in the Lambeth Palace Library, London is inscribed, "he had yellow hair and a ruddy complexion." His death-mask also exists, somewhat battered from attempts to take copies, in the care of the National Portrait Gallery, London. By far the most technically accomplished portrait is a miniature by Samuel Cooper now part of the Pierpont Morgan collection. Mr Morgan had bought it from a family of Derbyshire Muggletonians but it is not known how it came to be painted and, although possessing the yellow hair, does give the appearance of being a stock portrait of a Puritan type. Definitely painted from life is the work by William Wood of Braintree, who was a friend of Lodowicke Muggleton. This was done in 1692 but shows Muggleton at an earlier stage of life. It was subsequently purchased by Isaac Frost for the London congregation and now, extensively and beautifully restored, belongs to the University of Sussex. From this painting an engraving was made in 1829 by J. Kennerley at the expense of the Frost family for use as a frontispiece to publications and to be sold as a separate card. It was subsequently reproduced as a small photographic print.

From the death-mask a contemporary engraving was made by G. V. Casseel. The plate was still in the possession of the Muggletonians when Alexander Gordon visited in 1869 but was too worn to be used. A version of this engraving is reproduced on the dust jacket of The World of the Muggletonians. From the engraving, a small oil painting was made by a Muggletonian, Richard Pickersgill (possibly related to Frederick Richard Pickersgill) in 1813. Several copies existed but it seems all have been lost. Fortunately, one was photographed by Hallett Hyatt in 1913 and appears in George Williamson's book opposite page 18. Even at that time, it was clearly in a decayed state. On a visit to the British Museum, the Frost brothers were delighted to find a painting of Muggleton on display. It had been presented in 1758 and appears to have been dated 1674. Alexander Gordon was familiar with it and calls it the best of the Muggletonian paintings. It was a small oval-styled oil painting featuring head and bust and with the sitter looking to his right. It is now in the National Portrait Gallery, London to which it was transferred in 1879.

As well as the likenesses themselves, these is also a contemporary interpretation of Muggleton's appearance. Charles Leslie said, "it has been observed of great enthusiasts that their hair is generally slank, without any curl, which proceeds from a moisture of brain that inclines to folly."

== Lodowicke Muggleton on the Book of Revelation ==
Lodowicke Muggleton wrote two commentaries on the Book of Revelation. William Lamont sees the first work as part of a power struggle with Laurence Clarkson, but admits, "If Muggleton's motivation in writing his comments on Chapter XI of Revelation was to complete the doing-down of Clarkson, it is therefore, a signal failure." So there is room for doubt if this is the whole explanation. Muggleton himself says his intention is to prophesy anew: "whereby is unfolded, and plainly declared, the whole counsel of God concerning Himself, the Devil and all Mankind from the foundation of the world to all eternity. Never before revealed." Muggleton stresses he writes "without the help of other men's labours, but only as the revelation did arise in me from the seed of faith".

Hence Muggleton's first book is not a commentary upon Revelation but something new which uses Revelation as a starting point. Is Muggleton entirely prophecy? It is hard to see what value "theology" would have in a Muggletonian setting since such a project would surely be contaminated by unclean human reason.

Muggleton starts his consideration of Chapter 11 at Chapter 10, verse 8 where an angel hands John of Patmos a little book which he must eat with the command, "Thou must prophesy again." This is a direct repetition of Ezekiel's commissioning as a prophet. As Ezekiel, so John. As John, so Muggleton.

Muggleton seeks not only to explain the text of Revelation on its own terms but also to appropriate the text as a foundation for the Muggletonian faith. "Post-modernism is reader-orientated and gives readers the power of interpreting a text that, in modern terms, belongs to the author." In that sense, Muggleton is an empowered post-modern. He thought so, too. "Herein is the glory of God the more seen, in that he has chosen the weak things to bring down the strong; the foolish things to confound the wise; and the things that seem as if they were not, to bring to nought things that are." This is the Muggletonian faith working from the margins. But his important point is about the glory of God being seen more clearly in what might otherwise be mistaken as being the works of humankind. Austin Farrer says that when interpreting Revelation "we need constantly to ask ourselves, 'Would St. John admit that this is what he meant?'" and Muggleton seems to understand John perfectly at this juncture.

It is perhaps advisable to remember that there is a very real sense in which Muggleton's everyday experiences were much closer to those of John the Divine than ours are. In 1653, the weekly newspaper Mercurius Politicus sent their ace-reporter Marchamont Nedham down Bow Lane to investigate "the world of the Muggletonians". Christopher Hill tells us what he found. "Nedham took 'a citizen of worth out of Bread Street' with him, and at a chandler's shop in Great Trinity Lane, 'against one Mr Millis a brown-baker, near Bow Lane end' found 'a couple of tailors together with two women and an old country plain man of Essex ... at the top of an old house in a cockloft.' He bought a 12d pamphlet from them." Muggleton also cursed the citizen of worth, presumably free of charge.

At first sight, it might seem surprising that Muggleton is impressed by John the Divine's visions. After all, the proof that John Reeve's calling had been authentic was supposed to have been because it was by voice of God, "as a man speaks to his friend" and not by visions which might be self-deceiving. In Jewish practice of John's time, visions came through meditation upon a message and a favourite vehicle was the first chapter of the Book of Ezekiel which is a centre-piece of Revelation. John Sweet explains how the idea is handled in Revelation. When John is spoken to, it is to explain the meaning of what he has seen; just as Mary Magdalene had seen Jesus in the garden but did not recognise him until she heard his voice. When John the Divine witnesses the Lamb he sees weakness and defeat but the voice explains it all as power and victory. John is handling his own sources here. In the Book of Daniel 12:4 "But you, Daniel, shut up the words, and seal the book, until the time of the end."

== References and notes ==
Attribution:
