= J. C. Davis (disambiguation) =

J. C. Davis is a British historian.

JC Davis may also refer to:

- J. C. Davis (American football) (born 2003), offensive lineman
- J.C. Davis (guitarist) (born 1938), American guitarist, member of Hank Ballard & The Midnighters, AKA Billy Davis
- J. C. Séamus Davis

== See also ==
- Davis (surname)
