= Joseph Salmon (writer) =

English religious and political writer

Joseph Salmon (fl. 1647–1656) was a significant English religious and political writer of the middle of the seventeenth century.

== Life ==
He served in the New Model Army, leaving it in 1649. A Rout, A Rout contained criticism of the Parliamentary leadership. He was arrested in 1650, and imprisoned in Coventry, with a six-month sentence; and cashiered from the Army.

After 1650 he was for a time a minister in Kent. He left Kent and went abroad in the middle of 1655. He later emigrated to Barbados.

== A Ranter? ==
He was known to the Quaker George Fox, from 1648/9, who identified him as one of the Ranters. Who exactly the Ranters were is now a topic of scholarly debate, and it is suggested Fox may have supplied that name later; Christopher Hill considers Salmon to have belonged to the ‘mystical and quietist wing’ of the Ranters.

Salmon's last known work is Heights in Depths, from 1651, an apparent if partial recantation, written to fulfil a promise he had made to secure release from jail; he then fell silent as an author. He became a Quaker.

== Views ==
His views were pantheistic, taking an allegorical-psychological view of the interpretation of the Bible.

== Works ==
- Anti-Christ in Man (1647)
- A Rout, A Rout (1649)
- Divinity Anatomized (1649)
- Heights in Depths (1651)
