= Muggletonianism =

Christian denomination

The Muggletonians, named after Lodowicke Muggleton, were a small Protestant Christian movement which began in 1651 when two London tailors announced they were the last prophets foretold in the biblical Book of Revelation. The group grew out of the Ranters and in opposition to the Quakers. Muggletonian beliefs include a hostility to philosophical reason, a scriptural understanding of how the universe works and a belief that God appeared directly on Earth as Jesus Christ. A consequential belief is that God takes no notice of everyday events on Earth and will not generally intervene until it is meant to bring the world to an end.

Muggletonians avoided all forms of worship or preaching, and met only for discussion and socializing. The movement was egalitarian, apolitical and pacifist, and resolutely avoided evangelism. Members attained a degree of public notoriety by cursing those who reviled their faith. This practice ceased in the mid-nineteenth century. One of the last to be cursed was the novelist Sir Walter Scott.

The faith attracted public attention in 1979 when Philip Noakes left the entire Muggletonian archive of correspondence, general papers and publications to the British Library.

== Origins ==
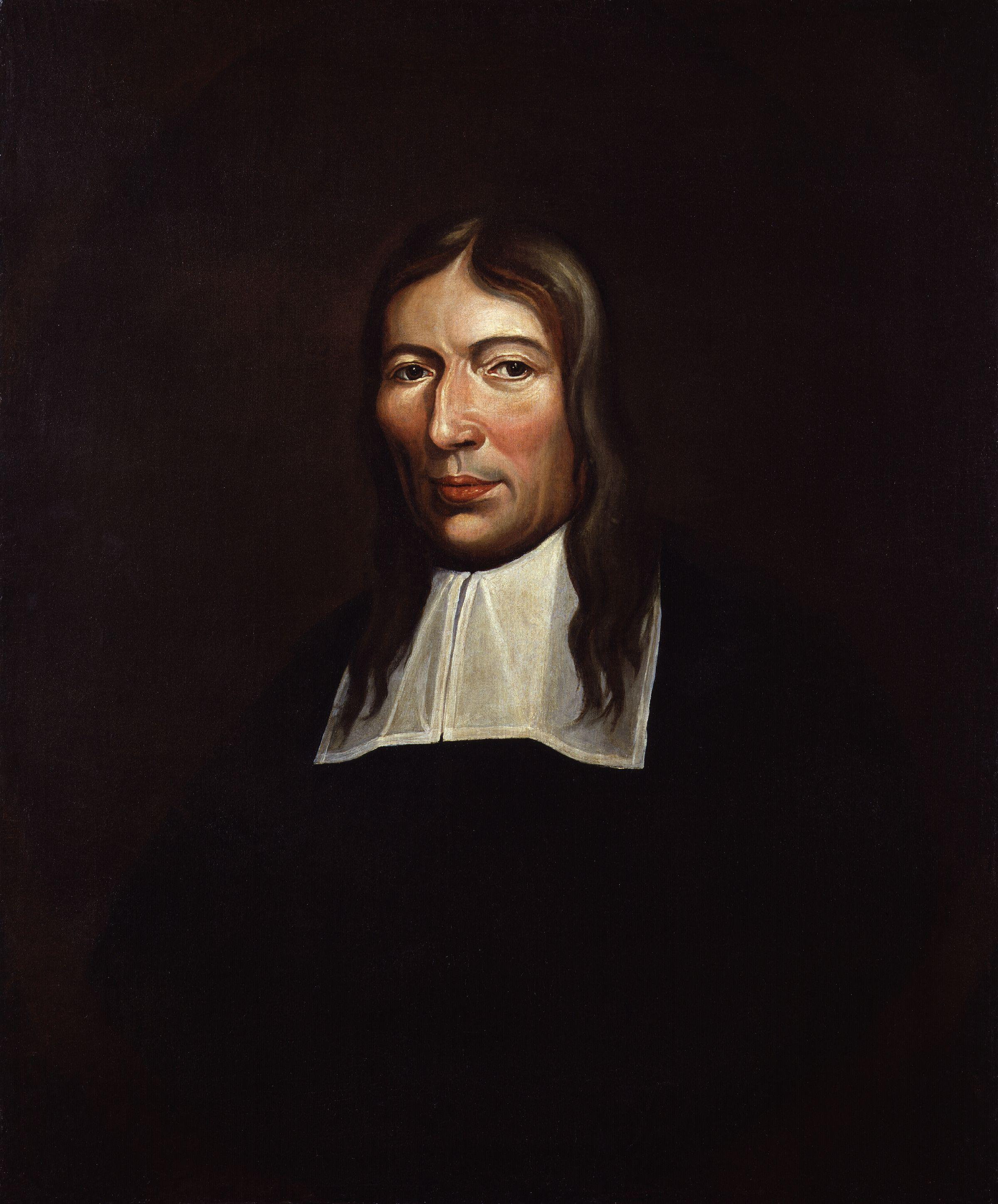
Lodowicke Muggleton, by William Wood, circa 1674

The movement was born on 3 February 1651 (old style) when a London tailor, John Reeve, claimed to receive a commission from God "to the hearing of the ear as a man speaks to a friend." Reeve was told four things:

- "I have given thee understanding of my mind in the Scriptures above all men in the world."
- "Look into thy own body, there thou shalt see the Kingdom of Heaven, and the Kingdom of Hell."
- "I have chosen thee a last messenger for a great work, unto this bloody unbelieving world. And I have given thee Lodowick Muggleton to be thy mouth."
- "I have put the two-edged sword of my spirit into thy mouth, that whoever I pronounce blessed, through thy mouth, is blessed to eternity; and whoever I pronounce cursed through thy mouth is cursed to eternity."

Reeve believed that he and his cousin, Lodowicke Muggleton, were the two witnesses spoken of in the third verse of the eleventh chapter of the Book of Revelation. After Reeve's death, Muggleton had a brief struggle for control of the group with Laurence Clarkson, a former Ranter, and subsequently with those followers of John Reeve who did not accept Muggleton's authority.

The Muggletonians emphasized the Millennium and the Second Coming of Christ, and believed, among other things, that the soul is mortal; that Jesus is God (and not a member of a Trinity); that when Jesus died there was no God in Heaven, and Moses and Elijah looked after Heaven until Jesus' resurrection; that Heaven is six miles above Earth; that God is between five and six feet tall; and that any external religious ceremony is not necessary. Some scholars think that Muggletonian doctrine may have influenced the work of the artist and poet William Blake. (Note: This is extensively argued in Thompson 1994, though the evidence has been disputed by Davies 1999.)

Recent attempts have been made to locate the movement within earlier intellectual traditions, most notably the Eternal Gospel of Joachim of Fiore. However, Dr Marjorie Reeves has examined the evidence and concludes "the case for a recognisable Joachimist influence among seventeenth-century English prophets falls to the ground." There had been at least one earlier appearance of a claim about the Two Last Witnesses, which John Reeve knew about. (Note: In A Divine Looking-Glass chap 24 verse 36, John Reeve refers to Bull and Varnum as predecessors. These were Richard Farnham and John Bull, two London weavers, who came to the conclusion in 1636 that they were the Two Witnesses. They were jailed and unable to assume their roles before their deaths.)

== Beliefs ==
The six principles of Muggletonianism were perhaps best set out by George Williamson, a Roman Catholic who visited the London Muggletonians in 1913:

- There is no God but the glorified Man Christ Jesus.
- There is no Devil but the unclean Reason of men.
- Heaven is an infinite abode of light above and beyond the stars.
- The place of Hell will be this Earth when sun, moon and stars are extinguished.
- Angels are the only beings of Pure Reason.
- The Soul dies with the body and will be raised with it.

These principles derive from Lodowicke Muggleton, who would have added one other matter as being of equal importance, namely, that God takes no immediate notice of doings in this world. If people sin, it is against their own consciences and not because God "catches them at it".

John Reeve's formulation also included pacifism and the doctrine of the two seeds (see below).

According to Rev Dr Alexander Gordon of Belfast, "The system of belief is a singular union of opinions which seem diametrically opposed. It is rationalistic on one side, credulous on another." (Note: Alexander Gordon (1841–1931) first visited the London Muggletonians as a young journalist. He gave his experiences in two lectures to the Liverpool Literary and Philosophical Society which he had printed up as The Origins of the Muggletonians (1869) and Ancient and Modern Muggletonians (1870). He became principal of the Unitarian College in Manchester between 1889 and 1911 and revisited the Muggletonians again shortly after his retirement.)

Muggletonianism was profoundly materialist. Matter pre-existed even the creation of our universe; nothing can be created from nothing. God, identified as the Holy One of Israel, is a being with a glorified body, in appearance much like a man. There can never be a spirit without a body. A purely spiritual deity, lacking any locus, would be an absurdity (so Muggletonians vehemently told the Quakers) incapable of action in a material world. The man Christ Jesus was not sent from God but was the very God appearing on this earth. Speculation about a divine nature and a human nature, or about the Trinity, is not in error so much as unnecessary. At worst, John Reeve said, it encourages people to ascribe to the deity a whole ragbag of inconsistent human attributes expressed as superlatives. Or, as Thomas Tomkinson drily remarked, it tends to give you a father of justice just when you most wanted a son of mercy.

The Devil, on the other hand, should not be likened to a character from a Ben Jonson play. When the one reprobate angel was tossed from heaven to earth, he perished, but not before impregnating Eve so that Cain was born to perpetuate his frustrated rage upon this earth. The natural process of generation ensured that, even by the time of Noah, all humans had within themselves something from Seth and something from Cain. Muggletonians call this the doctrine of the two seeds: the seed of the woman and the seed of the serpent. The former promoted faith within us, the latter promoted reasoning and desire. This is the conflict within every person. This is a predestinarian belief but, because there are two seeds and not one, humanity is not rendered abject and the innocence of Adam and Eve still has a chance of coming to the top within modern humankind.

Reason stems from desire and lack. Reason is not seen as a sublime mental process but as a rather shoddy trick humans use to try to get what they misguidedly imagine they want. Angels are creatures of Pure Reason because their only desire is for God so that their lack will be totally satisfied over and over again. The reprobate angel was not at fault. God deliberately chose to deprive this angel of satisfaction so that, by his fall, the other angels would become aware that their perfection came from God and not from their own natures.

Professor William M. Lamont sees 17th-century Muggletonianism as an early form of liberation theology. Because there are no spirits without bodies, there can be no ghosts, no witches, no grounds for fear and superstition and no all-seeing eye of God. Once persons are contented in their faith, they are free to speculate as they please on all other matters. God will take no notice. And Muggletonian meetings did just that.

The Muggletonian canon is generally taken to comprise:

- The books of the Christian Old & New Testaments except those traditionally ascribed to Solomon, whose wisdom is seen as worldly rather than inspired. Crucially, this deletes Ecclesiastes. Muggleton expressed doubts about the Book of Job but it is too much of a favourite to remove. Thomas Tomkinson advances a neat compromise, "though the authority of the book is questioned by some, yet all admit it to be a true history."
- The writings of the prophets of the Third Commission: A Transcendent Spiritual Treatise (1st Ed. 1652), A Divine Looking-Glass (1st ed, 1656) and other works
- The Book of Enoch (Ethiopic Enoch or 1 Enoch). Muggletonians did not produce their own edition but did reprint Signification of the proper names occurring in the Book of Enoch from the Hebrew & Chaldee Rev D. A. De Sola. Finsbury: Isaac Frost (1852). Similarly, The Book of the Secrets of Enoch (Slavonic Enoch or 2 Enoch) which was introduced into English by Robert Henry Charles in 1896 would qualify.
- The Testaments of the Twelve Patriarchs, from an English version of Robert Grosseteste's 13th-century Latin translation, printed from the 1693 edition with its introduction plus a modern glossary. Whitechapel: Joseph Frost Snr (1837).

However, Muggletonians had a distaste for scriptural literalism. One of the purposes of the third commission was to make clear what was previously held obscure in scripture. Their approach to scripture incorporated quite explicit interpretation and separated texts into positive and privative.

== Muggletonian meetings ==
Professor Lamont styles the Muggletonians "disorganized religion". They held no annual conferences, never organised a single public meeting, seem to have escaped every official register or census of religion, never incorporated, never instituted a friendly society, never appointed a leader, spokesperson, editorial board, chairperson for meetings or a single committee. Their sole foray into bureaucracy was to appoint trustees for their investment, the income from which paid the rent on the London Reading Room between 1869 and 1918. Philip Noakes may not have been the last Muggletonian, but he was certainly the last trustee.

Muggletonian meetings were simple comings-together of individuals who appeared to feel that discussion with like-minded believers helped clarify their own thoughts. "Nothing in the Muggletonian history becomes it more than its fidelity to open debate (though sometimes rancorous)."

Records and correspondence show that meetings took place from the 1650s to 1940 in London and for almost as long in Derbyshire. Regular meetings occurred at other places at other times. Bristol, Cork, Faversham and Nottingham are among those known, and there were many others, especially in East Anglia and Kent.

In both London and Derbyshire, two types of meetings were held. There were regular discussion meetings and there were holiday meetings of a more celebratory nature held in mid-February (to commemorate the start of the Third Commission) and at the end of July (to remember Muggleton's release from imprisonment).

There remains a description of a Muggletonian holiday meeting held at the Reading Room at 7 New Street, London on 14 February 1869. There were about 40 members present, of whom slightly more than half were men. One-quarter were said to have been born into the faith. Tea was served at 5 o'clock. Discussion continued until 6 when a lady sang "Arise, My Soul, Arise" one of the Muggletonian divine songs. (Note: An updated version of the Divine Songs had been compiled and published by Joseph Frost in 1829. The words were by Muggletonians and the tunes were traditional. Sadly the appropriate tune is not always recorded. The words when read from the page are doggrel but, when sung to the correct tune, come over very well indeed. They are not hymns of praise because God takes no notice. William Ewart Gladstone (whose hobby was collecting hymnals) requested a copy of the songbook and recorded in his diary that he was reading it. A facsimile of the book is available from Kessinger.) Then a large bowl of port negus with slices of lemon was served and a toast enjoined to absent friends. More songs were sung by each who volunteered. Beer was brought in and supper was served at half past eight. "It was a plain substantial meal; consisting of a round of beef, a ham, cheese, butter, bread and beer. Throughout the evening, every one seemed heartily to enjoy himself or herself, with no lack of friendliness, but with complete decorum." No speeches were made. "By ten o'clock all were on their way homeward." (Note: The meeting was several months before the date given on the plaque for the opening of the Reading Room.) About 30 Muggletonians enjoyed at least one seaside outing to Hastings after the First World War.

There is also an account for a far older holiday meeting which Lodowicke Muggleton and his daughter, Sarah, attended in July 1682 at the Green Man pub in Holloway, then a popular rural retreat to the north of London. In addition to a goodly meal with wine and beer, a quartern of tobacco, one-fifth of a pound, was gotten through and a shilling paid out to "ye man of the bowling green".

Outside of holiday times, meetings seem to have altered little with time and place. They comprised discussion, readings and songs. There was no public worship, no instruction, no prayer. There is no record of any participant being moved by the spirit. Until mid-Victorian times, London meetings were held in the back rooms of pubs. In the early days, this is said to have provided an appearance of outward conformity with the Conventicle Acts 1664 and 1667. The meeting would look and sound to outsiders like a private or family party. Nothing would advertise religious observance. By 1869, pub life had become irksome and the London congregation obtained their first Reading Room at 7 New Street, which was reckoned to be built on the former site of Lodowicke Muggleton's birthplace, Walnut Tree Yard. This was made possible by legacies from Catherine Peers, Joseph Gandar and the Frost family; all of whom had been active in the faith. The money invested in government stock yielded sufficient income to pay the rent and the wages of a live-in caretaker who, for most of the Victorian period, was an unemployed shoe-repairer named Thomas Robinson. 7 New Street is perhaps the only site with Muggletonian connections still extant. However, it may require considerable historical imagination from the modern passer-by to gain a mental picture of what it would have been like in Victorian times. Then, the area was full of warehouses and factories, not the smart, professional consultancies of today. (Note: The Ordnance Survey map of 1873 (Godfrey Edition, London sheet 63, 1873) shows the neighbours to have been the 6th division police station, London & St Katherine's Dock Warehouses, the Clothes Market and old clothes exchange as well as Broad Street and Liverpool Street railway stations, the latter under construction.) For his visit in 1913, Williamson tellingly describes it as being "in the East End". (Note: As of Christmas 2008, the building was tenantless and undergoing rewiring and redecoration. As the suspended ceilings were down, it was possible for the uninvited visitor to see that the front room on the first floor is most definitely the scene of the Muggletonian Reading Room photographed by Hallett Hyatt in 1913.)

By May 1918, wartime inflation seems to have undermined the Victorian financial settlement. (Note: However, E. P. Thompson suggests otherwise. He says the Muggletonians were bombed out by enemy air raid. This is possible. The Aldgate area was badly hit by Zeppelin attack in the aftermath of the long-remembered "Theatreland raid" of the night of October 13, 1915. But there is no record of New Street being hit.) The Muggletonians moved to cheaper rented premises not far away at 74 Worship Street, to the north of Finsbury Square. (Note: This address no longer exists but it would have been just to the west of the junction of Paul Street and Worship Street. Several rather mean Georgian houses survive elsewhere in Worship Street and it might be surmised that number 74 once looked like these.) They remained there until probably the autumn of 1940 when the building was destroyed by a firebomb during the London Blitz. This was the event which led to the transfer of the Muggletonian archive to Mr Noakes's farm in Kent. As a fruit farmer, Mr Noakes received a petrol ration to take his produce to Covent Garden market in central London. On the return journey, the archive was packed into empty boxes and taken to safety.

== The Two Witnesses ==
John Reeve reports that only he was told of his Commission by the word of God. Yet two persons, Lodowicke Muggleton and John Reeve, are appointed the Last Witnesses to fulfil the prophecy of Revelation 11:3 where no distinction is drawn between one witness and the other. John Reeve introduces a distinction of his own. "And I have given thee Lodowicke Muggleton to be thy mouth: at that very moment the holy spirit brought into my mind that scripture of Aaron given unto Moses." Whilst Reeve was alive, we have no evidence that anyone took Lodowicke Muggleton very seriously except as Reeve's assistant. At their blasphemy trial in 1653, The Recorder of London, after examining John Reeve, turns to Muggleton and says, "Let Aaron speak". Certainly, Muggleton appears to have written nothing whilst Reeve was alive. After first attempting to take control, Clarkson eventually submitted to Muggleton completely, even agreeing to give up writing and keeping that promise.

Revelation say the Two Witnesses:

- Possess power and to prophesy 1260 days whilst clothed in sackcloth.
- Are the two olive trees and the two candlesticks.
- Will kill their enemies by fire from their mouths.
- Can inflict droughts and plagues and turn water to blood during their prophesying.
- Shall be killed by the Beast and their bodies lie unburied in the street of a great city for three and a half days whilst the people will rejoice "because these two prophets tormented them".
- Will return to life and ascend to heaven whilst an earthquake destroys one tenth of the city. With that "the Second Woe is past and behold the Third Woe cometh quickly".

Muggleton and Reeve's two predecessors, the weavers Richard Farnham and John Bull, did try to live out their script, particularly in their role as bringers of plagues. However, there is no evidence that John Reeve and Lodowicke Muggleton felt in any way obliged to follow suit. Contemporaries did comment adversely upon this, especially upon the death of Reeve from all-too-natural causes followed by his equally mundane funeral at the New Bethlehem Burial grounds.

== Later history ==
The Muggletonians had a belief that they could damn and bless according to the will of God and the apparent success of such damning (apparently resulting in the death of certain religious, mainly Quaker, opponents) brought the sect great notoriety. A vigorous tract war ensued with their Quaker opponents that lasted until the death of Muggleton.

William Maitland's 1739 edition of A History of London gives two Muggletonian meeting-places. One, for the Southwark congregation, is in Barnaby Street. (Note: believed, nowadays, to be deep below the site of London Bridge railway station.) The other, for the Aldersgate congregation, is in Old Street Square. (Note: According to the A–Z of Regency London, this was once on the present site of the Redbrick Estate to the west of the Old Street/Bath Street junction.) Presumably, both of these were public houses, rented rooms or private homes as no dedicated meeting room existed before 1869.

In "The Making of the English Working Class" E. P. Thompson says, "The Muggletonians (or followers of Ludovic Muggleton) were still preaching in the fields and parks of London at the end of the eighteenth century." Those Muggletons whose lives we know about would have rejected preaching as pointless and spiritually dangerous. Were there other groups of Muggletonians who operated differently? At present, historians cannot answer, but the possibility is there. Firstly, other denominations of that era, such as Methodists and Baptists, existed in a profusion of forms as E. P. Thompson's own index shows. Secondly, contact between those Muggletonians about whom we do know was sporadic, at best. "For example, those in Derbyshire were ignorant of the existence of any persons entertaining the same faith in London until one of their number removed thither to seek employment and, after residing there a short time, heard of the London bretheren by mere accident." Thirdly, the name existed widely in the public domain without much knowledge of what it meant. Sir Walter Scott received eternal damnation for his ignorant remarks in Woodstock. Charles Dickens incorporates All-Muggleton into Pickwick Papers. A character called Mrs Snowdrop in Douglas William Jerrold's Nell Gwynne (1833) says, "Nothing now will serve her but to go upon the stage. Tisn't my fault. I'm sure I put the pious Mr Muggleton under her pillow every night."

During the nineteenth century, this formerly non-proselytizing Protestant sect became increasingly vocal and published several books intended for general audiences. In 1846, for example, the Muggletonian Isaac Frost published Two Systems of Astronomy, a lavishly illustrated book outlining the anti-Newtonian cosmology of the Muggletonians. This activity arose from the activity of the Frost brothers (Joseph and Isaac) who, having made their fortune in the Derby Brass Foundry business, proceeded to spend significant sums on publicising their sect once the family moved to London. A great number of books were published but very few were actually sold.

Notable Muggletonian writers include Laurence Clarkson (1615–1667) an itinerant preacher born in Preston, Lancashire; John Saddington (1634? – 1679) a London sugar merchant, originally from Arnesby, Leicestershire; Thomas Tomkinson (1631–1710) a Staffordshire yeoman farmer who moved to London in the 1680s; Arden Bonell (b.? – 1746) a London Barber-Surgeon; and Isaac Frost (1793–1858) and Joseph Frost (1791–1857), brothers who ran the family metallurgy business in Clerkenwell, London. Also deserving mention is Alexander Delamaine (died 1687), a wealthy London tobacco merchant who began The Great Book in 1682, which became the Muggletonian archive. (Note: Dates for Clarkson, Saddington and Tomkinson from Underwood 1999, p. 14, 21 and 22 respectively and for the Frost brothers from Lamont 2006, p. 173.) Thomas Robinson (see above) in opposition to the Frost brothers strongly preferred the 1656 edition of A Divine Looking-Glass to Muggleton's revision of 1661 and also wrote an unpublished manuscript Upon New Thoughts circulated to Muggletonians which argues for a God in an infinite universe.

The group survived into the twentieth century. The last Muggletonian, Philip Noakes of Matfield, Kent, died on 26 February 1979; the sect's records, which he had kept, were then transferred to the British Library. Other gifts have joined the archive, most notably from Eileen Muggleton of the commonplace book of John Dimock Aspland (1816–1877). The published works of the Muggletonians are still available from Gage Postal Books of Westcliff-on-Sea, Essex.

There may be another archive still to be found. Mrs Louise Barnes of Buffalo, New York, wrote to London in 1936 about the US Muggletonian archive kept by her father, the late Alfred Hall. This collection was clearly treasured, mainly for family reasons. It may still exist.

Today, Muggletonian works (including their hymnal DIVINE SONGS) are reprinted (as hard copy and e-books) by the Muggletonian Press.

"In Edward Thompson's words, Muggletonianism was a 'highly intellectual anti-intellectualism', and as such remarkably well adapted for survival among the semi-educated, self-taught, self-confident London artisans of the seventeenth and eighteenth centuries." (Note: Perhaps it still is? Hill, Reay & Lamont 1983, p. 102 where is quoted a letter of E. P. Thompson's to the Times Literary Supplement of March 7, 1975.)

== See also ==
- Religion in the United Kingdom
- English Dissenters
- 17th century denominations in England
- Fifth Monarchy Men
