= 17th-century denominations in England =

Many religious denominations emerged during the early-to-mid-17th century in England. Many of these were influenced by the radical changes brought on by the English Civil War, subsequent Execution of Charles I and the advent of the Commonwealth of England. This event led to a widespread discussion about how society should be structured.

- Fifth Monarchists
- Grindletonians
- Muggletonians
- Ranters
- Quakers
- Seekers

== See also ==
- Anglicanism
- Anglo-Catholicism
- Brownists
- Diggers
- The Caroline Divines
- Congregational church
- English Baptists
- English Dissenters
- English Independents
- English Presbyterianism
- Gangraena
- Levellers
- Puritans
