= Laurence Clarkson =

English theologian

Laurence Clarkson (1615 – 1667), sometimes called Claxton, born in Preston, Lancashire, was an English theologian and accused heretic. He was the most outspoken and notorious of the loose collection of radical Protestants known as the Ranters.

According to Charles William Sutton, writing in the Dictionary of National Biography, 1885-1900, "the name is written Clarkson in his earlier tracts and Claxton in the later ones. It was no doubt originally Clarkson. In that form, the name is still common about Preston, where it is pronounced 'Clackson'".

Clarkson's ideas are set out in a 1650 tract sponsored by the wealthy Leveller military man, William Rainborowe, called A Single Eye. Clarkson opposed the idea of sin, considering it to be "invented by the ruling class to keep the poor in order." He felt that only the intention of an act, and nothing at all about its content, mattered to God, so that no specific morality could be prescribed on religious bases. He considered the danger of sin to be in the mind: "till acted that so called Sin, thou art not delivered from the power of sin, but ready upon all Alarums to tremble and fear the reproach of thy body." The only commandment he felt worthwhile was "Thou shalt not kill"; most of the others he confessed to having broken, and even adultery was acceptable under certain circumstances. In fact, Clarkson was known in the period for his sexual promiscuity, for which he was repudiated by the Digger Gerrard Winstanley. Clarkson considered himself to be the truest of the radical religious thinkers of the period to the Protestant ideal of separating religion from money, and accused Winstanley of taking tithes.

Some time before 1660, Clarkson left the Ranters and joined the Muggletonians (apparently to the consternation of some of the current members). Clarkson claimed to be the chief follower and disciple of John Reeve, of whom Lodowicke Muggleton was himself an acolyte, and claims in his book The Lost Sheep Found (1660) to be "the true and only bishop now living." A protracted struggle for control followed between Clarkson and Muggleton, which Clarkson lost.

J. C. Davis, who has in general expressed considerable doubt about some of the more peculiar doctrines ascribed to the Ranters, considers Clarkson to be genuine, if alone:

I have conceded that Laurence Clarkson in 1650 came closest to the Ranter stereotype, while arguing that he was an isolated individual leniently dealt with by authorities, and that his so-called autobiography of 1660, The Lost Sheep Found, is no valid source for the events of 1649-50.

Though considerable controversy has followed from Davis's dismissal of the canonical account of the Ranters, that controversy has not been over the content of Clarkson's ideas, which are by and large agreed on by all parties to the debate, but merely the extent of their influence.

He died in 1667 whilst imprisoned for debt.

== Major surviving works ==
- Truth released from prison to its former liberty, 1646.
- A Generall Charge or, Impeachment of High-treason, in the Name of Justice Equity, Against the Communality of England, 1647.
- A Single Eye, All Light, No Darkness; or Light and Darkness One, 1650.
- The Quakers Downfal, with All Other Dispensations their Inside Turn’d Outward, 1659.
- The Right Devil Discovered: in his Descent, Form, Education, Qualification, Place and Nature of Torment, 1659.
- The Lost Sheep Found, or, The Prodigal Returned to his Fathers House, After Many a Sad and Weary Journey Through Many Religious Countreys, 1660.
- A Paradisical Dialogue Betwixt Faith and Reason: Disputing the High Mysterious Secrets of Eternity, the Like Never Extant in our Revelation, 1660.
- A modern edition containing the last four works mentioned above is The Onely True Bishop: The Muggletonian Works of Laurence Clarkson London: Muggletonian Press (2009) ISBN 978-1-907466-02-1
- works believed lost include
  - The Pilgrimage of Saints, by church cast out, in Christ found, seeking truth, 1646.
  - A wonder of wonders, 1661.
