= New Churchyard =

Cemetery in City of London

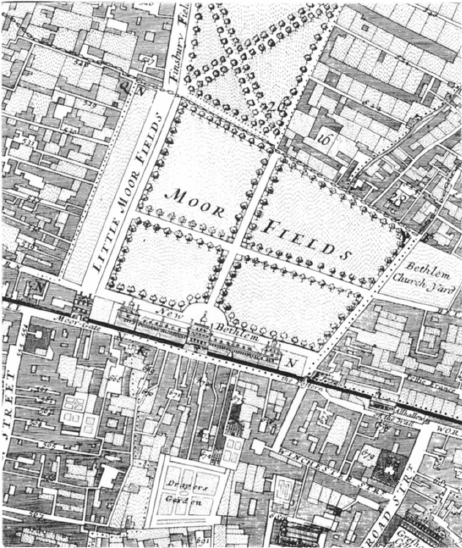
- Late seventeenth-century map showing "Bethlem Church Yard", to the east of new Bethlem Hospital, and "Moor Fields".
- Interactive map of New Churchyard

Details
- Established: July 1569
- Closed: March 1739
- Location: City of London
- Country: England
- Coordinates: 51°31′3.75″N 0°5′1.34″W
- Type: Municipal (closed)
- Owned by: City of London Corporation
- Size: 0.83 acre
- No. of graves: circa 25,000

The New Churchyard was a municipal and non-parochial burial ground in London. Established in 1569, it was used for burial from 1570 until 1739, by which date approximately 25,000 interments were estimated to have taken place. It was created to accommodate the ever-increasing number of new interments required as London's population expanded from the 16th to the 18th centuries. It was known as a "churchyard" despite not being associated with a church and, from the mid-17th century, became more commonly known as Bedlam or Bethlem burial ground because its location within the "Bedlam" or "Bethlem" area (land which previously formed the precinct of the Priory of St Mary of Bethlehem (later Bethlem Hospital)). The remains of the burial ground are now located under modern Liverpool Street, within the north-east corner of the City of London.

As a municipal ground, it was available to any institution, parish or individual who wished to use it. People from all walks of life were buried there but especially those at the margins of society. It was nondenominational, and in practice was particularly favoured by nonconformists. The ground was heavily used for the burial of the poor and those who died in some of London's hospitals and prisons, as well as plague victims.

In 1772, the burial ground was converted into private gardens and yards belonging to the adjoining houses, which had been built in 1737. However, burials were rediscovered during developments of the 19th and 20th centuries, chiefly during the creation of Liverpool Street (the road) in 1823–24 and the construction of Broad Street station in 1863–65. In 1985–87, and again in 2011–15, the site was the subject of major archaeological excavation and analysis in association with, respectively, the construction of the Broadgate development and the Crossrail railway project.

== Historical background ==
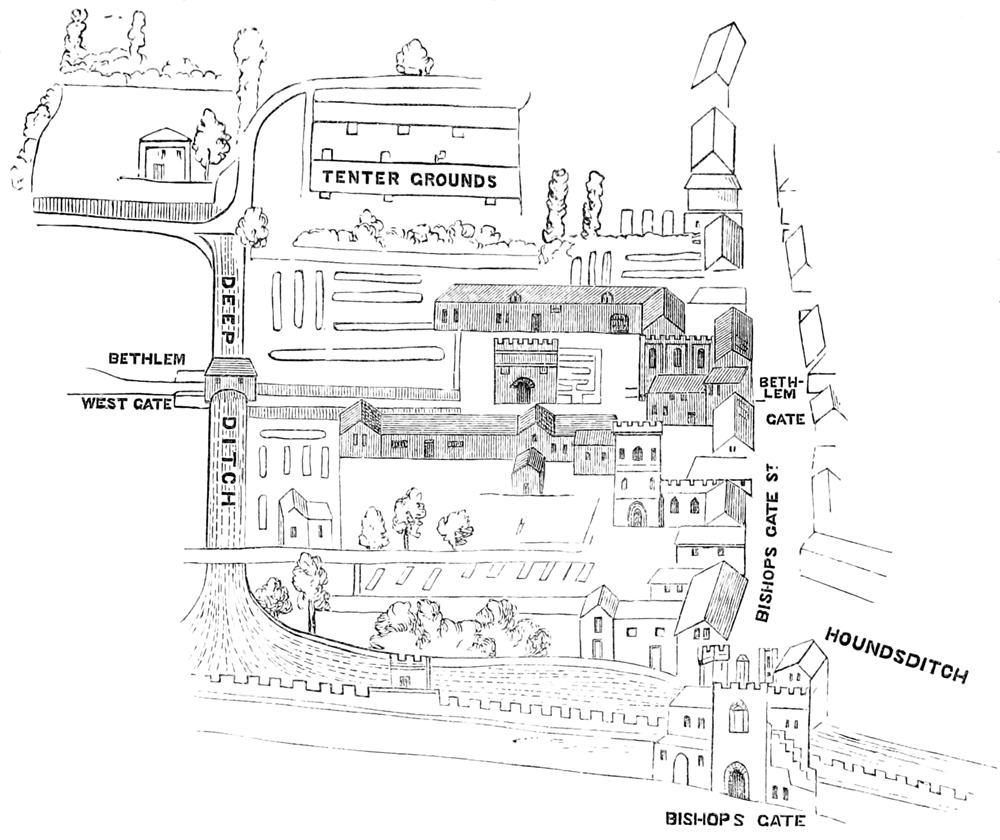
Plan of the first Bethlem Hospital and Moorfields, circa mid-16th century

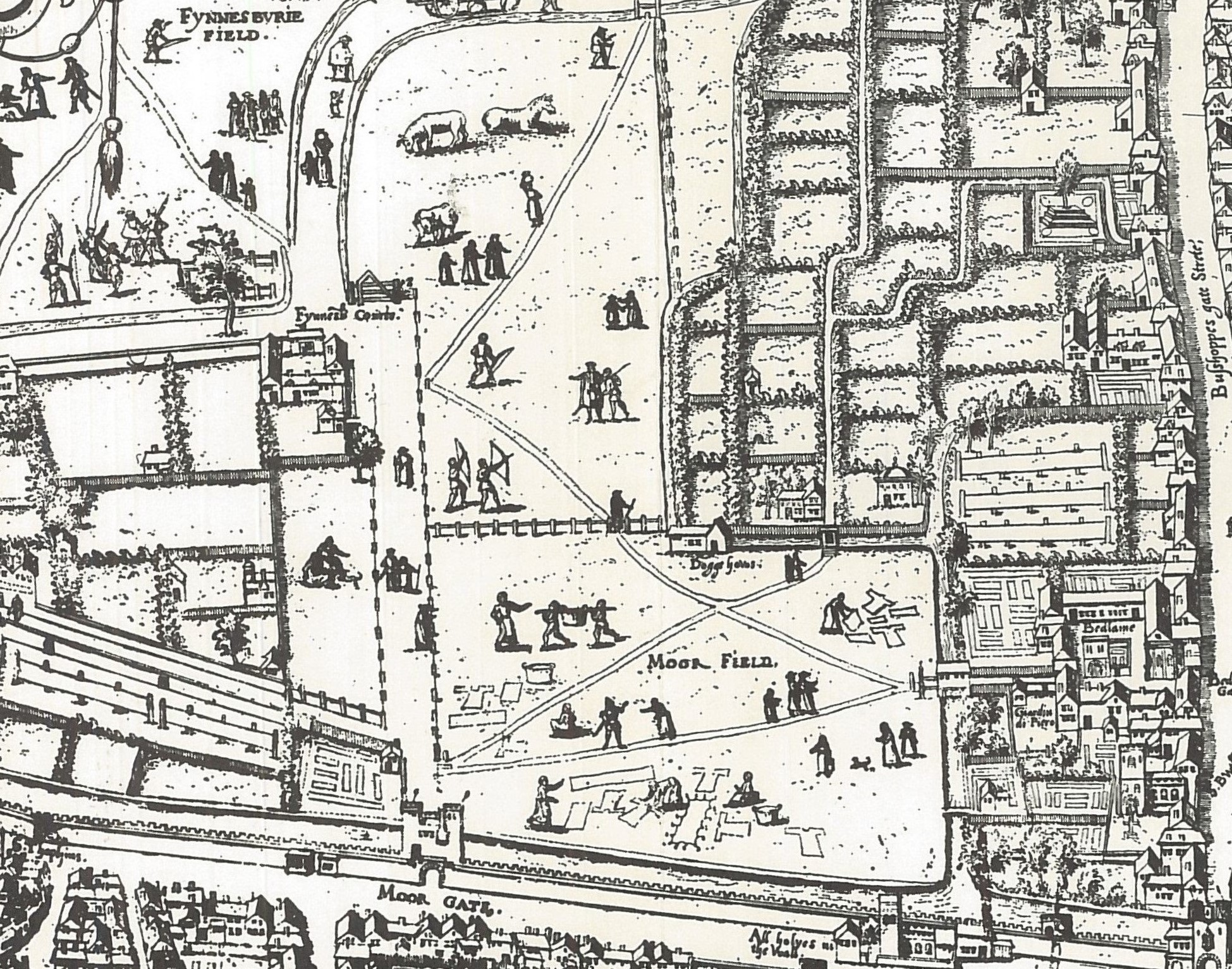
Moorgate and the Moorfields area shown on the "Copperplate" map of London of the 1550s

The burial ground was located in the parish of St Botolph without Bishopsgate and in Bishopsgate ward, just north of London's wall and where Broad Street station once stood, a site now located under the west half of modern Liverpool Street (the road), within the north-east corner of the modern City of London. Until 1569, the site of the New Churchyard was an undeveloped plot of land located on the eastern edge of Moorfields proper, or lower Moorfields, one of the last pieces of open land in the City of London, near Bishopsgate. The site was originally part of the lands of Bethlem Hospital and, by the 16th century, was being used as a garden. The plot became part of the lands of the City of London Corporation following the Dissolution in 1541, and was being leased as a tenterground immediately prior to its conversion into a burial ground in 1569.

== Opening as a burial ground ==
By the late 1560s the City of London Corporation recognised that London was in need of a municipal or "common" burial ground, particularly during times of epidemics and high mortality. In July 1569, the Lord Mayor Sir Thomas Rowe issued orders to convert the land for burials. A man called John Sherbrooke, from the parish of St Bartholomew-by-the-Exchange, was recorded as the first to be buried at the ground, sometime between 19 January and 19 February 1570 (new style). The ground was to be "free for the whole Citie to burye in without payinge anything"; the only permissible charge was for grave digging which was set at 6 pence per burial. A pulpit was built at the centre of the ground and an annual public Whit Sunday sermon was performed between 1570 and 1642, which the mayor and aldermen were expected to attend.

== Closure as a burial ground ==
In 1737, a new road of terraced houses called Broad Street Buildings was built adjoining the burial ground to the east and north. By this time the burial ground was densely filled, but burials continued despite the presence of properties overlooking the ground. The burial ground was closed by the Corporation following a petition from the residents of Broad Street Buildings, who complained of mass graves and "intolerable steams and vapours of a most noxious and pestilential quality". A decision to close the burial ground was reached on 1 March 1739 (new style): "...the said Burying Ground is now full of corps, and that it will be inconvenient, and dangerous to bury any more corps there till those that remain are sufficiently covered and decayed to prevent the noisome steam and stench which proceeds from such a multitude of dead corps being buryed, and not sufficiently covered, which if not prevented may be dangerous and infectious...". Although burials continued until its closure, the last named individual buried at the site was Mary Burt who died aged 105 on 9 April 1738.

== Disappearance ==
In 1762, the Corporation attempted to sell part of the burial ground for building, but the sale was cancelled following petitions from local residents, supported by the church of St Botolph without Bishopsgate. In 1772, the burial ground was converted into gardens and yards for the adjoining properties of Broad Street Buildings. All surface traces of the burial ground, including monuments and gravestones, were removed. Notable late-18th-century residents of Broad Street Buildings included Ephraim d'Aguilar, David Ricardo and Benjamin D'Israeli.

== Re-discovery ==
Parts of the burial ground were exposed during the successive developments in the 19th, 20th and 21st centuries. The Corporation authorised the creation of Liverpool Street in 1823. The constructions of the road (circa 1823–24) included a new sewer and a boundary wall, which unearthed the "mouldering bones of several hundred human bodies" that were first "scattered about in the most indecent manner" before being "partly re-interred in one pit … and partly carted away". A notable early resident of Liverpool Street was Charles Roach Smith, the English antiquarian and amateur archaeologist, who noted the accidental discovery of human remains at the site in the mid-19th century.

In 1863 Broad Street Buildings and its gardens were sold by the City to the North London Railway (NLR) Company. The construction of Broad Street station from 1863 to 1865 disinterred thousands of burials.

Despite further disturbance during the 19th and 20th centuries, the first archaeological investigation did not take place until the mid-1980s, prior to the construction of Broadgate, and was undertaken by the Department of Urban Archaeology (DUA). During the construction of Crossrail, more extensive archaeological excavation of the site was undertaken by Museum of London Archaeology (MOLA) between 2011 and 2015. Part of the dig was covered by Time Team (specials) episode 55, aired in December 2013.

== Findings ==
Around 400 skeletons were excavated during the DUA investigation of 1985–86 and were retained for study and analysis. Only a short summary of this work was published.

MOLA's 2011–2015 excavations were the largest archaeological study of London's population from the 16th to the 18th centuries. Detailed osteological analysis was undertaken on one quarter of the 3354 burials excavated, and revealed evidence of where these individuals came from, what jobs they had, what they ate, what illnesses they suffered and what medicines they took. Other finds included grave goods, gravestones, tombs and coffins, as well as evidence on the layout and operation of the burial ground. The site also revealed rare archaeological evidence of early preventative measures taken to thwart bodysnatchers, as well as mass burial of early 17th century plague victims.

The excavations of 2011–2015 have been documented via Crossrail's Learning Legacy website, and the Archaeology Data Service (ADS) website. The results have also been made publicly available via publication, television documentaries and museum exhibition. The publication of the 2011–2015 excavations incorporated the findings and analysis of the 1985–86 excavation.

== Notable graves ==
Notable burials include:

- Steven Bachiler (buried October 31, 1656), an English clergyman who was an early proponent of the separation of church and state in America.
- John Biddle (or Bidle; 1615–1662), an influential English nontrinitarian, and Unitarian, often called "the Father of English Unitarianism".
- Nicholas Culpeper (1616–1654), an English botanist, herbalist, physician, and astrologer.
- William Erbery (or Erbury; 1604–1654), a Welsh clergyman and radical Independent theologian.
- Robert Greene (1558–1592), an English author and dramatist.
- Henry Jessey (1603–1663), dissenting minister and scholar, founding member of the "Jacobites" (Puritan religious sect).
- John Lambe (or Lamb; circa 1545–1628), an English astrologer.
- John Lilburne (1614–1657), also known as Freeborn John, an English political Leveller.
- Robert Lockyer (or Lockier; 1625–1649), an English soldier in Oliver Cromwell's New Model Army and a Leveller.
- Lodowicke Muggleton (1609–1698), an English religious thinker, who gave his name to Muggletonianism.
- Ann Overton (née Gardiner; circa 1613–1665), wife of Major-General Robert Overton (circa 1609–1678), who was a prominent English soldier and scholar.
- John Reeve (1608–1658), English plebeian prophet.
- Dame Mary Rowe (died 1583), the wife of Sir Thomas Rowe, Lord Mayor of London 1568–1569.
- William Walwyn (1600–1681), an English pamphleteer, Leveller and medical practitioner.
- Sarah Williams (formerly Jenkes, née Walwyn; 1648–1708), the daughter of William Walwyn (1600–1681) and wife of John Williams (1636–1709), Bishop of Chichester.

== Records ==
A series of "keepers", who were appointed by the Court of Aldermen, were responsible for management of the burial ground. This position and its duties were similar to that of a sexton. As a municipal non-parochial ground the management of the New Churchyard was overseen by the City, therefore, some administrative information survives in the records of the Corporation, principally the surviving Court of Aldermen repertories, City account books and journals of the City Lands Committee, which are all held at the London Metropolitan Archive. Unfortunately, there is no surviving burial register for the ground. Indeed, the ground may never have had its own burial register because registration for those buried at the New Churchyard occurred at the parish where the deceased had been resident and/or had died. As part of the 2011–2015 investigations, Crossrail undertook a volunteer project which aimed to compile an online searchable database of many of those who were buried at the site.

== Bibliography ==
- Harding, Vanessa (2007). The Dead and the Living in Paris and London, 1500–1670. Cambridge: Cambridge University Press. ISBN 978-0521009744.
- Hartle, Robert (18 January 2016). "Mary Godfree: the untold story of a Londoner and plague victim". MOLA.
- Hartle, Robert (2017). The New Churchyard: from Moorfields marsh to Bethlem burial ground, Brokers Row and Liverpool Street. London: Crossrail. ISBN 978-1907586439.
- Hartle, Robert (2024). "The Corporation of Corpse-stealers' Archaeological and historical evidence of bodysnatching in early eighteenth-century London". In Craig-Atkins, Elizabeth; Harvey, Karen (eds.). The Material Body: Embodiment, history and archaeology in industrialising England, 1700-1850. Manchester: Manchester University Press. pp. 100–132. ISBN 978-1526152787.
- Holmes, Mrs Basil [Isabella M.] (1896). The London Burial Grounds: notes on their history from the earliest times to the present day. London: T.F. Unwin.
- Hunting, Penelope (1991). Broadgate and Liverpool Street Station. London: Rosehaugh Stanhope Developments. ISBN 978-1873175026.
- Gander, Kashmira (10 March 2015). "Bedlam burial ground: Archaeologists excavating 3,000 skeletons from under London's Liverpool Street station". The Independent.
- Tuke, D (1882). Chapters in the History of the Insane in the British Isles. London: Kegan Paul, Trench & Co.
- Wood, Anthony (1691). Athenae Oxoniense, Vol.2. London.
