= Jacob Bauthumley =

English radical religious writer

Jacob Bauthumley or Bottomley (1613–1692) was an English radical religious writer, usually identified as a central figure among the Ranters. He served as part of the New Model Army, leaving in March 1650. After the Restoration of 1660, he took up a job as a librarian in Leicester, where he produced a book of extracts from John Foxe, published in 1676.

== Biography ==
Bauthumley is known principally for The Light and Dark Sides of God (1650). This work was regarded as blasphemous for its pantheistic tendencies, including the following:

Nay, I see that God is in all Creatures, Man and Beast, Fish and Fowle, and every green thing, from the highest Cedar to the Ivey on the wall; and that God is the life and being of them all, and that God doth really dwell, and if you will personally; ... and hath his Being no where else out of the Creatures.

After the Blasphemy Act of August 1650, he was arrested, convicted, and burned through the tongue.

Bauthumley had served in the Parliamentarian Army; Norman Cohn states that he was in the Army while writing the pamphlet, and took part in Ranter and Quaker meetings in Leicestershire in the mid-1650s. Christopher Hill says that he left the Army in March 1650. His family had earlier suffered ostracism, for permitting sermons by Jeremiah Burroughes to be said in their house; he was a shoemaker.

After the Restoration of 1660 he was a librarian in Leicester. He produced a book of extracts from John Foxe, published in 1676.

== Views ==
Bauthumley denied that the Bible was the Word of God, and that Christ was more divine than other men. He considered that the real Devil lay in human nature, while God dwells in the flesh of man.

Historian E. P. Thompson calls his views 'quasi-pantheistic' in their re-definition of God and Christ, and quotes A. L. Morton to the effect that this is the central Ranter doctrine.

== Selected publications ==
- The Light and Dark Sides of God, Or, A Plain and Brief Discourse of the Light Side (1650)
