= Theaurau John Tany =

English preacher and religious leader

Theaurau John Tany (baptised Thomas Totney; 21 January 1608 - 1659) was an English preacher and religious visionary.

== Early activities ==
Totney was born at South Hykeham, near Lincoln, the third, but eldest surviving, son of John Totney and Anne, née Snelle. His father, although a poor farmer and never of the parish elite, was a respectable member of the local community. Nothing is known of Thomas's education.

=== Goldsmithery ===
In April 1626, Totney was bound as an apprentice in London to a fishmonger but was not taught his trade, instead receiving instruction in his master's adopted profession of goldsmith. On receiving his freedom, he married a daughter of Richard Kett, a prosperous Norfolk landowner, whose great-uncle had been executed as leader of the 1549 East Anglian rebellion. Her uncle Francis Kett was an Anglican clergyman burned for heresy in 1589.

Rather than serving as a journeyman, Totney established himself as a householder, possibly using his wife's dowry. He set up his own shop in St Katherine Cree, a location favoured by small retailers for its inexpensive rents. To ensure that Totney's business activities fell within their orbit, he was translated to the Goldsmiths Company in January 1634. However, along with the majority of ‘remote’ goldsmiths, he resisted a Company initiative (which had gained royal approval) to vacate his dwelling and relocate in Cheapside, the hub of the goldsmiths’ trade.

=== Early political and religious involvement ===
Totney remained in St Katherine Cree for another six years. There he heard the fiery sermons of Stephen Denison on the immutability of God's decrees of predestination. It was a doctrine that troubled Totney until his epiphany. When his first son was born in December 1634, Totney refused to have him baptised and was presented before an ecclesiastical court as a result. Following his wife's death, he married Alice Burton by licence during Lent; they had five children. This was the first day of the New Year in the old calendar and his actions hint at a type of confrontational godliness and perhaps also zealous Sabbatarianism.

Totney inherited from his brother a farm in Little Shelford, Cambridgeshire, and, in spring 1640, Thomas and Alice moved to live there. In the summer of 1640, probably while serving as a parish constable, he played a part in resisting the collection of ship money. By his own account he was imprisoned in London and his horse distrained on the county sheriff's authority. A series of payments in 1642 show his support for those opposed to Charles I. He claimed to have witnessed one of Captain Oliver Cromwell’s orations delivered at Huntingdon to newly mustered volunteers. Totney later possessed a great saddle, musket, pair of pistols and sword, suggesting he served as a harquebusier. By December 1644, he had returned to Little Shelford where he resumed his duties as a local tax official, as well as taking up sequestered land and providing quarter for Parliamentarian soldiers and their horses. Following the outbreak of a second Civil War, Totney rented out his lands and moved with his family to St Clement Danes, Westminster; Alice died shortly after the move and she and was buried in the parish.

The following year, he began a period of fasting and purification, which led to a divine experience which changed his life.

== Revelation and preaching ==
=== New identity ===
After his revelation, Thomas Totney assumed the prophetic name TheaurauJohn Tany. 'TheaurauJohn' he understood to mean ‘God his declarer of the morning, the peaceful tidings of good things’. While his former surname may have been vocalised as Tawtney, his new last name was usually pronounced Tawney. Because he had a speech impediment he may have dropped the consonant. In addition, he appropriated a coat of arms; "azure, three bars argent surmounted by the crest a hind's head erased, gules, ducally gorged, or". This device, based on that of the de Tany family, appears on several of his works. Furthermore, he declared himself ‘a Jew of the Tribe of Reuben’ and took the titles High Priest and Recorder to the thirteen Tribes of the Jews. Tany justified his claims by inventing a fantastic genealogy that traced his descent from Aaron, brother of Moses, through the tribe of Judah and by way of the ten tribes of Israel, the Tartars and the Welsh. He also circumcised himself.

Thereafter, believing he had been given the gift of tongues with which to preach the everlasting gospel of God's light and love to all nations, he went forth armed with sword and word. Crying vengeance in the streets of London, he declared woe and destruction upon the city, prophesying that the ‘Earth shall burn as an Oven’ and all the proud, the wicked and the ‘ungodly shall be as stubble to this flame’. Drawing on the potent image of Christ as goldsmith, purging dross and corruption in a furnace, Tany forged his prophetic identity – the messenger foretold by Malachi. He claimed his authority rested with the one who sent him, God:

but who may abide the day of his appearing? for he is like fullers sope, a refiners fire.

=== Jewish millenarianism ===
Insisting that the restitution of the Jews was at hand and that he had been sent forth to gather them and proclaim ‘Israels return’, Tany set about enacting a millenarian mission to restore the Jews to their own land. In the manner of the children of Israel before him, he began living in a tent, perhaps modelled upon the tabernacle, which he decorated with a symbol representing the tribe of Judah. He preached in the parks and fields around London and gathered a handful of followers. His message was strong, denouncing the clergy as ‘diabolical dumb dogs, Tythe-mongers’, who fleece rather than succour the people. Gospel injunctions also made him demand justice:

feed the hungry, clothe the naked, oppress none, set free them bounden, if this be not, all your Religion is a lye, a vanity, a cheat, deceived and deceiving.

Tany's first publication was a broadside entitled I Proclaime From the Lord of Hosts The returne of the Jewes From their Captivity (25 April 1650). It is likely that Robert Norwood, a wealthy London merchant, paid for its printing.

=== Apocalyptic writings and preaching ===
In early September 1650, Tany was at Bradfield, Berkshire at the same time as William Everard, one-time leader of the Diggers. There was bedlam. It was reported that the rector, John Pordage, fell into a trance while preaching and bellowing like a bull, ran to his house. There he found his wife upstairs, clothed all in white from head to toe, holding a white rod in her hand. Moreover, an adolescent was said to have fallen into a very strange fit, foaming at the mouth for two hours. He dictated verses concerning the destruction of London and demanded to go there to meet a goldsmith.

Tany next published two tracts: Whereas TheaurauJohn Taiiiiijour My servant (15 November 1650) and THE NATIONS RIGHT in Magna Charta (28 December 1650). Both demonstrated his earnest desire for social reformation, the latter exhorting the common soldiers to dissolve Parliament and call fresh elections. His next offering, Aurora in Tranlagorum in Salem Gloria, seems to have been written on three consecutive days in late December 1650. It was printed by a Baptist who had previously printed a ‘very dangerous’ book. The publisher was Thomas Totney's brother-in-law. It was sold by Giles Calvert from his shop at ‘The Black-spread-Eagle’ at the west end of St Paul's Cathedral. In January 1651, Tany wrote the first of the epistles that eventually comprised THEOUS ORI APOKOLIPIKAL (1651) and Second Part OF HIS Theous-Ori APOKOLIPIKAL (1653).

== Blasphemy charges and trial ==
=== Excommunication and imprisonment ===
On 6 March 1651, Tany was apparently brought before the Westminster Assembly of Divines, responding to their questions with thirty-seven of his own queries. Nonetheless, they accounted him mad. Perhaps shortly thereafter he forsook his trade.

On 25 March, Tany preached at Eltham, Kent and then again on 13 April at Norwood's house in St Mary Aldermary. In May, Norwood was excommunicated from his gathered church. The following month an indictment was prepared jointly against Norwood and Tany. The indicters seem to have understood Tany as some type of Ranter, as one of ungodly conduct who allegorised the Bible and internalised hell; as an antiscripturian universalist who repudiated gospel ordinances and averred that men might live as they wished; as one who glorified sin and maintained that the soul is God. Yet, as Norwood recognised, only two of the charges fell within the scope of the Blasphemy Act of August 1650 – the allegations that Tany and Norwood affirmed:

the Soul is of the essence of God

There is neither hell nor damnation.

As their own accounts of the trial's proceedings make clear, the defendants adamantly maintained that their words had been misrepresented, altered and taken out of context. Even so, on 13 August 1651, they were convicted jointly of blasphemy by a jury of twelve men at the London sessions of the peace held in the Old Bailey. They were each sentenced to six months imprisonment in Newgate gaol without bail or mainprise.

=== Appeals ===
On 27 October 1651, legal proceedings were initiated in the Court of Upper Bench appealing the verdict. After several sessions the case was deferred until the next law term. More hearings followed. On 4 February 1652, Tany appeared before the Court. A London tailor named John Reeve claimed that the same morning God revealed to him that he had been chosen as the Lord's ‘last messenger’. Reeve and his cousin Lodowick Muggleton, a freeman of the Merchant Taylors’ Company, announced themselves to be ‘the two Witnesses of the Spirit’ foretold in the Revelation of Saint John. In addition, they denounced Tany as a ‘counterfeit high Priest’ and pretended prophet, marking him as a Ranter, the spawn of Cain. A few days later, the judges of the Upper Bench made their judgement: Lord Chief Justice Rolle washed his hands of the business. On 16 February 1652, Tany and Norwood, having served their sentence, were each released on £100 bail pending good behaviour for one year. Thomas Totney's former master and another man, later described as a goldsmith, provided sureties. In Easter term Norwood initiated a new legal appeal. After several hearings the judges deferred proceedings until the following law term. On 28 June 1652, they reversed the guilty judgement against Norwood and Tany, resolving that their opinions had been made to rigidly conform to the strictures of the Blasphemy Act. For, whereas the Act made it unlawful to maintain that ‘there is neither Heaven nor Hell, neither Salvation nor Damnation’, the defendants who affirmed that:

there is ‘no Hell nor Damnation’, are not within the Statute, for tho by Implication if there be no Hell there is no Heaven, yet the court is not to Expand these words by Implication but according to the Letters of the Stat[ute].

=== Resumption of activities and second name change ===
Within a month of his release, Tany published a pamphlet he had written in Newgate entitled High Priest to the IEVVES, HIS Disputive challenge to the Universities of Oxford and Cambridge and the whole Hirach. of Roms Clargical Priests (March 1652). Echoing Paul's Epistle to the Romans, Tany proclaimed the return of ‘Israels Seed’ from captivity. About 1 January 1653, it appears from his own account that Tany underwent another purificatory ritual. He refrained from speaking for thirty-four days, isolating himself for twenty-one of them. On the fourteenth day he transcribed an edict to ‘all the Jewes the whole earth over’, which was to be engraved in brass and sent to the synagogue in Amsterdam. He signed this proclamation "Theauroam Tannijahhh, King of the seven Nations, and Captain General under my Master Jehovah, and High-Priest and Leader of the Peoples unto HIERUSALEM". Together with some other material, it was issued by an unknown publisher under the title HIGH NEWS FOR HIERUSALEM (no date). It exasperated one reader, who complained ‘truly I skill not the man, nor his spirit; in his writing he offends against all rules of Grammar, Geography, Genealogy, History, Chronology, Theology & c, so far as I understand them’.

In March 1654 a list of some thirty ‘Grand Blasphemers and Blasphemies’ was submitted to the Committee for Religion, which included:

XIX. A Goldsmith that did live in the Strand, and after in the City, and then at Eltham; who called his name Theaurau John Tany, the High Priest, & c. Published in Print, That all Religion is a lie, a deceit, and a cheat.

== Climax of claims ==
=== Claims of divine power ===
Writing from ‘the Tent of Judah’ on the ‘Tenth DAY NISAN’ (probably 16 April 1654), Tany addressed a millenarian epistle ‘Unto his Brethren the QUAKERS scornfully so called, who ARE the Children of Abraham, Isaac, and Jacob; who ARE circumcised in Heart’. He saluted them as descendants of the Jewish race, an elect remnant who spoke a pure language and trembled at the word of God. On 8 May 1654, he issued an edict to all ‘earthen men and women’ announcing that he would shortly proclaim the Law and Gospel from his tent standing in the bounds of the Middle Park at Eltham, Kent. On 8 June 1654, he read out a speech in which he laid claim to the crowns of France, Rome, Naples, Sicily and Jerusalem, as well as reaffirming an earlier claim to the crown of England. He did this by repeating Pontius Pilate’s reply to the chief priests of the Jews after Pilate had written ‘JESUS OF NAZARETH THE KING OF THE JEWS’ as the title to be put on Christ's cross:

What I have written, I have written.

=== Assault on Parliament ===
On the morning of Saturday, 30 December 1654, in the week that Cromwell was offered the crown, Tany made a large fire at Lambeth into which he cast his great saddle, sword, musket, pistols, books and bible. He crossed the River Thames in a rowing boat and made his way to Parliament, ascending the stairs into the lobby outside the door. Unable to deliver a petition he departed, returning after about an hour oddly attired with a long, rusty sword by his side. Pacing up and down the lobby he threw off his cloak and began slashing wildly, but was disarmed before anyone was hurt. He was brought to the bar of the House and questioned by the Speaker. He refused to remove his hat, was evidently mistaken for a Quaker and committed to the Gatehouse prison. Having been examined by the Committee for regulating printing, he wrote to the Speaker requesting liberty to have an audience with Cromwell. He then attached a great lock and long chain to his leg as a symbol of ‘the people of Englands Captivity’. Legal proceedings were transferred to the Court of Upper Bench, but on 10 February 1655 he was bailed upon habeas corpus.

Two days later a fire broke out in Fleet Street. In the following months, London was engulfed by several more unexplained fires which were interpreted as a sign of the impending destruction of the world. Eventually an arsonist was apprehended who may have been in the pay of William Finch, one of Tany's disciples.

=== Final years ===
In September 1655, after weeks of heavy rain and widespread floods, Tany ‘in one of his old whimsies’ pitched his tent in the large tract of open ground between Lambeth Marsh and Southwark known as St George's Fields. A satirical newsbook writer thought him ‘a madman’, fitter ‘for Bedlam then a Tent’. Sometime after 16 June 1656, Tany set sail. He crossed the English Channel and at an unknown date arrived in the United Provinces, perhaps to gather the Jews of Amsterdam. Some three years later, now calling himself Ram Johoram, he was reported lost, drowned after taking passage in a ship from Brill bound for London. He was survived by his eldest daughter and probably also a second daughter and second son.

== Evaluation ==
Tany's writings embrace currents of magic and mysticism, alchemy and astrology, numerology and angelology, Neoplatonism and gnosticism, hermeticism and Christian Cabbala. His sources were varied, although they seem to have included almanacs, popular prophecies, and legal treatises, as well as The Testament of the Twelve Patriarches, the Sonnes of Jacob (1647), Jacob Boehme's A Description of the Three Principles of the Divine Essence (English translation, 1648) and Mercurius Teutonicus (1649), Theologica Germanica, or, Mysticall Divinitie (1648), Paracelsus of the Nature of Things (1650), Henry Cornelius Agrippa's Three Books of Occult Philosophy (1650), and Menasseh ben Israel's The Hope of Israel (1650). Tany had a few loyal followers but he failed to found a sect.
