= John Reeve (religious leader) =

John Reeve (1608–1658) was an English plebeian prophet who believed the voice of God had instructed him to found a Third Commission in preparation for the last days of earth. This commission was third in succession to the Mosaic Law and the gospel of Jesus.

He and his followers came to be known as Muggletonians, named after his cousin Lodowicke Muggleton. The pair saw themselves as the last prophets and the Two Witnesses foretold in the Revelation 11:3. They are sometimes called “ the Staffordshire prophets”.

== Early life ==
Reeve was born in Wiltshire. His father, Walter, was styled a gentleman but who fell on hard times. As a result, John and his elder brother, William, were apprenticed tailors in the City of London. William was Lodowicke Muggleton's first employer as a journeyman tailor. Mercurius Politicus (1653) says of John Reeve and Lodowicke Muggleton "only one works and that is Muggleton; the other (they say) writes Prophecies."

== "A Transcendent Spiritual Treatise" ==
A Transcendent Spiritual Treatise was the first Muggletonian book. It is written in the first person singular by Reeve but appears under the names of both Reeve and Muggleton as "the last true witnesses". The book was printed in 1652 with a second, slightly different, print-run the following year. It could not be openly published since it could not be licensed. It purports to be a message from Christ Jesus to the elect by way of his last prophet and is a forerunner to God's reappearance in the skies above earth on the Day of Judgment. It announces Reeve and Lodowicke Muggleton to be the last two witnesses "and suddenly after we have delivered this dreadful message, this God the man Jesus, will visibly appear to bear witness whether he sent us or not." The job of the two witnesses is to declare the mind of God. They are given a power to expound scripture beyond anything that has gone before. Anyone rejecting their commission commits the unforgivable sin against the Holy Ghost. The witnesses shall pronounce such a person cursed by God. The book then proceeds to a number of specific themes.

- The Commission came in the early hours of 3, 4 and 5 February 1651 (Old Style) "by voice of words" from Christ Jesus. On the first morning, Reeve was told
  - "I have given thee understanding of my mind in the Scriptures above all men in the world"
  - "look into thy own body, there thou shalt see the Kingdom of Heaven and the Kingdom of Hell"
  - "I have chosen thee my last messenger for a great work unto this bloody unbelieving world. And I have given thee Lodowicke Muggleton to be thy mouth"
  - "I have put the two-edged sword of my spirit into thy mouth, that whoever I pronounce blessed through thy mouth, is blessed to eternity; and whoever I pronounce cursed through thy mouth, is cursed to eternity" On the second morning, he was told to go curse Thomas Tany. On the third morning, he was told to curse John Robins.
- The Antichrist was identified as John Robins because he exalted himself in God's place.
- Christ requires that men do not take up arms even though this had been lawful in the days of Moses. All vengeance is the Lord's and is reserved for Judgment Day when the bodies of the reprobate shall become their own hells. Then shall all natural light be snuffed out, to be replaced by the return of chaos just as, in the beginning, earth and water had existed as uncreated substances. The act of creation consisted of God giving form and life to the elements through his word and his breath. Humans differ from their Creator and they know this because they see the elect and the damned and understand that all this can only have come about as a result of God's sovereign power.
- God is a spiritual person in the form of a man. The angels are spiritual beings given over to spiritual (and not carnal) desires. God is the object of the angels' desires and it was the deliberate withdrawal of divine satisfactions from the reprobate angel which caused him to fall back on his own resources and pride. No human has experience of such things as these. People can only penetrate the mysteries by the exercise of faith. God's kingdom will not come on this earth but will arise after the elevation of the elect to heaven in their new spiritual embodiment at the Day of Judgment: "Behold, I create all things new."
- The reprobate angel was created by God's will "to bring forth his seed, or generation of wise, and prudent, subtle serpent-men and women to oppose the Creator and his innocent seed." "Woe be to the inhabitants of the earth for the devil is come down amongst you." Evil came to the earth because the serpent seduced Eve. Cain was born to perpetuate the devil's frustrated rage on this earth. Thus, there is no devil but that which dwells within the bodies of men and women.
- There are signs that this process of evil is being reversed such as Christ's coming as the second Adam and by the restoration of purity to his mother. "Eternity becomes time and time becomes eternity again." It is this process that comes to fulfillment in the "woman clothed with the sun and with the moon under her feet" in Revelation 12:1.
- "that the body or person of that Elijah was taken up and glorified in the Heavens by the Creator for that very purpose that he might represent the power of God the Father for that time or season" when God was on earth. Because God shared an authentic mortal death, the elect are redeemed from their debt of sin. The meaningful trinity is not the one taught by the established churches but the one of water, blood and spirit which symbolises the three commissions. The established churches have no commission and continue to teach discredited laws. Inevitably, the outcome of their trinity is strife and confusion.
- Body and soul are both mortal. Not until the Day of Judgment will the elect quicken to a glorious resurrection.
- The civil authorities are due obedience in all matters other than matters of conscience.

== Establishing the Third Commission ==
Reeve embarked upon his career as God's chosen prophet by issuing, in 1653, an eight-page pamphlet entitled A General Epistle from the Holy Spirit unto all prophets, ministers and speakers in the world. Reeve pronounced sentence of eternal damnation on two classes of people: those who heard of his commission but despised it, and those who continued to preach the message of the existing churches. Reeve says such ministers are not sent by God. They possess no commission and their opinions are merely their own. "You preach to the people out of the bottomless pit of your own lying imagination, which is the Devil." And perhaps more tellingly, "You know not the Lord Jesus who requires mercy and not sacrifice, who causeth the sun to shine upon the just and unjust."

Reeve was beginning to tread on very dangerous ground. In 1656, James Nayler, a Quaker, was to be convicted of blasphemy after a trial before parliament. "After a debate which reveals the savagery of frightened men, Nayler was sentenced to be flogged, pilloried, branded, his tongue to be bored and then to be imprisoned indefinitely. This was milder punishment than many MPs wanted." Earlier, in 1653, Reeve's General Epistle was rapidly making enemies amongst those who supported Oliver Cromwell's policy of religious toleration as well as those bitterly opposed to it – and for the same reason in both cases. What was the point, the argument ran, of granting toleration to minorities if they then used it as licence to vilify everyone else? Reeve was clearly impelled by a Godly imperative rather than political tact.

Reeve and Muggleton were arrested under the Blasphemy Act 1650, the Transcendent Spiritual Treatise providing the evidence. Reeve was examined by the Lord Mayor of London, John Fowke, on three heads; self-deification, cursing Oliver Cromwell and denying the Trinity. Reeve denied all charges. "We own the Trinity more than any Men, both Father, Son and Spirit, are all one Person and one God Christ Jesus." A further charge brought by ministers outraged by the General Epistle was dropped, possibly because of the difficulty of framing a case, or possibly because the minister in attendance was from outside the jurisdiction.

Reeve and Muggleton were remanded to Newgate prison to be tried by jury on 17 October 1653. They were convicted on a single count of denying the Trinity and sentenced to six months in Old Bridewell house of correction. During this period, Reeve's A Remonstrance from the Eternal God (effectively his appeal to Cromwell) was printed and published by Jeremiah Mount and well received. The pair were released in April 1654 to find they had a following. As a result, a number of important letters were written by Reeve during 1654, principally to Rev. William Sedgwick, an Anglican minister in Ely, to the Earl of Pembroke and to Isaac Pennington the younger. On the face of it, Reeve's letter to these important persons were filled with failure. All three correspondents eventually preferred the Quaker viewpoint. Reading the letters one gets the impression Reeve doesn't much care. He's found the keystone belief for which he has long searched; universal mortality. People die, their souls die with them, the whole universe will soon expire and God has already died. Professor William M. Lamont remarks that most of Reeve's contemporaries would have found this last item disturbingly blasphemous. It was to provide the subject matter for Reeve's final book, Joyfull News from Heaven, or the Souls Mortality Proved.

Reeve's health never recovered from his prison experiences. From this time, his wife and daughter provided the family livelihood. But his wife died, probably on 29 March 1656. After this, Reeve was a pauper. But he had one great book left in him A Divine Looking-Glass (1656). At the opening of this book it says that all writings come "of divine inspiration or human imagination" So confident was Reeve that only the Commission of the Last Witnesses was of divine origin that he said in a letter of 15 August 1656 to Alice Webb "if the Lord Jesus does not bear witness unto our testimony and make it evident that he has sent us in a few months then you may conclude that there was never any true prophets .. "

Reeve did not see himself as founding a faith so much as announcing imminent events to take place in the skies above London. The record of his prophetic experiences, as given in Lodowicke Muggleton's Acts of the Witnesses, is not naive reportage. Some of its embedded expectations are quite explicit, such as harking back to the Book of Revelation or to the clear parallels with Moses' taking on the first commission. Other references are meant to be felt more obliquely. We are told of Reeve's reluctance to assume his task, implying the matter derived from the will of God, not the pushiness of the prophet. We are told of Reeve's earlier experiences which he had interpreted as being for his personal benefit alone, thus implying he is an old hand who can be relied upon to evaluate such things correctly. The story is framed by the expectations of the times.

Reeve died in July 1658 and was buried in the now-removed Bethlehem Burial Ground (the New Churchyard).

== Reevonians ==
After Reeve's death, Lodowicke Muggleton became the leader of the group as the sole surviving prophet. It is generally agreed that Muggleton introduced one novelty into a faith largely of Reeve's devising. This was the principle that God took no notice of everyday doings in human affairs. Not everyone was happy to accept this innovation. Some people didn't like it because it denied any personal relationship between believer and God. Others didn't like the way it left the prophet all-powerful with no possible appeal against his decisions. As a result, at all times in the faith's history, there have been those who felt they have more in common with Reeve and less in common with Lodowicke Muggleton. So, are there Reevonians?

The relationship between Reeve and Lodowicke Muggleton has been subject to considerable speculation from historians. William Lamont has argued that Muggleton had been the first to experience divine revelations and that Reeve was envious. Christopher Hill, on the other hand, has argued that Muggleton recast the events of 1651–52 after Reeve's death to put himself in a better light. Alexander Gordon may have got nearer the mark with the simplest possible explanation. It was all down to differences of personality. Reeve was a somewhat hot-headed ideologue whereas Muggleton was content with the virtues of a quiet, still people. It might also be a matter of timing. Reeve lived six years in the faith; Muggleton 46 years. The faith had certainly started with the most urgent tidings of apocalypse. As time ticked by and the world remained stubbornly unchanging, something we might call "St Paul's syndrome" may have set in; making it necessary to accommodate this lengthening perspective. Had Reeve lived, he too would have faced the same adjustments, although that is not to say he would have chosen the same solution.

In Reeve's last writings and letters he no longer mentions his fellow witness and his whole tone is of a man who feels himself alone and abandoned. Muggleton's own record of Reeve's death is respectful but detached. It is perhaps significant that whilst Muggleton took steps to look after those who had helped Reeve in his last years there is no suggestion there had been help to Reeve himself.

== Sources ==
Modern knowledge of Reeve derives from three sources. Firstly and predominantly, from Muggleton's autobiographical testament "Acts of the Witnesses" although this was written long after Reeve's death. Secondly, Reeve's own letters and pamphlets in so far as copies survive in the Muggletonian archive. However, Alexander Delamaine's Great Book was not begun until 1682. The tone of these writings is often slanted by Reeve's urgent need for patronage and funds. Lastly, from contemporary commentators, although these may only be retelling gossip and hearsay. Unlike Muggleton, there is no pictorial likeness but Muggleton reports, "He had a fine head of hair, it was black, waving over his shoulders."

By no means all of Reeve's writings survive. Thomas Tomkinson quotes passages from Reeve which can no longer be traced.
