= Seekers =

17th century English Protestant dissenters

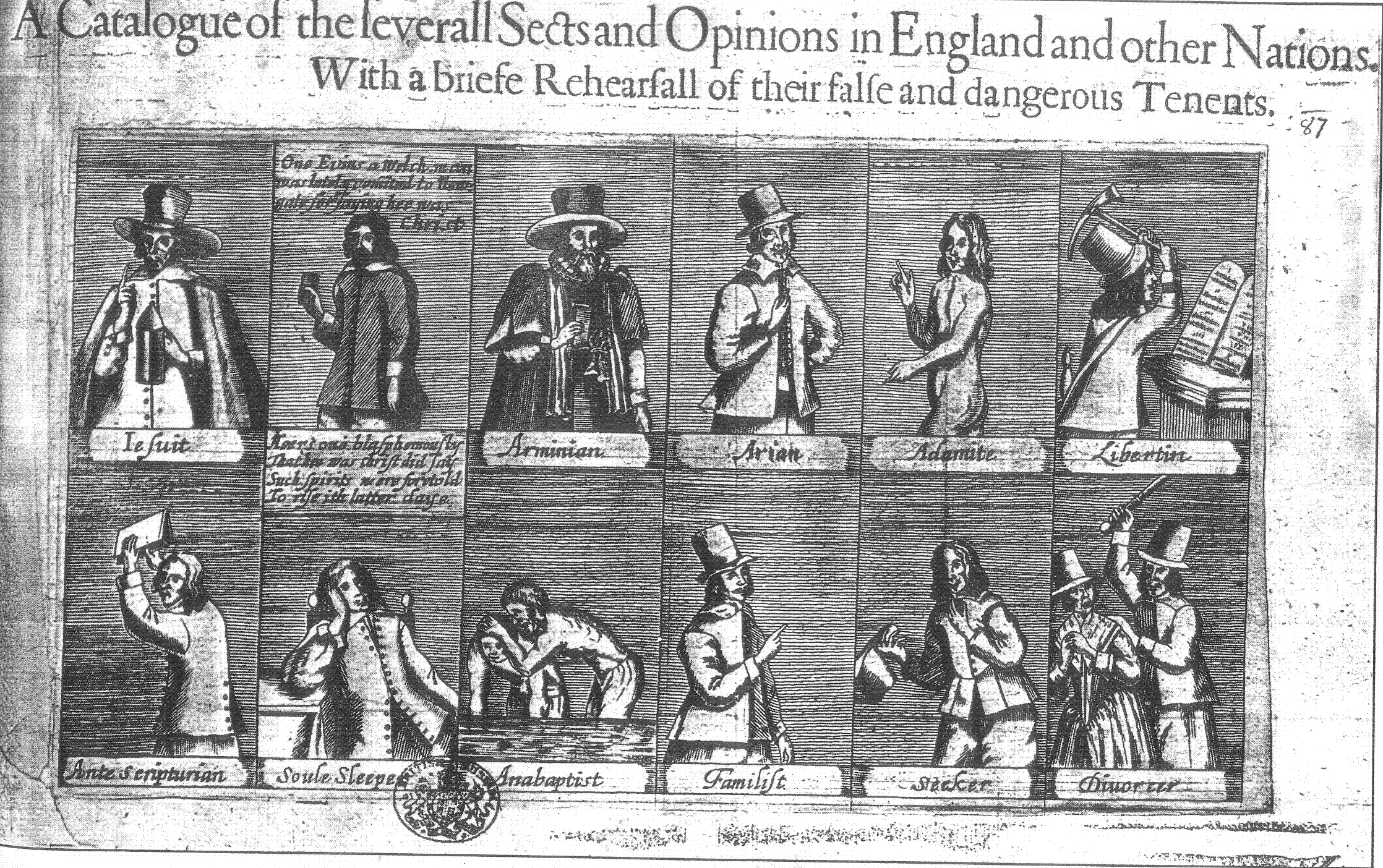
A broadsheet "Catalogue of the several Sects and Opinions", 1647

The Seekers, or Legatine-Arians as they were sometimes known, were an English dissenting group that emerged around the 1620s, probably inspired by the preaching of three brothers – Walter, Thomas, and Bartholomew Legate. Seekers considered all organised churches of their day corrupt and preferred to wait for God's revelation. Many of them subsequently joined the Religious Society of Friends (Quakers).

== Origins ==
Long before the English Civil War there already existed what the English Marxist historian, Christopher Hill, calls a "lower-class heretical culture" in England. The cornerstones of this culture were anti-clericalism and a strong emphasis on Biblical study, but specific doctrines had "an uncanny persistence": millenarianism, mortalism, anti-Trinitarianism and a rejection of predestination. Such ideas became "commonplace to seventeenth-century Baptists, Seekers, early Quakers and other radical groupings which took part in the free-for-all discussions of the English Revolution."

== Beliefs and practices ==
The Seekers were not an organised religious group in any way that would be recognised today (not a religious cult or denomination), but informal and localised. Membership in a local Seekers assembly did not preclude membership in another sect. Indeed, Seekers shunned creeds (see nondenominational Christianity) and each assembly tended to embrace a broad spectrum of ideas.

Seekers after the Legates were Puritan but not Calvinist. Some contemporary historians, though accepting their zeal in desiring a "godly society", doubt whether the English Puritans during the English Revolution were as committed to religious liberty and pluralism as traditional histories have suggested. However, historian John Coffey's recent work has emphasised the contribution of a minority of radical Protestants who steadfastly sought toleration for so-called heresy, blasphemy, Catholicism, non-Christian religions, and even atheism. This minority included the Seekers, as well as the General Baptists. Their collective witness demanded the church to be an entirely voluntary, non-coercive community able to evangelise in a pluralistic society governed by a purely civil state. Such a demand was in sharp contrast to the ambitions of magisterial Protestantism held by the Calvinist majority. Nevertheless, in common with other Dissenters, the Seekers believed that the Roman Church corrupted itself and, through its common heritage, the Church of England as well. Only Christ himself could establish the "true" Church.

However, there were a number of beliefs and practices that made the Seekers distinctive from the large number of nonconformist dissenting groups that emerged around the time of the Commonwealth of England. Most significant was their form of collective worship; the Seekers held meetings free of all Church ritual and in silence, mindful of direct inspiration and guidance.

Seekers anticipated aspects of Quakerism and a significant number of them became Quakers and many remaining Seekers attended the funeral of George Fox. A contemporary and unsympathetic author, Richard Baxter, claimed that they had merged with the "Vanists" or followers of Henry Vane the Younger.

Often when "heretics" were faced with being burnt at the stake they retracted, retaining their beliefs in a less public way. The Legates were exceptional. Thomas died in Newgate Prison after being arrested for his preaching and Bartholomew was burnt for heresy in 1612.

== Influential "Seekers" ==
- William Erbery (or "Erbury") (1604–1654) is credited with convincing Oliver Cromwell's daughter to become a Seeker.
- John Saltmarsh's The Smoke in the Temple (1646) is an important statement of the Seekers' beliefs.
- William Walwyn (see the Levellers)

== See also ==
- Religion in the United Kingdom
- English Dissenters
- 17th century denominations in England
