= J. C. Davis =

British historian

- Born: James Colin Davis; 28 May 1940; Yorkshire, England
- Died: 25 July 2021 (aged 81); Glasgow, Scotland

Academic background
- Education: University of Manchester

Academic work
- Discipline: Historian
- Institutions: Victoria University of Wellington; University of East Anglia; Massey University; University of Waikato

James Colin Davis (28 May 1940 – 25 July 2021) was a British historian, whose work often focused on the Utopian thinkers of the 17th century. He has been described as a "historian of political and religious thought and a brilliant and provocative iconoclast". The book Liberty, Authority, Formality: Political Ideas and Culture, 1600-1900 was written in honour of Davis at the time of his retirement as professor.

== Life ==
Professor Colin Davis was born in Hesse, Yorkshire into a fisherman's family. He received his education at the University of Manchester and after a brief period at the Foreign and Commonwealth Office he moved to New Zealand to teach at the University of Waikato. He worked and studied at a number of universities in New Zealand before setting up the School of History at the University of East Anglia, Norwich. Davis retired in 2004. He subsequently moved to Glasgow where he died in July 2021.

== Books ==
Published in 2001, Davis's comprehensive study Oliver Cromwell was described as "the best analysis we have of Cromwell's religion and its politics" by the Journal of Modern History. Davis's 1986 work Fear, Myth and History: The Ranters and the Historians was particularly noted for questioning whether the radical, nonconformists known as the Ranters ever existed per se, being rather a myth created by conservatives to endorse traditional values by comparison with an unimaginably radical other. Other works by J. C. Davis include Utopia and the Ideal Society: A Study of English Utopian Writing, 1516-1700 (1983), and a biography of Gerrard Winstanley co-authored with J. D. Alsop for the Oxford Dictionary of National Biography.
