= Ranters =

17th-century English religious movement

The Ranters were one of a number of dissenting groups that emerged about the time of the Commonwealth of England (1649–1660). They were largely common people, and the movement was widespread throughout England, though they were not organised and had no leader.

== History ==
The chaos of the Second English Civil War, the execution of King Charles I, and the animosity between the Presbyterians and Independents during the era of the Commonwealth gave rise to many sectarian groups that attempted to make sense of their society and place within that society. The Ranters were one such group. They were regarded as heretical by the established Church and seem to have been regarded by the government as a threat to social order. The passage "the bishops, Charles and the Lords have had their turn, overturn, so your turn shall be next", published in a Ranter pamphlet, no doubt caused some concern in the halls of power. The Ranters denied the authority of churches, of Scripture, of the current ministry and of services, instead calling on men to listen to the divine within them. In many ways they resemble the 14th century Brethren of the Free Spirit. In fact, they were causing such controversy that by the early 1650s multiple anti-Ranter pamphlets were circulating throughout Britain.

The origin for the term "Ranter" seems to come from an anonymous pamphlet titled "A Justification of the Mad Crew", where the word 'rant' was used in reference to the enemies of those espousing this particular view, equating ranting with hypocrisy. The anonymous author calls those who would eventually be deemed Ranters "the Mad Crew" instead. There is also a confluence between the term "Ranter" with the passive verb 'rent', as in to be rent away from God. Most written evidence points to the use of "Ranter" as an insult by the enemies of the sect and not a self-designated moniker. By the 1660s, the term became attached to any group that promoted theological deviance but since most of the literary evidence we have was created by those opposed to Ranters in general, it is difficult to determine their exact creed.

There are few primary sources actually written by Ranters, but those that do exist give us a clearer picture of what they believed. The most famous English member, Laurence Clarkson or Claxton, joined the Ranters after encountering them in 1649. Although he does not mention them directly, his 1650 tract called A Single Eye is widely believed to have been inspired by this dissenting group and directly reflects their views. Other less well known members of the Ranter cohort included Abiezer Coppe and Joseph Salmon.

Their central idea was pantheistic, that God is essentially in every creature, including themselves.

If God be in all things, then in all creatures that hath live whatsoever, so that wherein is man better than these, or hath any pre-eminence above these?

— Laurence Clarkson, A Single Eye (1650).

My most excellent Majesty (in me) hath strangely and variously transformed this form. And behold, by mine own Almightiness (in me) I have been changed in a moment, in the twinkling of an eye, at the sound of the trump.

— Abiezer Coppe, A Fiery Flying Roll (1649).

They embraced antinomianism and believed that Christians are freed by grace from the necessity of obeying Mosaic Law, rejecting the very notion of obedience. They held that believers are free from all traditional restraints and that sin is a product only of the imagination. The Ranters revived the Brethren of the Free Spirit's amoralism and "stressed the desire to surpass the human condition and become godlike".

... for indeed sin hath its conception only in the imagination; therefore; so long as the act was in God, or nakedly produced by God, it was as holy as God ...

— Laurence Clarkson, A Single Eye (1650)

I can if it be my will, kiss and hug ladies, and love my neighbour's wife as myself, without sin.

— Abiezer Coppe, A Fiery Flying Roll (1649)

They denied the authority of the church, of accepted religious practice and of Scripture. In fact, they denied the power of any authority in general.

No matter what Scripture, Saints, or Churches say, if that within thee do not condemn thee, thou shalt not be condemned.

— Laurence Clarkson, A Single Eye (1650)

Kings, Princes, Lords, great ones, must bow to the poorest Peasants.

— Abiezer Coppe, A Fiery Flying Roll (1649)

Gerrard Winstanley, a leader of another English dissenting group called the Diggers, characterised Ranter principles as amounting to the excessive enjoyment of "meat, drinke, pleasures, and women". However, another prominent Digger, William Everard, was, some time after the failure of the Digger communes, imprisoned as a Ranter, and later confined to Bethlem Hospital. John Bunyan, author of Pilgrim's Progress, wrote in his autobiography, Grace Abounding to the Chief of Sinners, that he had encountered Ranters prior to his Baptist conversion.

In England, they came into contact and even rivalry with the early Quakers, who were often falsely accused of direct association with them. In the American colonies, there is evidence that Ranters were actually breakaway Quakers who did not agree with the standardization of belief that occurred in the late 1670s. Although the Quakers retained their loose, sect-like character until the 1660s, they began to formalize their worship practices and set of beliefs in order to gain some stability in the New World; this in turn pushed out those who did not fall in line, creating a group of people referred to as Ranters. (Whether these people were directly inspired by the Ranters in England or if the moniker was simply imported via anti-Ranter pamphlets that were so popular during this era is debatable.)

The historian J. C. Davis has suggested that the Ranters were a myth created by conservatives in order to endorse traditional values by comparison with an unimaginably radical other. Richard L. Greaves, in a review of Davis' book, suggests that though a very radical fringe existed, it was probably never as organized as conservatives of the time suggested.

In the mid-19th century, the name was often applied to the Primitive Methodists, with reference to their crude and often noisy preaching.

== See also ==
- Jacob Bauthumley
- Abiezer Coppe
- John Robins
- Seekers
- 17th-century denominations in England
- Christian anarchism
