= William M. Lamont =

English historian (1934–2018)

William Montgomerie Lamont (1934 – 31 December 2018) was an English historian of Puritanism and early Modern England. He took his degree in history from Queen Mary University of London. He taught at Hackney Downs School (1959–63), was lecturer in history at the University of Aberdeen (1963–66), and was thereafter at the University of Sussex (1966–99). He wrote monographs on Richard Baxter and the Muggletonians.

== Bibliography ==
- Marginal Prynne, 1600–1669 (London, 1963).
- Godly Rule: Politics and Religion, 1603–1660 (London, 1969)
- (eds. with Sybil Oldfield) Politics, Religion, and Literature in the Seventeenth Century (London, 1975).
- Richard Baxter and the Millenium (London, 1979).
- (with Christopher Hill and Barry Reay) The World of the Muggletonians (London, 1982).
- Puritanism and Historical Controversy (London, 1996).
- Last Witnesses: the Muggletonian History, 1652–1979 (Aldershot, 2006)
