= 1676 in literature =

This article contains information about the literary events and publications of 1676.

== Events ==
- March 2 – George Etherege's play The Man of Mode is given its first performance, in London.
- May 22 – Samuel Pepys is elected Master of Trinity House.
- December 11 – The first performance of William Wycherley's play The Plain Dealer is given in London.
- December – The German mathematician and philosopher Gottfried Leibniz arrives in Hanover to take up a post as "councillor" and librarian to Johann Friedrich, Duke of Brunswick-Calenberg.

== New books ==
=== Prose ===
- Robert Barclay – Theses Theologiae
- Roger Boyle, 1st Earl of Orrery – English-Adventures by a Person of Honor
- Charles Cotton – Cotton's Angler (a continuation of Izaak Walton's The Compleat Angler)
- Ann, Lady Fanshawe – Memoir (of her deceased courtier husband, Sir Richard Fanshawe, 1st Baronet)
- Domingo Fernández Navarrete – Tratados historicos, politicos, ethicos, y religiosos de la monarchia de China (An Account of the Empire of China, Historical, Political, Moral, and Religious)
- Gabriel de Foigny – La Terre Australe connue (The Southern Land, Known)
- Thomas Tomkinson – Truth's Triumph. A book on Muggletonianism.
- Izaak Walton – The Compleat Angler, 5th edition

=== Drama ===
- Roger Boyle, 1st Earl of Orrery (?) – Zoroastres
- John Crowne –The Country Wit
- Thomas Duffet – Beauty's Triumph (masque)
- Thomas d'Urfey
  - The Fool Turned Critic
  - Madam Fickle
- George Etherege – The Man of Mode
- Nathaniel Lee – Gloriana, or the Court of Augustus Caesar
- Thomas Otway – Don Carlos, Prince of Spain
- Edward Ravenscroft – The Wrangling Lovers
- Thomas Rawlins – Tom Essence
- Elkanah Settle
  - Pastor Fido
  - The Conquest of China by the Tartars
  - Ibrahim, the Illustrious Bassa (adapted from a story by Madeleine de Scudéry)
- Thomas Shadwell
  - The Libertine
  - The Virtuoso
- William Wycherley – The Plain Dealer
- Agustín Moreto
  - El lindo don Diego
  - No puede ser...
  - El parecido en la corte
  - Verdadera III parte de comedias

== Births ==
- June 21 – Anthony Collins, English philosopher (died 1729)
- July 4 – José de Cañizares, Spanish dramatist (died 1750)
- October 8 – Benito Jerónimo Feijóo y Montenegro, Spanish scholar and monk (died 1764)
- Unknown dates
  - Péter Apor, Hungarian historian writing in Latin (died 1752)
  - Samuel Bownas, English Quaker religious writer (died 1753)
  - William Gwavas, English lawyer and writer in the Cornish language (died 1741)

== Deaths ==
- March 22 – Lady Anne Clifford, English patron and correspondent (born 1590)
- July 27 – François Hédelin, abbé d'Aubignac, French writer and cleric (born 1604)
- August 17 – Hans Jakob Christoffel von Grimmelshausen, German writer (born 1621)
- September 2 – Edward Worsley, English religious writer (born 1605)
- October 25 – Justus Georg Schottel, German grammarian (born 1612)
- November 1 – Gisbertus Voetius, Dutch theologian (born 1589)
- December 18 – Edward Benlowes, English poet (born 1603)
- December 25 – William Cavendish, 1st Duke of Newcastle, English polymath (born 1592)
