= 1671 in literature =

This article presents lists of the literary events and publications in 1671.

== Events ==
- February – Nell Gwyn retires from the stage and moves into a brick townhouse at 79 Pall Mall, London.
- November 9 – The Duke's Company open their new venue, the Dorset Garden Theatre.
- Antoinette du Ligier de la Garde Deshoulières is awarded the first prize given for poetry by the Académie française.
- Philosophus Autodidactus, the first Latin translation of Ibn Tufail's 12th century tale Hayy ibn Yaqdhan, prepared by Edward Pococke before 1660, is published for the first time.

== New books ==
=== Prose ===
- Edward Bagshaw (attributed) – The Life and Death of Mr Vavasor Powell
- Edward Burrough (died 1663) – The Memorable Works of a Son of Thunder and Consolation: Namely, that True Prophet, and Faithful Servant of God, and Sufferer for the Testimony of Jesus, Edward Burroughs...
- Marie-Catherine de Villedieu – Les Amours des Grands Hommes
- Johann Ferdinand Hertodt – Crocologia
- John Josselyn – New England's Rarities, discovered in Birds, Beasts, Fishes, Serpents, and Plants of that Country (London)
- Gottfried Leibniz – Hypothesis Physica Nova (`New Physical Hypothesis')
- Pierre Martin de La Martinière – Voyage des pays septentrionaux (A New Voyage to the North)
- Arnoldus Montanus – De nieuwe en Onbekende Weereld of Beschryving van America (The Unknown New World or Description of the Continent America)
- Isaac Newton – Method of Fluxions
- Jane Sharp – The Midwives Book: or the Whole Art of Midwifry Discovered

=== Children ===
- James Janeway – A Token for Children (two parts)

=== Drama ===
- Aphra Behn – The Amorous Prince (adapted from Robert Davenport's The City Nightcap)
- Pedro Calderon de la Barca – El santo rey don Fernando
- John Caryll – Sir Solomon Single
- Pierre Corneille – Tite et Bérénice
- John Corye – The Generous Enemies
- John Crowne
  - Charles VIII of France
  - Juliana
- John Dryden – The Assignation, or Love in a Nunnery
- Edward Howard – The Six Days' Adventure
- Elizabeth Polwheele – The Frolicks
- Samuel Pordage – Herod and Mariamne
- Edward Ravenscroft – Mamamouchi
- Edward Revet – The Town Shifts
- Elkanah Settle – Cambyses
- George Villiers, 2nd Duke of Buckingham & others – The Rehearsal
- William Wycherley – Love in a Wood

=== Poetry ===
- Carlo Alessandro Guidi - Poesie liriche d'Alessandro Guidi consagrate all'Altessa Serenissima di Ranuccio II Farnese duca di Parma, e di Piacenza
- John Milton – Paradise Regained and Samson Agonistes

== Births ==
- April 6 – Jean-Baptiste Rousseau, French dramatist and poet (died 1741)
- September 7 – Antoine Danchet, French dramatist and poet (died 1748)
- November 6 – Colley Cibber, English playwright and Poet Laureate (died 1757)
- Unknown date – Gustaf Adlerfelt, Swedish historian (died 1709)
- Unknown date, possibly 1672 – Sarah Dixon, English poet (died 1765)

== Deaths ==
- January 1 – Hardouin de Péréfixe de Beaumont, French historian and cleric (born 1606)
- January 22 – Odorico Raynaldi, Italian historian (born 1595)
- February 22 – Adam Olearius, German librarian and scholar (born 1603)
- July 14 – Méric Casaubon, Swiss-born English classicist (born 1599)
- September 28 – Jean de Montigny, French philosopher and poet (born 1636)
- December 28 – Johann Friedrich Gronovius, German classicist (born 1611)
