= 1680 in literature =

This article contains information about the literary events and publications of 1680.

== Events ==
- February – Thomas Otway's blank verse tragedy The Orphan, or The Unhappy Marriage is premiered in London.
- The spring/summer production of Nathaniel Lee's Theodosius at Dorset Garden features Henry Purcell's earliest theatre music.
- August 8 – The Comédie-Française is founded by decree of King Louis XIV to merge the two Parisian acting troupes of the time, those of the Guénégaud Theatre and the Hôtel de Bourgogne.
- unknown dates
  - The poem-book Leabhar Cloinne Aodha Buidhe is transcribed by Ruairí Ó hUiginn of Sligo at the command of Cormac Ó Neill.
  - Innerpeffray Library, the oldest known (and surviving) public (lending) library in Scotland, is established.

== New books ==
=== Prose ===
- John Bunyan – The Life and Death of Mr. Badman
- Gilbert Burnet – Some Passages of the Life and Death of...John Earl of Rochester
- Sor Juana Inéz de la Cruz – Neptuno alegórico
- Pedro Cubero – Peregrinación del mundo
- Pu Songling – Strange Stories from a Chinese Studio (in manuscript only)
- Sir Robert Filmer – Patriarcha published (written 1642)

=== Drama ===
- Aphra Behn – The Revenge
- Pedro Calderón de la Barca – Hado y Divisa de Leonido y Marfisa
- John Crowne – The Misery of Civil War, adapted from Shakespeare's Henry VI, Part 2 and Part 3
- Bernard le Bovier de Fontenelle – Aspar
- Nathaniel Lee
  - Lucius Junius Brutus
  - The Princess of Cleve
  - Theodosius
- Lewis Maidwell – The Loving Enemies
- Thomas Otway
  - The History and Fall of Caius Marius published
  - The Orphan
  - The Soldier's Fortune
- Jacques Pradon – Statira
- Elkanah Settle
  - Fatal Love
  - The Female Prelate
- Nahum Tate – The Loyal General
- William Whitaker – The Conspiracy

== Births ==
- January 23 – Joseph Ames, English author (died 1759)
- September 22 – Barthold Heinrich Brockes, German poet (died 1747)
- Unknown dates
  - Nicola Coleti, Italian historian and priest (died 1765)
  - Lady Elizabeth Germain, English philanthropist and correspondent (died 1769)
- Probable year of birth
  - Ephraim Chambers, English encyclopedist (died 1740)
  - Cathal Buí Mac Giolla Ghunna, Irish poet in Gaelic (died 1756)
  - Nezim Frakulla, Albanian poet (died 1760)

== Deaths ==
- January 20 – Ann, Lady Fanshawe, English memoirist (born 1625)
- March 14 – René Le Bossu, French critic (born 1631)
- March 17 – François de La Rochefoucauld, French dramatist and writer of maxims (born 1613)
- March 27 – William Maurice, Welsh antiquary (born c.1620)
- June 18 – Samuel Butler, English satirical poet (born 1612)
- July 3 – John Martyn, English publisher and bookseller
- July 26 – John Wilmot, 2nd Earl of Rochester, English poet (born 1647)
- November – Carr Scrope, English poet (born 1649)
- December 4 – Thomas Bartholin, Danish scientist and theologian (born 1616)
- unknown date – François de Grenaille, French dramatist and translator (born 1616)
