= Elizabeth Currer =

Irish actress

Elizabeth Currer was an Irish stage actress of the Restoration Era. She was a member of the Duke's Company during the 1670s and subsequently part of the merged United Company from 1682. Although she was likely acting in London several years earlier than this, her first known role was in The Conquest of China in 1675. Due to the irregular spelling of the time her surname is sometimes written as Carrier, Corer and Currier amongst other variants.

== Selected roles ==
- Alcinda in The Conquest of China by Elkanah Settle (1675)
- Betty Frisque in The Country Wit by John Crowne (1676)
- Asteria in Ibrahim by Elkanah Settle (1676)
- Clarinda in The Virtuoso by Thomas Shadwell (1676)
- Mrs Hadland in The Counterfeit Bridegroom by Aphra Behn (1677)
- Lady Fancy in Sir Patient Fancy by Aphra Behn (1678)
- Madame Tricklove in Squire Oldsapp by Thomas Durfey (1678)
- Marcella in The Feign'd Curtizans by Aphra Behn (1679)
- Jenny Wheedle in The Virtuous Wife by Thomas Durfey (1679)
- Queen in The Loyal General by Nahum Tate (1679)
- Lady Eleanor Butler in The Misery of Civil War by John Crowne (1680)
- Euginia in The London Cuckolds by Edward Ravenscroft (1681)
- Isabella in The False Count by Aphra Behn (1681)
- Acquilina in Venice Preserved by Thomas Otway (1682)
- Lady Medler in Mr. Turbulent by Anonymous (1682)
- Diana in The City Heiress by Aphra Behn (1682)
- Mrs Featly in Dame Dobson by Edward Ravenscroft (1683)
- Isabella in A Duke and No Duke by Nahum Tate (1684)
- Widow Ranter in The Widow Ranter by Aphra Behn (1689)

== Bibliography ==
- Highfill, Philip H, Burnim, Kalman A. & Langhans, Edward A. A Biographical Dictionary of Actors, Actresses, Musicians, Dancers, Managers, and Other Stage Personnel in London, 1660-1800: Corye to Dynion. SIU Press, 1975.
- Howe, Elizabeth. The First English Actresses: Women and Drama, 1660-1700. Cambridge University Press, 1992.
