= Matthew Medbourne =

English actor

Matthew Medbourne (died 19 March 1680) was an English stage actor and occasional playwright of the Restoration era. A long-standing member of the Duke's Theatre, Medbourne was a victim of the Popish Plot scare and died in Newgate Prison.

Medbourne was a Roman Catholic, but little is known about him before he emerged as a member of the Duke's Company at Lincoln's Inn Fields during the 1661–62 season. His first confirmed role is as Delio in The Duchess of Malfi in 1662. Around the time of the Great Plague, he wrote a play Saint Cecily, a tragedy which was never acted.In December 1669 he was arrested for disorderly conduct, and was suspended from the Duke's Company for a period but was fully returned by 1671. In 1670 he had written a version of Tartuffe which was staged at the Theatre Royal, Drury Lane. He remained with the Duke's at the new Dorset Garden Theatre until 1678.

In 1676 Medbourne helped Titus Oates to join the household of Henry Howard, 7th Duke of Norfolk as the latter's Anglican chaplain to minister to Protestant members of the Catholic Duke's household. Oates was later dismissed for his poor preaching.

In October 1678 Medbourne was accused of High Treason during the scare of Popish Plot stirred by Oates. He was arrested and imprisoned in Newgate the following month. Increasingly ill during his confinement he died on 19 March 1680.

== Selected roles ==
- Herod in Herod and Mariamne by Samuel Pordage (1663)
- Filomarini in The Slighted Maid by Robert Stapylton (1663)
- Capito in The Stepmother by Robert Stapylton (1663)
- Thuricus in Mustapha by Roger Boyle (1665)
- Smerdis in Cambyses, King Of Persia by Elkanah Settle (1671)
- Friendly in The Town Shifts by Edward Revet (1671)
- Alphonso in Charles VIII of France by John Crowne (1671)
- Sir Grave Solymour in The Six Days' Adventure by Edward Howard (1671)
- Theodore in Juliana by John Crowne (1671)
- Don Gerardo in The Fatal Jealousy by Henry Nevil Payne (1672)
- Lysander in The Reformation by Joseph Arrowsmith (1673)
- Hametalhaz in The Empress of Morocco by Elkanah Settle (1673)
- Muchland in The Morning Ramble by Henry Nevil Payne (1673)
- Clarmount in Love and Revenge by Elkanah Settle (1674)
- Agis in Alcibiades by Thomas Otway (1675)
- King of China in The Conquest of China by Elkanah Settle (1675)
- Lord Drybone in The Country Wit by John Crowne (1676)
- Captain Tilbury in Madam Fickle by Thomas D'Urfey (1676)
- Montano in Pastor Fido by Elkanah Settle (1676)
- Mendozo in Abdelazer by Aphra Behn (1676)
- Morat in Ibrahim by Elkanah Settle (1676)
- Rui Gomez in Don Carlos, Prince of Spain by Thomas Otway (1676)
- Paulinus in Titus and Berenice by Thomas Otway (1676)
- Moncado in The Wrangling Lovers by Edward Ravenscroft (1676)
- Lysimachus in The Siege of Babylon by Samuel Pordage (1677)
- Carles in The Counterfeits by John Leanerd (1678)
- Agamemnon in The Destruction of Troy by John Banks (1678)

== Bibliography ==
- Highfill, Philip H, Burnim, Kalman A. & Langhans, Edward A. A Biographical Dictionary of Actors, Actresses, Musicians, Dancers, Managers & Other Stage Personnel in London, 1660-1800, Volume 10. SIU Press, 1973.
