= Green room =

Waiting room and lounge for performers

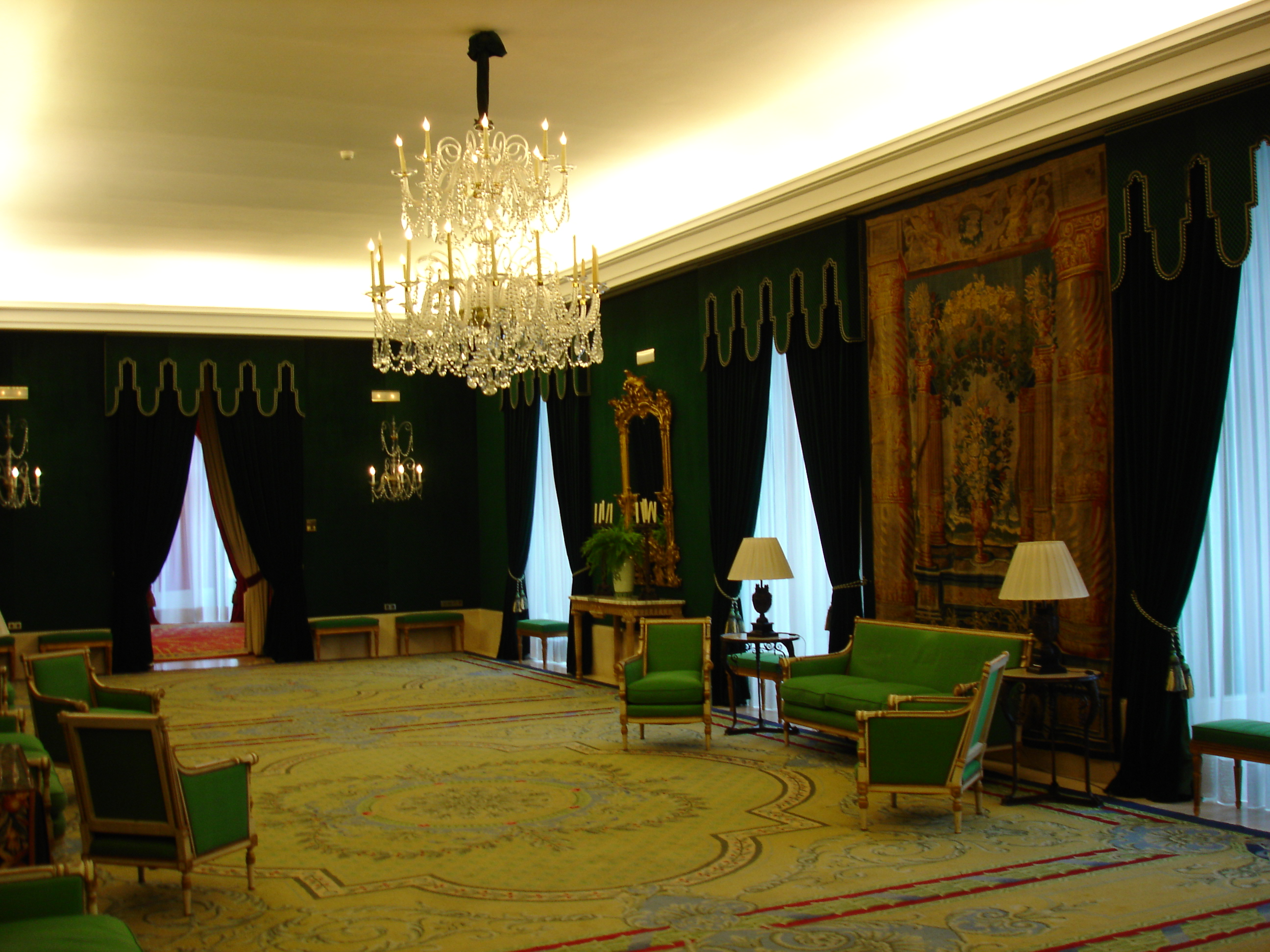
Salón Verde ("Green Hall"), a green room at the Teatro Real in Madrid, Spain. The chairs, curtains and walls are predominantly green.

In show business, the green room (or sometimes greenroom) is the space in a theatre, or a similar venue, that functions as a waiting room and lounge for performers before, during, and after a performance or show when they are not engaged on stage. Green rooms typically have seating for the performers, such as upholstered chairs and sofas.

The origin of the term is often ascribed to such rooms historically being painted green. Modern green rooms need not necessarily adhere to a specifically green colour scheme, though the theatrical tradition of the name remains.

Some English theatres contained several green rooms, each ranked according to the status, fame, and salary of the actor: one could be fined for using a green room above one's station.

== Possible sources of the term ==
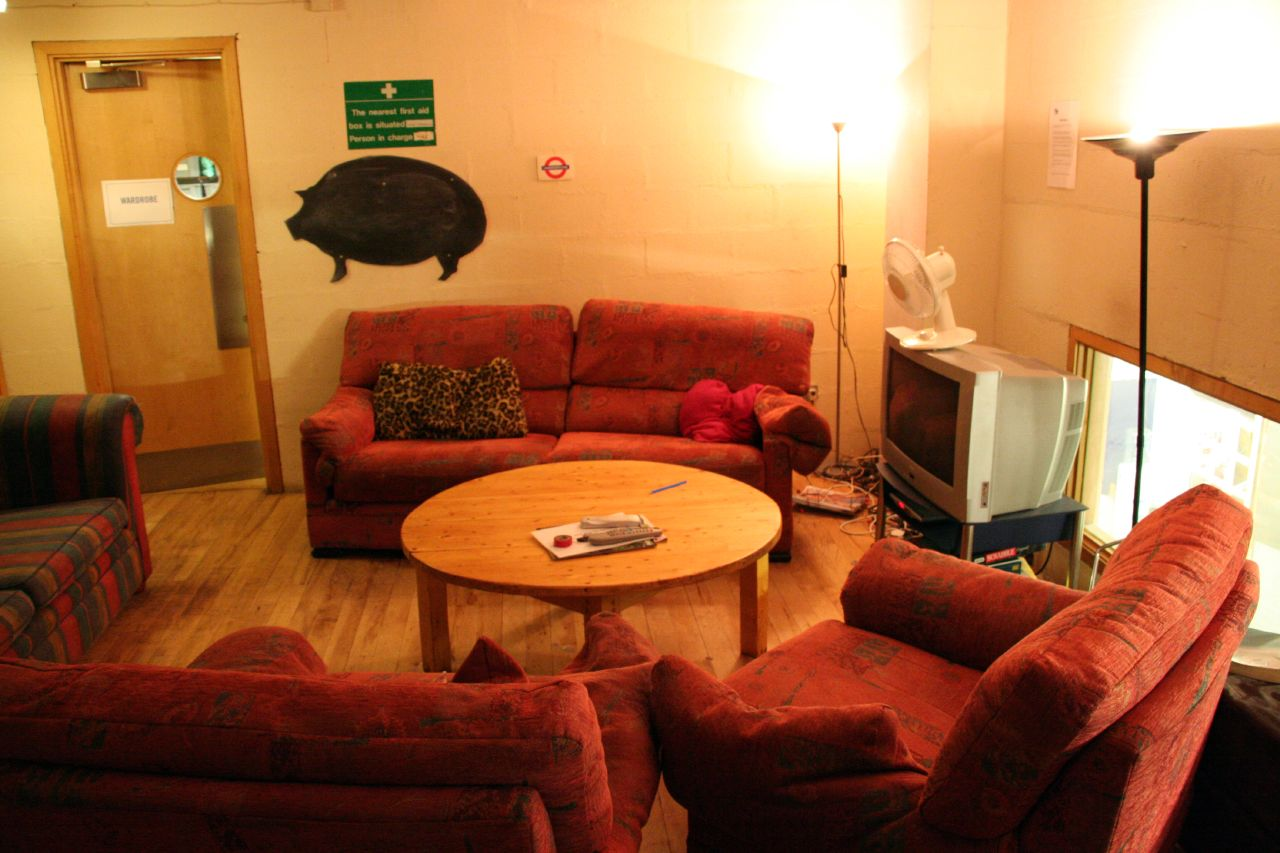
The green room at the Traverse Theatre, Edinburgh

As often in etymological questions, the precise origins of a term are difficult to establish. This has led to many folk-etymological hypotheses and claims for high-profile terms such as green room.

William J. Lawrence notes that, while it is unknown when a behind-the-scenes room was first established for actors to rest while waiting to go on stage, such a room is seemingly first mentioned in 1667 by Samuel Pepys, who refers to it as the "scene room". Lawrence notes that the first appearance of the term "green room" is potentially in 1679, in Thomas Shadwell's A True Window [sic], and "scene room" and "green room" seem to be used interchangeably for much of the Restoration era, after which "scene room" began to fall out of usage. Lawrence speculates that the switch to "green" may have arisen as the result of a "rhyming substitution". A 1662 renovation of London's Cockpit-in-Court theatre, which included a green baize carpeted dressing room, has also been suggested as the origin of the term. It has also been theorised that such waiting rooms were originally painted green to "relieve the eyes from the glare of the stage." On the other hand, early stage lighting was by candlelight and later by gaslight, so the "glare" might well be apocryphal, a modern reference to bright stage lighting.

Richard Southern, in his studies of medieval theatre in the round, states that in this period the acting area was referred to as 'the green'. This central space, often grass-covered, was used by the actors, while the surrounding space and circular banks were occupied by the spectators; Southern states that 'the green' has been a traditional actors' term for the stage ever since. Even in proscenium arch theatres, there was a tradition that a green stage cloth should be used for a tragedy. The green room could thus be considered the transition room on the way to the green/stage. Technical staff at some West End theatres (such as the London Coliseum) still refer to the stage as 'the green'.

It is sometimes said that the term 'green room' was a response to limelight, though the name is merely a coincidence – the "lime" in "limelight" refers to calcium oxide, not to the fruit or colour. Furthermore, limelight was invented in 1820 and the term "green room" was used many years prior to that. The term 'green room' is also attributed to the makeup worn by actors; long before modern makeup was invented, the actors had to apply makeup before a show and allow it to set up or cure before performing. Until the makeup was cured, it was 'green', and people were advised to sit quietly in the 'green room' until such time as the makeup was stable enough for performing.

It is possible that 'green room' might be a corruption of 'scene room', the room where scenery was stored which doubled as the actors' waiting and warm-up room. Many actors also experience nervous anxiety before a performance, and one of the symptoms of nervousness is nausea. As a person who feels nauseous is often said to look "green", suggesting that the 'green room' is the place where the nervous actors wait. Comedian and dancer Max Wall attributes the phrase to Cockney rhyming slang, where 'greengage' is 'stage', therefore 'greengage room' is 'stage room'; like most rhyming slang, the term was shortened, hence '"green" room'. Rhyming slang can be traced only as early as the 1840s, whereas the phrase "green room" predates this by several centuries, making such an etymology unlikely.

=== "Tiring houses" ===
In Shakespeare's day, the actors waited in a "tiring house" probably because actors were attired (put on or changed costumes) in this space. Here it is mentioned by Peter Quince as he plans for his acting troupe to rehearse in the woods:

QUINCE: Pat, pat; and here's a marvellous convenient place for our rehearsal. This green plot shall be our stage, this hawthorn-brake our tiring-house; and we will do it in action as we will do it before the duke.

— A Midsummer Night's Dream (approx 1595) - Act 3 Scene 1

Samuel Pepys mentions these locations at the Drury Lane Theatre Royal in 1667:

...she took us up into the Tireing-rooms and to the women's Shift, where Nell was dressing herself and...then below into the Scene-room, and...here I read the Qu's (cues) to Knepp while she answered me, through all her part of Flora's Figarys...

— Samuel Pepys

== Other mentions ==
- Thomas Shadwell's Restoration comedy, A True Widow (1678), mentions in Act Four: Stanmore : "No madam: Selfish, this Evening, in a green Room, behind the Scenes, was before-hand with me..."
- The term "green room" is mentioned in Colley Cibber's Love Makes a Man (1701). "I do know London pretty well, and the Side-box, Sir, and behind the Scenes; ay, and the Green-Room, and all the Girls and Women~Actresses there."
- In his Life of Samuel Johnson (1791), James Boswell mentions visits by his subject to the Green Room at the Drury Lane Theatre.
- In 1792, Joseph Haslewood published a collection of memoirs of the actors and actresses of the London theatres entitled The Secret History of the Green-Room, while 1796 saw the first edition of John Roach's similarly themed Authentic Memoirs of the Green-Room.
- In the Jane Austen novel Mansfield Park (1814), when the Bertram children convert the billiard room into a theatre, Tom Bertram notes, "And my father's room will be an excellent green-room. It seems to join the billiard room on purpose."
- In the 1853 Charlotte Brontë novel Villette the narrator refers to the green-room when preparing for a performance in an amateur play.
- Jerome K. Jerome's first book comically describes his stint in English theatre during the late 1870s. "There was no green room. There never had been a green room. I never saw a green room, except in a play, though I was always on the lookout for it."
- The green room is mentioned in the 1891 Sherlock Holmes short story "The Man with the Twisted Lip" by Sir Arthur Conan Doyle. "When an actor I had, of course, learned all the secrets of making up, and had been famous in the green-room for my skill."
- Within the context of international organizations such as the World Trade Organization (WTO), the "Green Room meeting" refers to a process in which ambassadors seek consensus informally under the chairmanship of the Director-General. "Green Room meetings often run until the early hours of the morning and can stretch out for days. They can also be tense and dramatic settings in which nerves are taut and tempers evident." The Director-General meeting room at the WTO headquarters Centre William Rappard is called the Green Room since the time the building was occupied by the International Labour Office.
- The first song on Ken Carson's 2023 album A Great Chaos is titled "Green Room".
