= 1673 in literature =

This article presents lists of the literary events and publications in 1673.

== Events ==
- February 10 – The première of Molière's comédie-ballet The Imaginary Invalid (also translated as The Hypochondriac) takes place in Paris. During the fourth performance, on February 17, the playwright, playing the title rôle, collapses on stage, dying soon after.
- Thomas Killigrew is appointed Master of the Revels in England, on the death of his predecessor, Sir Henry Herbert.
- In response to events of the Third Anglo-Dutch War, John Dryden's topical play Amboyna, about happenings in the East Indies, is reportedly "contrived and written in a month" – certainly one of the fastest acts of solo dramatic composition known. The play is premièred on stage in May.
- Elkanah Settle's tragedy The Empress of Morocco, premièred on July 3 at the Dorset Gardens Theatre in London by the Duke's Company, is published in quarto; in addition to its frontispiece illustration, the quarto contains five woodcuts depicting scenes in the play – the first English play text illustrated in this way. Settle's play also inspires a farce with the same title, probably by Thomas Duffet, performed by the King's Company and published the following year.
- Archpriest Petrovich Avvakum writes his Zhitie (Life), as the first Russian autobiography.
- Antonio Magliabechi is appointed librarian to Cosimo III de' Medici, Grand Duke of Tuscany.

== New books ==
=== Prose ===
- Bathsua Makin – An Essay to Revive the Ancient Education of Gentlewomen
- England's appeal from the Private Cabal at Whitehall to the Great Council of the Nation by a true Lover of his Country – pamphlet attributed to Sir William Coventry
- Francis Kirkman – The Unlucky Citizen
- John Ray – Observations topographical, moral, and physiological, made on a Journey through part of the Low Countries, Germany, Italy, and France
- Johannes Schefferus – Lapponia
- Shugi Washo
- Sir William Temple, 1st Baronet – Observations upon the United Provinces of the Netherlands
- Thomas Traherne – Roman Forgeries

=== Drama ===
- Joseph Arrowsmith – The Reformation
- Aphra Behn – The Dutch Lover
- Pedro Calderon de la Barca – La vida es sueño (sacramental play)
- Sir William Davenant – News from Plymouth, The Law Against Lovers, The Fair Favourite, and The Siege published posthumously
- John Dryden
  - Amboyna, or the Cruelties of the Dutch to the English Merchants
  - Marriage à la Mode
- Thomas Duffet – The Spanish Rogue
- Molière – Le malade imaginaire
- Henry Nevil Payne – The Fatal Jealousy
- Edward Ravenscroft – The Careless Lovers
- Elkanah Settle – The Empress of Morocco

=== Poetry ===
- Poems of Mr. John Milton (2nd edition)
- Bernarda Ferreira de la Cerda – España libertada (second part)

== Births ==
- January 1 – Johannes Kelpius, German Pietist writer (died 1708)
- October 26 – Dimitrie Cantemir, Moldavian prince and man of letters (died 1723)
- Unknown dates
  - Antoine Banier, French historian and translator (died 1741)
  - George Lockhart, Scottish politician and writer (died 1731)
  - John Oldmixon, English historian (died 1742)

== Deaths ==
- February 17 – Molière (Jean-Baptiste Poquelin), French playwright (born 1622)
- March – Joseph Caryl, English Biblical commentator and preacher (born 1602)
- March 15 – Salvator Rosa, Italian painter and poet (born 1615)
- May 4 – Richard Brathwait, English poet (born 1588)
- November 16 – Katarina Zrinska, Croatian poet (born c. 1625)
- December 15 – Margaret Cavendish, English writer and scientist (born 1623)
- Unknown date – Ingen (Yinyuan Longqi), Chinese-born Buddhist poet (born 1592)
