= The Conquest of China =

1675 play

- Original language: English
- Written by: Elkanah Settle
- Based on: Bellum Tartaricum
- Genre: Tragedy

Premiere
- Date: 28 May 1675
- Place: Dorset Garden Theatre, London

The Conquest of China, by the Tartars is a 1675 heroic tragedy by the English writer Elkanah Settle. It was originally performed by the Duke's Company at the Dorset Garden Theatre in London. The play is set in Beijing during the Manchu conquest of the Ming Empire.

In a 1940 publication, Chinese writer and literary scholar Qian Zhongshu distinguished The Conquest of China as "the first piece of imaginative English literature on a Chinese subject".

The original cast included Thomas Gillow as Theinmingus, Henry Harris as Zungteus, Henry Norris as Palexus, Matthew Medbourne as King of China, William Smith as Quitazo, Samuel Sandford as Lycungus, Mary Betterton as Orunda, Elizabeth Currer as Alcinda, Mrs. Spencer as Vangona, and Mary Lee as Amavanga. Other characters include Legozun, a Villain of Lycungus's Party, Maskers, Messengers, Lords, Ladies, Guards, and Attendants.

== Background ==
The Conquest of China, By the Tartars is a fast paced, compact, and densely convoluted heroic drama in five acts written entirely in heroic couplets. Settle began writing The Conquest of China in 1671, working over the course of three years. The play premiered on 28 May, 1675.

Despite its title, the play is not centered around the grand conquest of China, but rather the petty romantic rivalries between three princes vying for the Chinese throne.

While Settle claims in his Epilogue that the play has "History and Truth for her Excuse", virtually none of the play bears any resemblance to historical reality or his source material, Act V being the only act which incorporates actual historical events, albeit heavily dramatized. The Chinese setting and characters are purely nominal and ornamental, with characters who dance in masquerade balls, wear laurel crowns, write with quills, and invoke Roman deities, the play following the standard structure and stylistic conventions typical of an English drama and Settle possessing very little understanding of any actual Chinese culture, customs, or geography outside of his source.

The play is highly imaginative, historically inaccurate, and completely fictionalized by Settle for the purposes of political allegory and theatrical dramatism. Settle appropriates the three-sided conflict between the Manchus, Ming Empire, and the rebels (represented in the play by Zungteus, King of China, and Lycungus) as a device to reflect on the English political anxieties regarding succession, social conflict, and stability of the crown during the Stuart Restoration. The rebel takeover of Lycungus and the death of the King of China mirroring the English Civil War and the execution of Charles I. In the play, Settle delivers a fanciful solution with little basis in reality by fundamentally transforming the conflict into an idealized heroic romance resolved by the power of love and courage, rather than military devastation and forced subjugation.

== Sources ==
Settle's play is very loosely based on Bellum Tartaricum, a 1654 English translation of De Bello Tartarico Historia, a detailed account of the Manchu conquest compiled and written by the Jesuit missionary and scholar Martino Martini who had witnessed the conquest unfold while on mission in China in 1642. It has been suggested Settle may have used Juan de Palafox y Mendoza's The History of the Conquest of China by the Tartars or Olfert Dapper's Atlas Chinensis, both translated the same year as when Settle began writing the play, though these are based on Martini's work and were disproven to be sources by Qian Zhongshu.

Though Settle intensively studied Bellum Tartaricum, he selectively borrowed elements and made up the rest of the play's plot around it. While some parts of the play align with major historical events, such as the mass suicides in the Ming court and the King of China writing a will in blood (based on the Chongzhen Emperor), Settle took many historical liberties, deviating significantly from the source material. Settle radically restructured and condensed decades of events to fit within the drama, such as King Theinmingus (based on the Manchu khan Nurhaci) and the main lead Zungteus (based on Manchu prince Hong Taiji), are portrayed as a duo present at the fall of Beijing with Zungteus being crowned as the emperor, in actuality Theinmingus would have been dead for over 18 years and Zungteus for nearly 9 months when the Manchus breached the city. Settle also changed many historical details to be more dramatic, such as Settle's King of China falling on his sword with the princes instead of hanging himself on a tree. Several romantic subplots of court intrigue were written into the story, such as the decisive alliance between Wu Sangui (Quitazo) and the Manchus against rebel leader Li Zicheng (Lycungus) at the Battle of Shanhai Pass being incorporated into the love story between Quitazo and Alcinda. To simplify the political complexities of the real conflict, Settle discarded emotional and nuanced characters for archetypes which act purely out of evil, vengeance, spite, jealousy, sudden infatuations, and mythical ideals of honor, such as transferring all evil traits onto Lycungus.

The principal characters of the play are based on historical figures, though heavily dramatized or otherwise greatly altered from their historical counterparts, such as changing Lycungus from a low-born, discontented peasant leader and rogue from Xi'an into an inherently malicious and sadistic prince driven by unrequited love and thirst for power. Theinmingus (a misspelling of Thienmingus erroneously used in the English translation) from Tianming (天命), Nurhaci's era name, Zungteus, from Chongde (崇德), Hong Taiji's reign name, prince Lycungus (or Licungus; a misspelling of Licungzus), based on the peasant rebel Li Zicheng, prince Quitazo (an invented name; originally named Usangueius), based on the general Wu Sangui. Amavanga, a young Queen who disguises herself as a soldier, is imaginatively extrapolated from Martini's recurring mentions of the famous "Heroick Lady... the Amazonian or Penthesilean of China" from Sichuan who saved several cities from rebels and Manchus, anonymously referring to Qin Liangyu, female Ming general; Settle portrays her as a young woman, whereas Qin Liangyu would have been around 70 when the play is set, while her name, Amavanga, is the feminized form of Amavangus, Martini's Latinization of Amawang (阿玛王), a name given to Manchu Prince-Regent and tutor Dorgon. A majority of the characters are entirely fabricated by Settle, their names being imitations of the Latinised Chinese names translated by Martini.

Despite numerous inaccuracies, Qian Zhongshu ironically notes that Settle's spurious addition of the heroic love interest Alcinda who is taken by Lycungus, causing Quitazo to invade Beijing with the help of Zungteus, inadvertently created a near-perfect parallel with the historical mistress of Wu Sangui, Chen Yuanyuan, whose capture by Li Zicheng in the Battle of Beijing caused him seek vengeance and ally with the Manchus.

== Plot ==
=== Acts I and II ===
The play opens in a Tartar camp outside the gates of Beijing. Theinmingus, King of Tartary, has invaded China to avenge his father, slain in the King of China's campaigns. His bloodthirsty son, Zungteus, is determined to destroy China.

The Chinese provincial queen Amavanga arrives as an ambassador of the King of China alongside her confidante Vangona, disguised as soldiers. Theinmingus dismisses her as delaying and orders immediate preparations for an assault on Beijing.

Vangona notices a glimmer in Zungteus's eye, suggesting Amavanga shed her disguise. Zungteus orders his confidant Palexus to launch the assault but Amavanga stops him, challenging him to a duel. He praises her courage, and they embrace, instantly falling in love with each other. Zungteus, emboldened by living in the Ming court as a child, has a sudden change of heart, abandoning his quest for revenge to pursue Amavanga.

In the Palace of Beijing, the King of China is faced with a succession crisis. The prince who marries his daughter, Orunda, shall inherit the throne. Twelve Ming princes enter the palace in a masquerade ball. Orunda instantly falls in love with the honorable Quitazo, but the King rebuffs, forcing her to select a second prince. She picks the horrible Lycungus, setting the two against princes each other. He divides his powers among them, entrusting Quitazo to lead the army as general and Lycungus to govern as regent. Lycungus, unsatisfied with dull administration, envies Quitazo's military might and affection from Orunda.

Quitazo is already betrothed to the innocent and humble Alcinda, attempting to part with Orunda, she only becomes even more enamored, whereas Lycungus pledges his absolute loyalty to Orunda, disgusted by him.

Quitazo and Alcinda meet and embrace. Their peace is intruded by Lycungus, who humors Quitazo with the wondrous power he will have when he marries Orunda. Lycungus stokes a fierce dispute, saying Quitazo had kidnapped Alcinda and forced her into a relationship. After Quitazo threatens to kill him, he feigns mistaking her for another woman named Lycanza, and apologizes. Quitazo plans to meet Alcinda in disguise. Lycungus lays out his plan to manipulate Orunda, eliminate Quitazo, and seize absolute power.

=== Act III ===
In the Tartar camp, the Tartars return from the assault on Beijing. Zungteus tells his father that the young ambassador from before is actually an exceptionally formidable warrior, seeing him behind wall of Tartar bodies. Zungteus praises his courage, saying he cannot bring himself to kill such a valiant foe.

In the Chinese camp, Amavanga enters with Vangona and her army of women, all disguised. Lycungus brings word from the King that she has won a laurel crown for saving the city. A messenger reminds her of the impending duel with Zungteus. She is reluctant but Vangona convinces her to go to protect her honor and show her love.

Back in the palace, Orunda learns of Quitazo's lover, wishing to kill them. Orunda appeals to her father of Quitazo's infidelity, who immediately condemns Quitazo and anyone associated with him to a torturous death, horrifying Orunda.

Alcinda runs in, pursued by slaves, pleads for her life. The King commands them to strangle her, but Orunda convinces him to spare her. They reconcile, but after Alcinda pines for Quitazo, Orunda orders for the slaves to kill her. She grants all of Quitazo's affection to Orunda for her life, but begins a dispute over who should have him. Orunda calls for the slaves to stab, strangle, and kill her, only for Alcinda to reveal she has conquered death. For her courage, she spitefully does not allow her to die.

Lycungus reveals to Orunda that Quitazo and Alcinda will meet under the Pagode-Grove to conspire the downfall of the empire. Lycungus plans to place an ambush of armed men to snatch Alcinda and force her to drink poison. Orunda, disappointed that she has no hand in the murder, disguises herself and concocts her own poison.

Quitazo and Alcinda meet. Quitazo finds himself ruined by fame, torn between taking the throne or true love. Alcinda reveals her dread of revenge from Orunda, but Quitazo consoles her, reaffirming their love even if it means death.

=== Act IV ===
Amavanga continues discussing the duel with Vangona. She is moved by Vangona, that the duel will bring peace, revenge the King of China, and that she and Zungteus will be reunited in Heaven. Amavanga wishes Vangona to hold her a private funeral if she dies.

The Tartars and Chinese gather under a truce on opposing sides for the duel. A herald reads out a treaty made by the King of China and Theinmingus that whoever loses the duel will become the tributary of the victor's empire.

Zungteus fatally strikes Amavanga in the duel, killing her. He laments her death and reveals she was a woman. Zungteus tears up the treaty, provoking his father. Zungteus renews challenge, which Quitazo accepts. Though the King of China finds Zungteus so godlike and powerful, he refuses to risk his general's life. Zungteus reminds the King that their truce expires tomorrow.

Vangona carries Amavanga's body away to her funeral but Zungteus keeps trying to follow her. Theinmingus summons Zungteus to a war council for the battle tomorrow. Zungteus considers falling upon his sword, but Palexus offers to be killed instead. Theinmingus returns, chiding Zungteus as an effeminate degenerate for killing himself over a woman. Zungteus hardens his resolve, leading the Tartar army to charge Beijing.

Disguised, Orunda steals from the court to hunt Alcinda in the Pagode-Grove. Quitazo and Alcinda meet, disguised as shepherds, retreating deeply into the grove. Arriving late, Lycungus's mercenaries miss Alcinda, mistakenly taking disguised Orunda instead. She explains her true identity but the greedy mercenaries force her to drink the poison anyway. Lycungus is shocked to find they have poisoned Orunda, admonishing them. Orunda wishes to see Quitazo and die in his arms.

Quitazo and Alcinda emerge from the trees. The dying Orunda has a sudden change of heart, repenting her maliceand relinquishing her claim to Quitazo. Quitazo and Alcinda mourn Orunda's death. Lycungus ambushes and seizes them, accusing Quitazo and Alcinda of poisoning Orunda. To protect Alcinda, Quitazo falsely confesses that he was the one who orchestrated the poisoning. He forgives his captors, and they are forced out of the grove.

King of China is shown Orunda's body and is determined to rack Quitazo and Alcinda as traitors for poisoning her. He bestows Lycungus power over all of China. With complete control, Lycungus is determined to kill the King and seize the throne for himself.

=== Act V ===
Zungteus mourns his father, who died of gangrene from a poisoned arrow in the battle. Quitazo and Vangona desert the city to inform Zungteus that Alcinda is captured has been captured by the tyrant Lycungus. Zungteus takes Palexus, Quitazo, and Vangona to get avenge his father and Alcinda.

At his desk, the deposed King of China is alerted by prince Legozun that Lycungus has slain the eight remaining Ming princes and gathered sixteen thousand law students to his council before having them burnt alive. The King orders Legozun to instruct his wives to kill themselves to escape from Lycungus's lust. Another Ming prince warns the King of China that Lycungus has arrived to murder him. The King bids his wives to witness him fight Lycungus, but Legozun reveals that all of his wives had killed themselves according to his order. The King of China uses his blood to write a will, passing the crown to Zungteus. The King of China and the final two princes commit suicide by falling on their swords.

Lycungus finds the King's bloody will and declares he will kill Zungteus. Three soldiers inform Lycungus that Quitazo has allied to the Tartars and is leading an army to depose him.

Quitazo and the Tartar army battle Lycungus, but he is surrounded and taken prisoner by Lycungus's men. Alcinda is brought in by guards, Lycungus plans to execute her and force Quitazo to drink her blood mixed with poison while he is torn on the rack and scorched by hot irons. Quitazo offers his life and loyalty in exchange for her safety, but Lycungus orders her execution anyway. A messenger interrupts him to report that Zungteus has broken Lycungus's rebel army.

Zungteus and his soldiers battle with Lycungus, slaying him, hailing "Long live Zungteus Emperour of China." Zungteus, having accomplished his quest for revenge, draws his sword to kill himself and reunite with Amavanga in Heaven. However, Quitazo and Vangona reveal that Amavanga is still alive, merely unconscious after their duel. Zungteus bestows Quitazo the crown of Tartary to civilize the barbaric Tartars, while he in China will teach the effeminate Chinese of warfare. The play ends as Zungteus exalts his wedding as the crowning triumph over all.

== Publication ==
The Conquest of China, By the Tartars was published a year after its first performance in 1676, printed in a quarto by Thomas Milbourn for William Cademan in London.

The print contained numerous printing errors which Settle openly blamed as being “Occasioned by the Over-sight, and ill Writing of the Transcriber”, being printed above of the book's errata.

== Critical reception ==
Historically, the play's reception was especially bad, being a "dismal failure" that left little to be said.

Contemporary writer Thomas Shadwell also disparaged the play, indirectly mocking Settle in the preface to his play, The Libertine, saying that an author "is believed to have been three years drudging upon the Conquest of China but he ought not to be called a Poet, who cannot write ten times better in three weeks."

In 1951, theatrical historian William W. Appleton scathingly criticized Settle's play, commenting "The action is as violent, the heroic couplets as relentless, and the characters' behavior as unnaturally motivated as any in the worst of heroic drama".

== Bibliography ==
- Chang, Dongshin. Representing China on the Historical London Stage: From Orientalism to Intercultural Performance. Routledge, 2015.
- Van Lennep, W. The London Stage, 1660-1800: Volume One, 1660-1700. Southern Illinois University Press, 1960.
