= The Feign'd Curtizans =

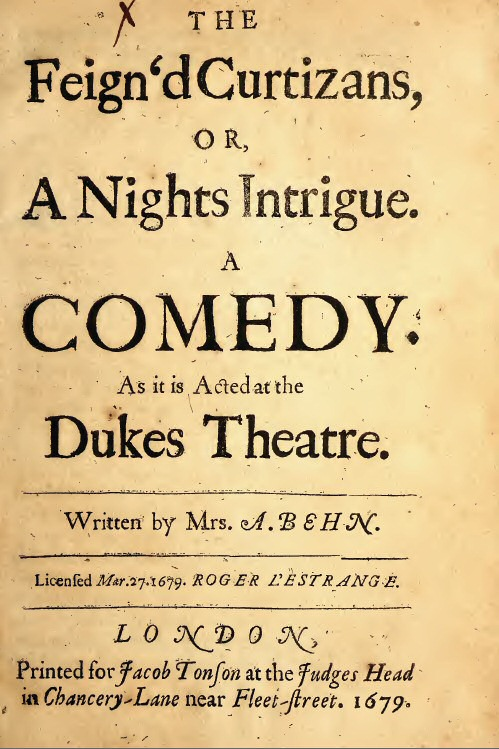
Title page of The Feign'd Curtizans, London, 1679

The Feign'd Curtizans, or, A Nights Intrigue is a 1679 comedic stage play by the English author Aphra Behn. Behn dedicated the play, originally performed at the Dorset Garden Theatre in London, to the well-known actress and mistress of King Charles II, Nell Gwyn.

== Historical Context ==
Set in Rome, The Feign’d Curtizans was written and performed after the advent of the Popish Plot. The play is sympathetic to Catholicism during a time when declaring one's Protestant beliefs was “politically expedient”. Behn uses the English characters of Sir Signall Buffoon and Mr. Tickletext to satirize their nationalism and fear of Italian “Popery,” while portraying several Italian characters of quality as honorable and virtuous. Behn “emphasizes that, while Whiggish middle-class patriots are to be derided, upper-class good taste is international”.

== Characters ==
=== Italians ===
- Morsini, an Old Count Uncle to Julio
- Julio, his nephew, a young Count, contracted to Laura Lucretia
- Octavio, a young Count contracted to Marcella, deformed and revengeful
- Crapine, Morsini's man
- Petro, supposed pimp to the two courtesans

=== Englishmen ===
- Sir Harry FIllamour, in love with Marcella
- Mr. Galliard. in love with Cornelia
- Sir Signall Buffoon, a fool
- Mr. Tickletext, his governor
- Jack, Sir Signall's man

=== Women ===
- Laura Lucretia, a young lady of quality, contracted to Julio, in love with Galliard, and sister to Octavio
- Marcella and Cornelia, sisters to Julio, and nieces to Morsini; they pass for courtesans by the names of Euphemia and Silvianetta
- Phillipa, their servant
- Sabina, confidant to Laura Lucretia

== Original Cast ==
- Henry Norris – Morsini
- John Crosby – Julio
- Thomas Gillow – Octavio and Crapine
- Anthony Leigh – Petro
- William Smith – Sir Harry Fillamour
- Thomas Betterton – Mr. Galliard
- James Nokes – Sir Signall Buffoon
- Cave Underhill – Mr. Tickletext and Jack
- Mary Slingsby – Laura Lucretia
- Elizabeth Currer – Marcella
- Elizabeth Barry – Cornelia
- Mrs. Norris – Phillipa
- Mrs. Seymour – Sabina

== Summary ==
The play centers around two virtuous sisters, Marcella and Cornelia. Marcella has been promised to Octavio for marriage, but has fallen in love with Sir Henry Fillamour. Cornelia is bound for the convent. They have run away to Rome together, posing as courtesans named Euphemia and Silvianetta, so that they may be free to control their own futures.

When Fillamour and Galliard arrive in Rome, they notice the beautiful Marcella and Cornelia disguised as the courtesans Euphemia and Silvianetta. Galliard is taken by Silvianetta's beauty, and Fillamour is struck by Euphemia's resemblance to Marcella. He becomes conflicted, desiring to stay constant in his love for Marcella, but unable to resist Euphemia.

Meanwhile, Laura Lucretia, the sister of Octavio (Marcella's betrothed), has fallen in love with Galliard. Knowing that he favors the courtesan named Silvianetta, Laura Lucretia disguises herself as Cornelia's alter ego so as to secure Galliard's affections. Having learned of Marcella's adoration for Fillamour, Octavio pledges revenge against him. To keep Fillamour safe, Marcella disguises herself as a pageboy and attempts to divert him from going to meet Euphemia at a place where Octavio and his men are lying in wait.

In a comedic scene, Fillamour, Galliard, Signall, and Tickletext all stumble about in the dark trying to reach Silvianetta and Euphemia, but instead find themselves in a battle with Octavio and his supporters. During the same night, Laura Lucretia, dressed as Silvianetta, receives an oath of marriage from a man she believes to be Galliard, but is actually Julio.

Once in the daylight, all parties confront each other and identities are revealed. Fillamour professes his love for Marcella, who agrees to marry him after Octavio renounces his claim. Galliard and Cornelia also become engaged. Julio, who had made an oath of marriage to “Silvianetta,” discovers he has actually sworn himself to his already bride-to-be, Laura Lucretia.

== Criticism ==
Recent critics have analysed the Behn's manipulation of commercially successful plays, giving them a twist from a woman's perspective.

== Production history ==
The play was not well received at the Dorset Garden but did move on to a staging at court in 1680. Samuel Johnson criticized the fact that Behn dedicated the printed version to the king's Protestant mistress. It seems there was never a second edition printed, and even the first was badly edited with errors and erratic line breaks. The Feign'd Curtizans might have seen a revival production in 1696. In any case, a 1716 production at Lincoln's Inn Fields is documented. Several further productions followed until 1717, after which the play no longer appears.

Synchronicity Performance Group performed the play at Emory University in the 1997/1998 season.
