= The Sullen Lovers =

1668 play

- Original language: English
- Written by: Thomas Shadwell
- Genre: Comedy

Premiere
- Date: 2 May 1668
- Place: Lincoln's Inn Fields Theatre, London

The Sullen Lovers; Or, The Impertinents is a 1668 comedy play by the English writer Thomas Shadwell, inspired by Molière's Les Fâcheux. It was staged by the Duke's Company at the Lincoln's Inn Fields Theatre in London. The cast included Henry Harris as Sir Positive At-All, James Nokes as Poet Ninny, William Smith as Standford and Edward Angel as Woodcock and Anne Shadwell as Emelia.

== Bibliography ==
- Howe, Elizabeth. The First English Actresses: Women and Drama, 1660-1700. Cambridge University Press, 1992.
- Nicoll, Allardyce. History of English Drama, 1660-1900: Volume 1, Restoration Drama, 1660-1700. Cambridge University Press, 1952.
- Van Lennep, W. The London Stage, 1660-1800: Volume One, 1660-1700. Southern Illinois University Press, 1960.
