= The Citizen Turned Gentleman =

1672 play

- Original language: English
- Written by: Edward Ravenscroft
- Based on: Le Bourgeois gentilhomme by Molière
- Genre: Comedy
- Setting: England

Premiere
- Date: 4 July 1672
- Place: Dorset Garden Theatre, London

The Citizen Turned Gentleman (also known as Mamamouchi: Or, The Citizen Turned Gentleman) is 1672 comedy play by the English writer Edward Ravenscroft. Staged at the Dorset Garden Theatre by the Duke's Company the original cast included James Nokes as Mr Jorden, Philip Cademan as Young Jorden, John Crosby as Mr Cleverwit, Cave Underhill as Sir Simon Softhead, Henry Harris as Trickmore, Samuel Sandford as Cureal, Edward Angel as Maistre Jaques, Mary Betterton as Lucia and Elinor Leigh as Betty Trickmore.

The play is an adaptation of Molière's 1670 comedy, Le Bourgeois gentilhomme.

== Plot ==
The story centers on Mr. Jorden, a prosperous but deeply naive London draper who is utterly obsessed with shedding his middle-class roots to become an aristocratic gentleman. To achieve this, he foolishly hires a small army of expensive, bickering tutors in music, dance, fencing, and philosophy. They happily drain his bank account while privately mocking his complete lack of rhythm, coordination, and intellect. Jorden’s desperate vanity makes him an easy target for a bankrupt courtier named Dorant, who extravagantly flatters the merchant to borrow massive sums of money. Dorant promises to use the cash to woo a wealthy widow on Jorden's behalf, but secretly pockets the money and courts the lady for himself.

The plot takes a farcical turn when Jorden’s daughter, Lucia, wants to marry Cleverwit, a witty young man of humble status. Because Jorden refuses to let his daughter marry anyone below the rank of nobility, Cleverwit and his servant launch a wild, low-budget hoax. Cleverwit disguises himself as the wealthy son of the Grand Signior of Turkey. He dazzles the starstruck Jorden by "ennobling" him in an absurd, entirely fake, grand backyard ceremony, complete with a chorus of chanting, fake Turkish paladins, bestowing upon the ecstatic merchant the completely fictional, nonsensical title of "Mamamouchi". Totally blinded by his ridiculous new "aristocratic" status, Jorden eagerly grants the fake Turkish prince his daughter’s hand in marriage, completely unaware that he has been swindled by his own family.

== Bibliography ==
- Van Lennep, W. The London Stage, 1660-1800: Volume One, 1660-1700. Southern Illinois University Press, 1960.
