= The Libertine (play) =

Play by Thomas Shadwell, published in 1676

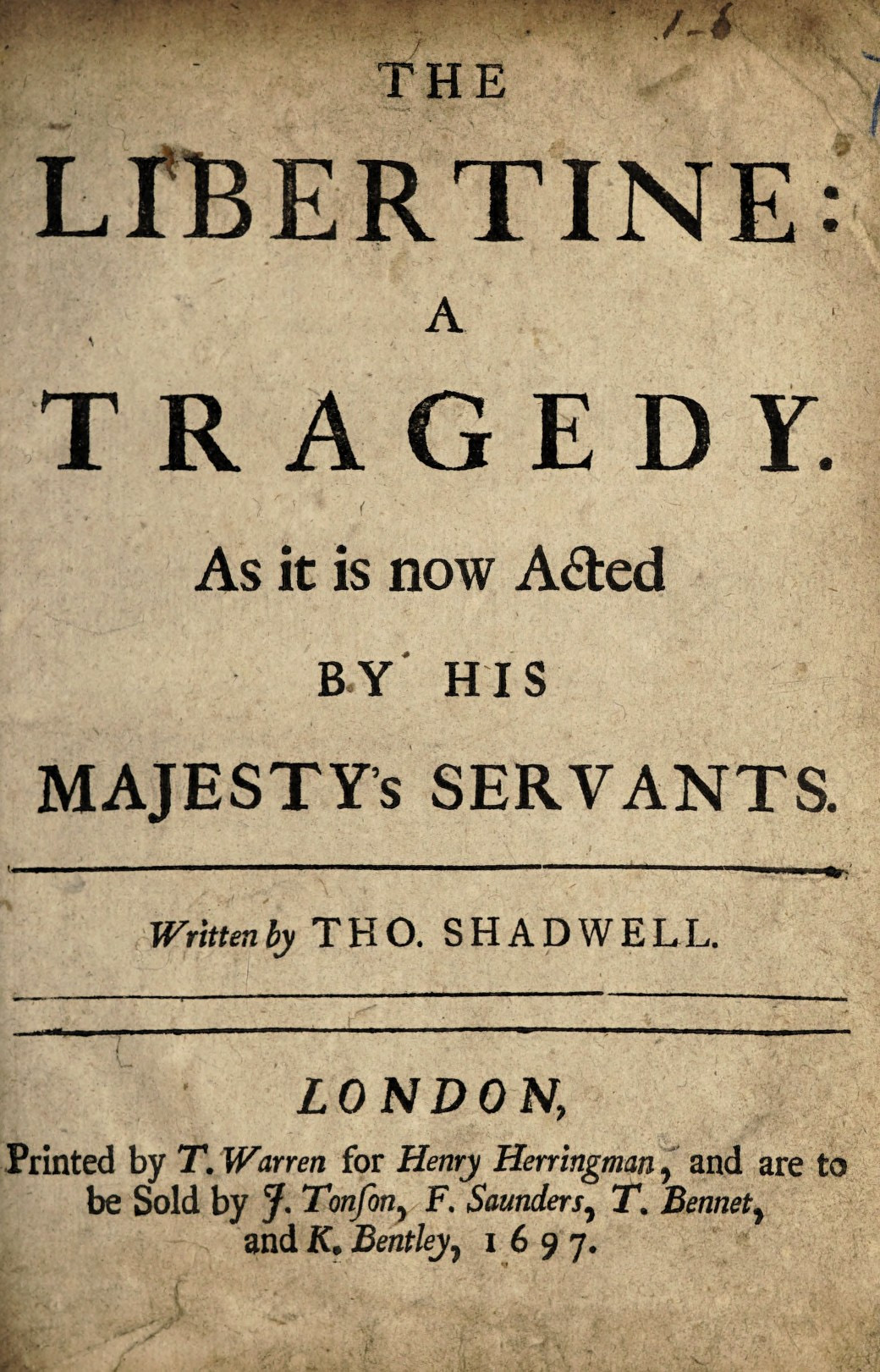
Title page of the 1697 edition

The Libertine is a play by Thomas Shadwell published in 1676. The play is an adaptation of the original plot of El burlador de Sevilla, written by Tirso de Molina, which follows the story of a horrid womanizer who plays with his life and others as he commits sins and "shapeshifts" into a devil-like man. Like most of the adaptations, The Libertine is a story of a mischievous man condemned to pay for the actions of his sins.

== Characters ==
Characters	
Don John	The Libertine, a fearless man guilty of all vice
Don Octavio	Maria's lover
Don Antonio and Don Lopez	Don John's two friends
Jacomo	Don John's Man
Leonora	Don John's mistress
Maria	Don Octavio's lover and Leonora's lady-in-waiting
Don Francisco	A gentleman
Clara and Flavia	Don Francisco's daughters

== The play ==
=== Prologue ===
The Libertine begins with a preface and prologue. Both address the contemporary public of the latter 1600s and therefore should be interpreted in that context. Such prefaces were often used as a means to "settle scores" between authors. Shadwell and John Dryden regularly referenced each other and were famous for their altercations. Shadwell's "infamous, coarse and vulgar censorship of a maker of verse" is a direct allusion to John Dryden and criticism of the writing in The Conquest of China attacks Elkanah Settle.

=== Act I ===
The first act of The Libertine opens with a philosophical discussion between Don John and his two lewd friends, Don Lopez and Don Antonio. Jacomo, Don John's valet, intervenes to reproach the trio with a list of their various misdeeds. Leonora, seduced by Don John, then enters and has come to ask Jacomo about his master's intentions. The valet destroys all her illusions concerning Don John, takes advantage of the situation to attempt her seduction, and gives her an appointment in order to prove to her how well-founded his accusations of Don John are.

In the meantime, Don John and his friends are recounting their latest amorous adventures, each lewder than the other, and Don John declares that he must presently carry through an intrigue. To this end, he kills his intended lover Maria's fiancé and enters her apartments in his place. Unmasked by Maria and her servant, he must also kill Maria's brother before making his escape.

=== Act II ===
At the beginning of Act II, Leonora comes to the rendezvous arranged by Jacomo who conceals her pending his master's arrival. Don John brags to his valet about his latest exploits, Leonora emerges in the middle of the conversation, outraged by what she has just heard. She implores Don John to honour the engagement that binds them, but he dismisses her without consideration. Then six women enter who all claim to be the legitimate wife of Don John. They argue about the promises of marriage that he has made, until the arrival of Don Lopez and Don Antonio. Don John then leaves them to his friends stating that he never seduces the same woman twice. One of them kills herself to escape this collective rape. Don John forces Jacomo to remove the corpse and orders him to bring back the first woman that he meets in the street in order for him to join his friends in their debauchery. Jacomo brings back a horrible old woman. In the meantime, Maria dressed as a man and accompanied by her maid, attacks Don John whom she intends to kill to avenge the murders committed. She fails and in the confrontation, her maid meets her death. Don John and his friends decide to escape by sea and Jacomo, increasingly afraid at the turn of events, implores them in vain to leave him behind. The ghost of Don John's father then appears and warns him, but he laughs at its threats.

=== Act III ===
In Act III, Don John, his valet and his two friends face a storm at sea. With their ship on fire, they escape in a boat having beaten off the sailors who also tried to come aboard. The trio is stranded on a beach, and a hermit comes to their aid. As a mark of their gratitude, they ask him to provide them with a whore. Frightened, he tries in vain to convert them. Then they go to the home of Don Francisco, a gentleman living close by. Jacomo, also rescued by the hermit, takes the same direction, as well as Leonora and Maria (still dressed as a man) who have joined forces to find Don John. At Don Francisco's, his two daughters Clara and Flavia bemoan the fate that awaits them, as the following day they must marry two men chosen by their father. When Don John meets the two girls, he promises marriage to them both. Leonora and Maria also arrive. Leonora, who is still in love with Don John, tries one last time to convince him, but he poisons her as his final answer. In the meantime, Maria has fought with Don John's two acolytes.

=== Act IV ===
In Act IV, Maria presents herself at Don Francisco's house to accuse Don John of Leonora's murder. The confusion produced by this declaration is added to with the arrival of the two daughters Clara and Flavia who announce their imminent marriage to Don John. A fight starts between the lewd trio, the two future husbands, Don Francisco and Maria. The latter two are killed, the two fiancés are wounded, and the two girls run away, deciding to retire to a convent to expiate their sins. Still accompanied by Jacomo the valet, Don John and his friends also escape and kidnap some shepherdesses after battling with the shepherds. On their way, they find the statue of the Commander murdered by Don John who forces his valet to invite it to dine. The statue accepts, attends the dinner as a ghost and returns the invitation to the foursome.

=== Act V ===
In Act V, the three associates decide to set fire to a convent to force the nuns to leave the building and thus attempt their rape. In passing, Don John tries to abduct Clara and Flavia who in the meantime had taken refuge in religious life. Several shepherds and guards attempt to intervene and are killed. They finally go to the Commander's tomb, where he awaits them with the assembled ghosts of all the people they have murdered. Confronted by the trio's refusal to repent, the Commander sends them all to Hell. Jacomo remains alone on stage to address the public.

== History of The Libertine ==
It is said that Don John was based on a Spanish character by the name of Don Juan. Don Juan is a living legend in European literature, whose character has been adapted and manipulated to fit the culture in which it is being presented. This character is known to be a womanizer, and of great wealth and practice, much like the protagonist presented in The Libertine (English version). However, in the Spanish and original version of this story, Don Juan is seen as the devil incarnate and a man who, no matter how vile he is or desires to be, has to "pay his own debts" for his sins. This plot transpired to inspire many other writers, including Thomas Shadwell who adapted it for his own work. A series of murders, acts of incest, adultery, and acts against the Catholic Church described in Shadwell's play were included with the purpose of causing fear of hell and God's punishment in readers. The plots of the works by various authors who have adapted the character of Don Juan leads to some sort of insanity, death or some conundrum that explicitly demonstrates acts of defiance against God and its consequences.

== Reaction ==
The illustration of sins in the play provoked fear of God in its audiences. When writing his play, Shadwell's intention was to cause fear of sin in his readers and to influence them to act according to the Church or, rather, religion. In consequence, many audiences, in the various adaptations around the country and years, were persuaded and localized their fear of sin and decided to follow the path of God.
