= The False Count =

1681 play

- Original language: English
- Written by: Aphra Behn
- Genre: Comedy

Premiere
- Date: November 1681
- Place: Dorset Garden Theatre, London

The False Count, Or, A New Way to play An Old Game is a comedic play written by Aphra Behn, first performed in 1681 and published in 1682. It was staged by the Duke's Company at the Dorset Garden Theatre in London. The cast included William Smith as Don Carlos, James Nokes as Francisco, John Freeman as Sebastian, John Wiltshire as Antonio, George Bright as Baltazer, Cave Underhill as Guzman, Anthony Leigh as Guilion, Elizabeth Currer as Isabella and Margaret Osborne as Jacinta.

== Plot ==
Julia is in love with Don Carlos, the Governor of Cadiz. The couple have secretly exchanged private vows of love, but Julia's father then coerces her into marrying Don Francisco, an old Englishman who now lives in Spain.

Francisco proves to be a jealous and oppressive husband. After they are taken prisoner by supposed corsairs, the terrified Francisco relinquishes Julia to their captor, a 'Turkish Sultan'. The Sultan is actually Carlos in disguise, and he and Julia are able to consummate their relationship. Their trick is discovered once Julia's father arrives at the villa. Carlos announces to the group that he and Julia did not commit adultery, because their private vows meant that they were already married in the eyes of God. Francisco is therefore obliged to release Julia from their marriage.

In a sub-plot, Francisco's haughty daughter Isabella is supposed to marry Antonio (a friend of Carlos). She is introduced to Guiliom, a chimney-sweep who is masquerading as a nobleman (the 'false count' of the title). Antonio is then free to marry Clara (Julia's sister), with whom he is actually in love.

== Reception ==
Anita Pacheco notes that 'what is immediately striking about The False Count in generic terms are the ways in which it blurs the distinctions between the camps of the cuckolding parties'. The hero's victory comes at the price of becoming a cuckold himself: in order to assert his legal rights to Julia, Carlos must concede that Francisco has cuckolded him.
