= The London Cuckolds =

1681 play

- Original language: English
- Written by: Edward Ravenscroft
- Genre: Restoration Comedy

Premiere
- Date: 22 December 1681
- Place: Dorset Garden Theatre, London

The London Cuckolds is a 1681 comedy play by the English writer Edward Ravenscroft.

It was performed at the Dorset Garden Theatre by the Duke's Company. The original cast included Cave Underhill as Wiseacre, James Nokes as Doodle, Joseph Williams as Townly, John Wiltshire as Loveday, William Smith as Ramble, Anthony Leigh as Dashwell, John Richards as Tom, Elizabeth Currer as Eugenia, Elizabeth Barry as Arabella, Elinor Leigh as Engine and Margaret Osborne as Jane.

== Bibliography ==
- Van Lennep, W. The London Stage, 1660-1800: Volume One, 1660-1700. Southern Illinois University Press, 1960.
