= Fatal Love =

Fatal Love may refer to:

- Fatal Love (play), a 1680 tragedy by the English writer Elkanah Settle
- Fatal Love, an alternative name of the 1992 television movie Something to Live for: The Alison Gertz Story
- Fatal Love (1988 film), a Hong Kong film directed by Leong Po-Chih
- Fatal Love (1993 film), a Hong Kong Category III film, see List of Hong Kong Category III films
- Fatal Love (album), an album by Monsta X
