= John Josselyn =

English traveller to New England

John Josselyn (fl. 1638 – 1675) was a seventeenth-century English traveller to New England who wrote with credulity about what he saw and heard during his sojourn there before returning to England. Yet his books give some of the earliest and most complete information on New England flora and fauna in colonial times, and his outlook was later praised by Henry Thoreau, among others. Little is known about his life.

Josselyn's years of birth and death are not known, but he was born early in the seventeenth century to Sir Thomas Josselyn of Kent. He first visited New England in July 1638 when he presented his respects to Governor John Winthrop and to the Rev. John Cotton, to whom he delivered from Francis Quarles a translation of several psalms into English. He stayed in New England for 15 months, then visited again 24 years later, in 1663. Returning to England in 1671, Josselyn published New England's Rarities, discovered in Birds, Beasts, Fishes, Serpents, and Plants of that Country (the book included a picture of Boston in 1663).

The evidence gleaned from New England Rarities and An Account of Two Voyages indicates he was well-educated and may have been trained as a surgeon and physician. "His observations on the state of medicine have been highly valued", according to the University of Delaware Library.

== Critical evaluation ==
Josselyn was "a writer of almost incredible credulity", according to the anthology Colonial Prose and Poetry: The Beginnings of Americanism 1650–1710. "He is frank in criticism, somewhat affected in style. His interest is more in the curiosities of nature than in questions of religious or social polity. His credulity rises almost to genius, as when he tells us that the Indians disputed "in perfect hexameter verse".

== Works ==
- 1671: New England's Rarities, discovered in Birds, Beasts, Fishes, Serpents, and Plants of that Country, reprinted with notes by Edward Tuckerman in 1865.
- 1674: An Account of two Voyages to New England, London: Printed for Giles Widdows. "[H]is work is among the earliest on the natural history of the region," according to the University of Delaware Library. "An extensive and quite accurate catalog of the fauna and flora of the region makes up much of the text." A critical edition edited by Paul J. Lindholdt was published in 1988 by the University Press of New England, ISBN 0-87451-543-2. The 1865 version edited by William Veazie is available at for free at Project Gutenberg.
- The Most Remarkable Passages from the First Discovery of the Continent of America to 1673, reprinted by Edward Tuckerman in 1865 along with New England's Rarities (see above)
