= Madam Fickle =

1676 play

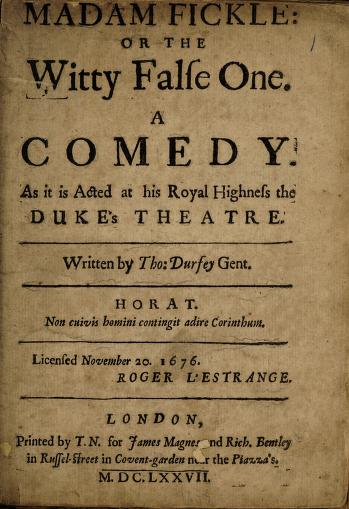
- Original language: English
- Written by: Thomas D'Urfey
- Genre: Restoration Comedy

Premiere
- Date: 4 November 1676
- Place: Dorset Garden Theatre, London

Madam Fickle; Or, The Witty False One is a 1676 comedy play by the English writer Thomas D'Urfey. It was first staged at the Dorset Garden Theatre by the Duke's Company.

The original cast included Thomas Betterton as Lord Bellamore, William Smith as Manley, Samuel Sandford as Sir Arthur Oldlove, Matthew Medbourne as Captain Tilbury, Anthony Leigh as Zechiel, James Nokes as Toby, Cave Underhill as Old Jollyman, Thomas Jevon as Harry, John Richards as Flaile, Henry Norris as Dorrel, Mary Lee as Madam Fickle, Elizabeth Barry as Constantia and Anne Shadwell as Arbella. The published version of the play was dedicated to the Duke of Ormonde.

== Bibliography ==
- Canfield, J. Douglas. Tricksters and Estates: On the Ideology of Restoration Comedy. University Press of Kentucky, 2014.
- Van Lennep, W. The London Stage, 1660-1800: Volume One, 1660-1700. Southern Illinois University Press, 1960.
