= John Shadwell (physician) =

English physician (1671–1747)

- Born: 1671; Middlesex
- Died: 4 January 1747 (aged 75–76)
- Occupation: Physician

Sir John Shadwell (1671 – 4 January 1747) was an English physician.

== Biography ==
Shadwell was the son of Thomas Shadwell and Anne, daughter of Thomas Gibbs of Norwich. He was born in Middlesex, probably at Chelsea, in 1671. On 15 May 1685 he matriculated at Oxford from University College, whence he migrated to All Souls' College. He graduated B.A. on 1 June 1689 (3 November 1688, according to the register at All Souls' College), M.A. on 26 April 1693, M.B. on 19 April 1697, and M.D. on 5 June 1700. As physician in ordinary to Queen Anne he was admitted a fellow of the College of Physicians on 22 December 1712. On 30 November 1701 he was elected a fellow of the Royal Society, and he was admitted on 3 Dec. He read one paper before the society, an ‘Account of an Extraordinary Skeleton’ (Philosophical Transactions, 1741, xli. 820). He was appointed physician-extraordinary to Queen Anne on 9 November 1709, and on 9 February 1712 was sworn one of the physicians in ordinary, in the room of Dr. Martin Lister being succeeded in his former office by Dr. Hans Sloane. The accounts of the queen's illness in December 1713–14 in Abel Boyer's ‘History of the Reign of Queen Anne’ are derived from Shadwell's letters to the Duke and Duchess of Shrewsbury. Boyer recorded Shadwell's opinion that the queen died of ‘gouty humour translating itself upon the brain.’ He continued to be physician in ordinary to George I and George II, and was knighted on 12 June 1715. He long resided in Windmill Street, and in 1735 withdrew from practice and retired to France, where he remained until 1740. He died at Windmill Street on 4 January 1747. He was buried on 8 January at Bath Abbey, where there is a tomb with an elaborate epitaph to his memory.

Sir John Shadwell was twice married; by his first wife, who died on 14 April 1722, he had issued one son and three daughters. He married, secondly, Ann Binns, at Somerset House chapel, on 12 March 1725; and on 29 June 1731 he made his will in her favour. Lady Shadwell survived until 1777.
