= Samuel Bownas =

Samuel Bownas (1676–1753) was a Quaker travelling minister, and writer. He lived in the Lancaster and Dover areas of England. His book A Description of the Qualifications Necessary to a Gospel Minister is used to inform Quaker ministry to this day.

== Childhood ==
Samuel Bownas was born in 1676, to Quaker parents, although his father died when he was a month old. His father had been a Friend during the time of Quaker persecution, with meetings of the Friends having been held in his house. Bownas was admitted as a member of Great Strickland (Westmorland) Monthly Meeting as a baby. During his childhood he did not have a great taste for Quakerism or religion at all, although his mother would read accounts of his father's sufferings to him in the evenings, and he went with his mother to meeting and to visit Friends imprisoned in Appleby. He was apprenticed to his uncle as a blacksmith, at the age of 13.

== Religious conversion ==
In 1696, his life was changed. At this time he was apprenticed to Samuel Parrott, a Friend from Briggflatts meeting in Sedbergh. Attending meeting for worship, another Friend, Anne Wilson rose in worship and accused him of being no better for his attendance of meeting for worship, and that would prove perilous for him "in the end". Afterwards he felt called to preach and read the Bible with greater ease. His famous A Description of the Qualifications Necessary to a Gospel Minister was first printed in 1750.

Having first journeyed to Scotland, he sailed for America aboard the Josiah, John Sowden, master. He landed two months later in Potuxant River, Maryland about 29 May 1702, and continued his work.

Bownas died at Bridport, Dorset on 2 April 1753.
