= The Careless Lovers =

1673 play

- Original language: English
- Written by: Edward Ravenscroft
- Genre: Restoration Comedy

Premiere
- Date: 12 March 1673
- Place: Dorset Garden Theatre, London

The Careless Lovers is a 1673 comedy play by the English writer Edward Ravenscroft. Staged at the Dorset Garden Theatre by the Duke's Company the original cast included Henry Norris as Mr Machworth, Philip Cademan as Mr Lovell, William Smith as Mr Careless, Edward Angel as De Boastado, Margaret Osborne as Mrs Clappam, Elizabeth Norris as Mrs Breedwell, and Elinor Leigh as Beatrice.

== Plot ==
The Careless Lovers follows the tyrannical London Alderman Mr. Muchworth, who is determined to block his daughter Jacinta from marrying her true love, Lovell. Instead, he plans to force her into a highly profitable arranged marriage with Lord De Boastado, an insufferably pompous and easily fooled nobleman. Muchworth is also tasked with managing his cynical, fiercely independent niece, Hillaria. Rather than helping her cousin, Hillaria is locked in a savage, rapid-fire war of wits with a fellow libertine named Careless; both loudly despise the traditional concept of marriage and spend their time trading insults.

To stop the forced wedding, Jacinta, Lovell, and their highly proactive servants launch a series of chaotic, retaliatory scams to utterly ruin Lord De Boastado’s reputation. In the play's most famous farcical highlight, they hire two heavily pregnant tavern wenches to ambush De Boastado in public. The women scream and aggressively claim that the fop is the father of their unborn children, thoroughly embarrassing him in front of the Alderman. Meanwhile, the clever maidservant Beatrice decides to look out for her own financial future; she puts on an elaborate aristocratic disguise, seduces the clueless De Boastado, and successfully tricks him into legally marrying her instead of Jacinta.

With De Boastado accidentally married to a maid and his social ambitions completely shattered, Muchworth has no choice but to capitulate and allow Jacinta and Lovell to wed. The final comedic victory belongs to the sub-plot: realizing they are intellectual and rakish equals, Careless and Hillaria finally agree to marry. However, they do so with a radically subversive twist, explicitly vowing that they will completely disregard traditional marital fidelity and remain "careless lovers" who are free to sleep with other people

== Bibliography ==
- Van Lennep, W. The London Stage, 1660-1800: Volume One, 1660-1700. Southern Illinois University Press, 1960.
