= Samuel Pordage =

Samuel Pordage (1633 – c. 1691) was a 17th-century English poet. He is best known by his Azaria and Hushai (1682), a reply to John Dryden's Absalom and Achitophel.

== Life ==
Samuel was the eldest son of John Pordage, a clergyman from Bradfield in Berkshire, who married the widow, Mary Pordage (born Lane) on 17 January 1633. Samuel baptised at St Dionis Backchurch, London, on 29 December 1633. He was educated at Merchant Taylors' School from 1644, and studied law at Lincoln's Inn. At the trial of his father ten years later he appears to have been one of the witnesses. In his title-pages he described himself as ‘of Lincoln's Inn’ and ‘a student of physick.’ He was at one time chief steward to Philip Herbert, 5th Earl of Pembroke.

Roger L'Estrange attacked Pordage in the ‘Observator’ for 5 April 1682 on account of ‘A brief History of all the Papists' bloudy Persecutions,’ calling him ‘limping Pordage, a son of the famous Familist about Reading and the author of several libels,’ one against L'Estrange. Dryden, in the second part of ‘Absalom and Achitophel,’ published in November, described Pordage as

Lame Mephibosheth, the wizard's son.

== Works ==
He made various translations, wrote poems, and laid claim to two tragedies, Herod and Mariamne (1673), and The Siege of Babylon (1678), and a romance, Eliana.

While living with his father at the parsonage of Bradfield in 1660 he published a translation from Seneca the Younger, with notes, called ‘Troades Englished.’ About the same time he published ‘Poems upon Several Occasions, by S. P., gent.,’ a little volume which included panegyrics on Charles II and General George Monck, but which consisted for the most part of poems in the style of Robert Herrick.

In 1661 a volume appeared called ‘Mundorum Explicatio, or the explanation of an Hieroglyphical Figure. … Being a Sacred Poem, written by S. P., Armig.’ This book, which was reissued in 1663, is attributed to Samuel Pordage, though it has been suggested that the real author was Pordage's father, a professed follower of Jacob Boehme. White Kennett, writing in 1728, attributed the work to Samuel.

In 1661 Samuel Pordage published a pamphlet, ‘Heroick Stanzas on his Maiesties Coronation.’ In 1673 his Herod and Mariamne a tragedy, was acted at the Duke's Theatre, and was published anonymously. Elkanah Settle signed the dedication to the Duchess of Albemarle. The plot was borrowed from Josephus and the romance of ‘Cleopatra.’ In 1678 appeared ‘The Siege of Babylon, by Samuel Pordage of Lincoln's Inn, Esq., author of the tragedy of “Herod and Mariamne.”’ This play had been licensed by Roger L'Estrange on 2 November 1677, and acted at the Duke's Theatre not long after the production at the Theatre Royal of Nathaniel Lee's ‘Rival Queens;’ and Statira and Roxana, the ‘rival queens,’ were principal characters in Pordage's rhymed tragedy. The story is based upon ‘Cassandra’ and other romances of the day.

Pordage brought out in 1679 the sixth edition of John Reynolds's ‘Triumphs of God's Revenge against the sin of Murther;’ he prefixed to it a dedication to the Earl of Shaftesbury. In 1681, at the time when the Popish Plot scare was ebbing out, he wrote a single folio sheet, ‘A new Apparition of Sir Edmundbury Godfrey's Ghost to the E. of D—— in the Tower;’ the printer was obliged to make a public apology for the reflections on the Earl of Danby which it contained. Between 1681 and 1684 he issued ‘The Remaining Medical Works of … Dr. Thomas Willis … Englished by S. P., Esq.’ There is a general dedication to Sir Theophilus Biddulph, signed by Pordage; and verses ‘On the author's Medico-philosophical Discourses’ precede the first part.

Dryden's ‘Absalom and Achitophel’ appeared in November 1681, and among the answers to it was Pordage's ‘Azaria and Hushai, a Poem,’ 1682. In this piece Azaria was the Duke of Monmouth, Amazia the king, Hushai Shaftesbury, and Shimei Dryden. Some lines were devoted to L'Estrange, who was called Bibbai. On 15 March 1682 Dryden brought out ‘The Medal, a Satire against Sedition,’ an attack on Shaftesbury, and on 31 March Pordage published ‘The Medal revers'd, a Satyre against Persecution,’ with an epistle, addressed, in imitation of Dryden, to his enemies, the Tories. Pordage said he did not believe that the authors of ‘Absalom and Achitophel’ and ‘The Medal’ were the same, yet, as they desired to be thought so, each must bear the reproaches of the other.

In May John Oldham, in his ‘Imitation of the Third Satire of Juvenal,’ had ridiculed Pordage, and in another ‘Satire’ mentioned Pordage among the authors who had ‘grown contemptible, and slighted since.’ Besides the pieces already mentioned, Pordage is stated to have written a romance called ‘Eliana.’
