= Thomas Tomkinson =

English writer (1631–1710)

Thomas Tomkinson (1631–1710) was an English Muggletonian writer born at Ilam, near Dovedale, in Staffordshire. His parents, Richard and Ann, farmed at Sladehouse and Thomas took over the business as a yeoman farmer even while his father was alive. His faith was initially Presbyterian but in 1661 he read a book by Laurence Clarkson (presumably The Lost Sheep Found) and became attracted to Muggletonianism. Earlier, in February 1652, he had had a revelatory experience similar to the one Lodowicke Muggleton reported in 1650 but without any experience of the direct voice of God which had come to John Reeve and which was the foundation experience of Muggletonianism. Since John Reeve died in 1658, these dates mean that Tomkinson was one of the first prominent Muggletonian personalities not to have known Reeve personally.

== Life ==
Tomkinson visited London, where he met Lodowicke Muggleton on Mayday 1662. He returned to Staffordshire and married, Ann, shortly afterwards. He converted a sizeable number of family, friends and neighbours to the new faith, enough to make himself a nuisance to the parish authorities. He said he managed to keep the peace only "through a little money and friendship". On 9 December 1664 he was blessed by Lodowicke Muggleton. In 1674 he found himself in serious trouble on account of his beliefs and, to evade arrest, contemplated emigrating to the New England Colonies. He was talked out of it by Muggleton.

Around 1680 he moved permanently to London. It is unclear how he made his living. Part of the time he followed Muggleton's trade of tailoring but he also had plans to wholesale cheese and butter in the capital. He still signed his writings, however, as from Sladehouse. On 10 July 1684, Thomas and Ann's daughter, Anne, was blessed by Lodowicke Muggleton.

Lodowicke Muggleton died in 1698 and Tomkinson is credited by Professor William M. Lamont as "the man who prevented the religion from imploding after Muggleton's death" which is what Muggleton himself thought would happen. He is thus crucial to how a small sect survived. Tomkinson was Muggleton's literary executor, preparing and editing Muggleton's autobiographical "Acts of the Witnesses" leaving out some of the more contested astronomical assertions. Tomkinson is quite open in his introduction as to the deletions he made.

Thomas Tomkinson died in London in 1710 and was succeeded as unofficial leader of the Muggletonians by Arden Bonell (? – 1746)

== Ideas ==
Tomkinson's conversion experience had been a difficult one. "What a great deal of pain to please the unsatisfied fancy of one particular man," Muggleton had grumbled. Tomkinson had been attracted to Muggletonianism by the radical humanity of their God. Every Muggletonian agreed God was the man Christ Jesus; necessarily and sufficiently. One of Tomkinson's subsequent books was called None but Christ. But it mattered intensely to him that Christ had not known of his divinity while on Earth, else his humanity was inauthentic. John Reeve had inclined to think Christ had awareness, at least at some stage. But, "Mr Clarkson in his Wonder of Wonders said he did not know himself to be the only God." Muggleton affected sagely indifference. For Tomkinson, Christ had lived, died and lain in a grave for three days entirely as a man. By what power, then, did this man ascend to heaven? There has to be an answer else the crucifixion is the final death of God: indeed, God's suicide. The standard Muggletonian reply is that during Christ's sojourn on Earth, the affairs of heaven were managed by Elijah (perhaps in partnership with Moses and Enoch). Elijah had temporary control of God's prerogative power, easily adequate to a resurrection and glorious return. Such a view seems to fit nicely with the transfiguration story. It also explains the crowd at the crucifixion crying out, "Behold, he calleth Elias." But the monotheism of the whole enterprise is dangerously compromised. On one hand, there is a God in the form of the man Christ Jesus. On the other hand, there is a man Elijah, directly translated to heaven without death, capable of exercising God's full prerogative power. Where remains the dividing line between creator and created?

Tomkinson's most original contribution to Muggletonian belief was to adapt the theory of 'the seed of the serpent and the seed of the woman', which John Reeve had expounded in A Divine Looking-Glass, to produce a doctrine of predestination that avoided the perceived pessimism of Calvin's model. Muggletonians felt Calvin portrayed God as a kind of capricious tyrant because Calvinism allowed only for 'one seed' which rendered the whole of humanity abject. Tomkinson also toned down Muggleton's implacable hostility to reason, accepting that reason had its uses in everyday life but was no substitute for faith. The term 'sober reason' was coined to imply reason subordinated to faith.

Tomkinson's most lasting contribution may have been to stress that there was no dividing line between the ideas of Lodowicke Muggleton and those of John Reeve. This topic was a source of splits and dissent amongst Muggletonians, some believing that Muggleton, alone, had insisted that God took no immediate notice of everyday human activities.

Tomkinson is perhaps the first Muggletonian intellectual. At least, one of the first influenced by the wider history of ideas. His writings are profusely illustrated by references to classical authors, church fathers, and western philosophers. Muggleton himself was probably well-read but made a point of relying on a mix of scriptural quotation and plain common-sense, which he felt to be the key to avoiding the opposing traps of scriptural literalism and the imaginings of reason.

== "A Practical Discourse upon the General Epistle by Jude" ==
Tomkinson's most important work from the sect's perspective was "A Practical Discourse upon the General Epistle by Jude". This was probably the last book Tomkinson wrote and he did so at the request of William Hall, a Derbyshire Muggletonian. Although only a short work of 25 verses, the Epistle of Jude was of disproportionate significance to Muggletonians. Its darkly poetic language seemed to give scriptural support to important Muggletonian ideas.

- The writer of Jude knows and esteems the Book of Enoch even though this work was lost in Tomkinson's day. The subsequent rediscovery in Western Europe of Enoch did much to bolster the Muggletonian view that they were on the right track. Since Jude and Revelation are the two concluding books of the New Testament, they seemed to point ahead to a Third Commission and to a Muggletonian future. According to modern exegesis, verses 4, 9, 10, 11, 13, 16 and 21 of Jude draw upon the book of Enoch whilst verse 6 can be derived from nowhere else and verses 14 and 15 give an openly acknowledged quote from it. What was generally important about Enoch was that he was the seventh from Adam (considered an auspiciously holy number), that he walked with God, and that he was translated directly from life on earth to heaven. What is important in the specific context of Jude is that Enoch is sufficient prophet of the reprobates' doom because, unusually, Enoch claimed to be a prophet of future times, not of his own. He alone, it was said, knew the secrets of time, whereas the rest of us know nothing.
- Jude incorporates, at verse 12, the concept of the 'second death'.
- Jude propagates the notion that a pre-existent Christ can be seen at work in the Old Testament. Christ is more than simply foretold. One ancient rendering of Jude uses the term 'the God Christ' and elsewhere the expression 'our only Master and Lord, Jesus Christ' is used. This is exactly what Muggletonians wanted to read.
- Jude's expression in verse 4 about men "who were long ago marked out for condemnation" is highly compatible with the doctrine of the two seeds.
- What is important about Cain, in Jude's interpretation is not so much his slaying his brother, but that this is a specific instance of his being "a child of the Evil One." which is congruent to Muggletonian belief.
- Jude disparages those false prophets who rely upon visions to bolster their opinions. No view could be more Muggletonian than this.
- Jude defends the reputation of the angels against those who deride them as cohorts of a demiurge.
- Jude advances the role of the prophet as the proper channel to expound God's will to people who should not rely upon their own lights and fancies in these matters.

Tomkinson uses his own book to promote a doctrine of election. He attacks, on one hand, the possibility of universal grace and, on the other, the belief that one can be saved by one's own efforts. He argues that people who hold to these views end up presuming to judge God by human standards. Besides, he suspects that those driven to deny election are motivated by fears for their own status. Only faith saves. "The world's faith is grounded upon tradition." God gave faith only once in the age of innocence. "There is no new faith given but the old awakened."

Those who die in faith do so with the assurance that, after the sleep of the grave, they will enjoy resurrection in both body and soul, in a new glorified condition. Those who lack this assurance, die in fear that their lot will be 'a second death'. We know this because Enoch taught it.

Using Jude's language, he likens the preachers of the established churches to wandering stars. They "shall always be learning but never come to the knowledge of the truth".

What about those who, in the time of the Third Commission, do not accept that faith but who, nevertheless, try to live lives of innocency? Will they be saved? Tomkinson thinks not. Their sincerity is matched by their spiritual ineffectualness because they cannot let go the apparent security and worldly attractions of reason. Ultimately, the seed of reason triumphs over the seed of faith in them and they go down. And to what a shuddering fate! At the end of time, those left behind on this abandoned earth "in which darkness they shall hear one another's doleful cries and cursed blasphemies, but shall never see one another's dreadful faces; neither can they stir from the place of their resurrection having bodies as heavy as lead and as black as pitch." Thus, then and now, hell is an accusing conscience.

== "The Muggletonian Principles Prevailing" ==
Only two of Tomkinson's books were printed during his lifetime. One, "The Muggletonian Principles Prevailing", printed 1695, is a reply to Dr John Williams' anonymous pamphlet called "A true representation of the absurd and mischievous principles of the sect called Muggletonians" (1694). It is interesting Dr Williams felt the Muggletonians worthy of notice. He makes individual, scriptural objections rather than a sustained critique. Most of the points had already been raked over in the disputes between Muggleton and the Quakers, so Tomkinson follows Muggleton's lead in the main.

Dr Williams has most success with the Book of Revelation. He wants to know why John Reeve says one reprobate angel fell when scripture says many such angels fell. This matters: it is central to Muggletonianism that one angel was cast from heaven to Earth to impregnate Eve (and to perish in the process) thus causing Cain to be the first offspring of the 'seed of the serpent' and for the perpetuation of evil to take place on Earth. However, Revelation 12:9 says, "that old serpent called the Devil, and Satan, which deceiveth the whole world: he was cast out into the earth and his angels were cast out with him". Tomkinson simply denies any 'rebellion in heaven' as described in Revelation 12:7 Such angels, he says, are merely Cain's offspring on this earth. But Tomkinson cannot summon the insouciance one might have expected Muggleton to have wielded at this point. For Muggleton, Williams would have been a misguided 'literalist' who, besotted with reason, failed to read Revelation in the manner appropriate to the last days.

However, Dr Williams could have driven his point about Revelation a lot further. Professor Lamont shows that neither Reeve nor Muggleton ever really got to grips with the question of how they knew they were the Two Witnesses of Revelation 11:3. God, when he spoke to Reeve, did not tell him so. The best Muggleton could do was to say that he and Reeve had defeated John Robins, that Robins was clearly the anti-Christ and that it was the job of the Witnesses to destroy the anti-Christ. Thus, Reeve and Muggleton must be the Two Witnesses.

Perhaps inevitably, Dr Williams questions the Muggletonians' professed power to curse and to bless. Here, Tomkinson strikes out on his own saying that this is none other than the gospel power to bind and to loose. Muggleton might have put the emphasis differently – with one eye on the legal code. Muggleton had never been tried in court for cursing even though The Blasphemy Act 1650 had criminalised it. But Muggleton knew there never was any law against simply saying a man is damned. So, Muggletonians pronounced sentence upon reprobates whose behaviour clearly showed the seed of the serpent at work within them. It was this seed within which caused their damnation. The sentence was merely stating the obvious.

== "A System of Religion" ==
This book has seven topics

- Christ, the one God
- The nature of the Trinity
- The Devil is nowhere to be found but in man
- Of the soul's dying with the body to await resurrection
- The two seeds and how to know which predominates
- Predestination
- Resurrection of the saints

The anonymous preface, presumably from 1729, says that Thomas Tomkinson's aim is to show the Muggletonian faith to be systematic and in accord with philosophical empiricism. His target is atheism, not other Christians. He says he will employ "mere faith" and the plain-sense meaning of scripture (which the 'atheistic enthusiast' is unlikely to accept anyway) scorning to employ reason "though it would make for his purpose." The modern reader may be disappointed that Tomkinson never engages with the arguments of Thomas Hobbes but sticks to preaching to the converted.

His first two topics, Christ the one God, and The Nature of the Trinity, can be taken together. Tomkinson starts from the monotheism of the Holy One of Israel who will not give his glory to another. Only that way can God derive his perfection from himself. Without that, what sort of God do we have? Meaningful unity of body and spirit is only possible if spirits cannot depart from bodily form. Tomkinson argues that God cannot be an infinite spirit else we would all have something of that spirit within us and there would not "remain an everlasting distinction between the changeable creature and the unchangeable Creator."

Humans can only describe things in terms derived from their own experience. It would make no sense to ask 'what was before God?' because our experience is a total blank. God has purposes of which we clearly know nothing so, in addition to his gracious side turned towards us, there are other sides which sometimes appear wrathful. To say God is father, son and holy ghost is in the same style as saying a human being is body, soul and spirit "united and knit together". God is not just a trinity but a whole world within himself: a Kingdom or a City and in everything an internal harmony. We, too, on this earth should cherish inner harmony as a foretaste of the paradise which will follow resurrection. God's word is a power and works like a "glorious wheel, that moved him to form living creatures to appear in his sight."

Or, as Tomkinson neatly summarises it, "He that was the seedsman became seed himself."

On his third topic, "The Devil is not a spirit in the air but a lying lustful spirit in the heart" which is well described by the scriptural phrase: 'hardening of the heart'. So, people cannot slough off responsibility for their own sins onto an external tempter. "I tell thee thy sins are begot by thine own intention, hatched in thine own heart, and acted by thine own will; so that thou weavest the web of thine own woe."

The fourth and seventh topics, Resurrection and the Soul, can be taken together.

Adam's living soul was, in a single essence, the breath of God and the dust of the earth. It is because a soul is always with a body that it is capable of sin. "If you say evil comes by imitation, try it, lock up a child from evil company and see if the seed of its own evil lust and appetites will not bud forth and produce evil." God does not attend the begetting of each new child. Procreation does its own work.

Every person will die the first death of mortality but it is obedience to sin which causes the second, eternal death. Thus "every sin is not unto death" meaning the second death.

On the first death, the saints do not go to heaven but sleep with the fathers in the earth. Lazarus was not called back from heaven but from the grave. In Tomkinson's view it is the false doctrine of the soul leaving the body at death to migrate straight to heaven which is the cause of much foolish martyrdom and suicide. Such false doctrine is zealously promoted by rulers whose self-interest lies in their citizens and soldiers killing and being killed for glory. Tomkinson believes this stems from the pagan notion of Elysium.

No one is judged at the first death else they would be judged twice. He quotes Revelation 20:13&14 "And the sea gave up the dead that were in it; and death and hell delivered up the dead which were in them: and they were judged every man according to their works. And death and hell were cast into the lake of fire. This is the second death."

We should not think of our resurrection as the 'springing back to life' of our old bodies, but of a quickening of our seed – like the seed corn which rots in the earth yet comes to life anew when its time is due. This has an egalitarian slant to it: no saint will be resurrected except as all saints are resurrected.

The remainder of the book deals with Predestination and the Two Seeds.

Knowledge is an awareness of good and evil. The irony is that we gain an understanding of what we have lost in the process. Because we have all inherited something down the generations from Adam, our situation, although made baleful by our parallel inheritance from Cain, is not hopeless. This mixed process is said to have begun when the sons of Seth took wives from the daughters of evil men. And it is the meaning of "God loved Jacob and hated Esau before they had done either good or evil" which, says Tomkinson, is an example of the impotence of free-will and human desiring, for "The potter hath power over the clay." The choice is God's and cannot be forced. Good works coming to fruition are not the cause of salvation but evidence that the seed of faith is alive and well in a person.

== "None but Christ" ==
None but Christ is a huge survey of the whole of scripture designed to show that every divinely-inspired 'personality' from Moses to St Thomas Apostle believed, as Muggletonians believe, that Christ was the Holy One of Israel. Hence its title, None but Christ. But, if the message of scripture is so clear and unanimous, why had it become such a minority view by Thomas Tomkinson's time? His answer is that, after its first three hundred years of existence, Christianity was absorbed by the state and misused ever since for the state's own purposes. This oppressive situation will continue until the seventh anti-church (Quakers) expires.

Some readers may find the book obsolete. Its myopic dissection of the text approximates the kind of 'bible literalism' Muggletonians condemn in others. Tomkinson writes at a time when an understanding of the way the text has come down to us was unavailable. It might have been hoped that, with the whole of scripture ranged before him, Tomkinson would have chosen to tackle those texts which seem hardest to square with Muggletonian beliefs. For example, Christ's exorcisms or statements where Trinitarian distinctions are most pronounced. Sadly, he does not. He does little more than introduce some interesting topics, such as whether Isaiah was put to death for proclaiming an embodied God.

== "The Mystery of Faith" ==
The Mystery of Faith deals with four topics:-

- where faith's components come from and why faith is a mystery
- how the components fit together to give faith
- sin, as the opponent of faith
- how to make progress in faith

"In the days of the voice of the Seventh angel, when he shall begin to sound, the Mystery of God shall be finished." Just as God is a mystery, so faith in God is a mystery, too. It is a knowledge of things unseen and thus it is what links us to God because it is that part of our natures which comes from God through Adam and Eve. Faith is an operation of God; let no man glory in manhood. "All is but a tale, dream, or shadow, till faith comes to open the door of the heart." No new faith is given but Adam's old faith is reawakened.

God does not speak directly to the faithful but through his prophets because they speak with the spirit. This process of renewal had a definite beginning with Ezekiel 11: 19 and with Jeremiah 31:31. It is a new covenant in the form of a law of faith. In this, a new heart replaces the old heart. This old heart was defective because it was always divided between the letter and the spirit. 12 apostles were needed to preach the second commission but a whole tribe of Levi, the first. "So likewise is the old heart given in Levi, which will have the old law of the old tabernacle forms, and multitudes of blind priests must be maintained for their fruitless prayers, outward formalities and simple ninny's." Faith needs few preachers. "This made the prophet Isaiah say, Lord who believes our report: and Elias was alone."

Faith is most marvelous "as it stands still, viewing and beholding." Thus the apostles' faith was their simple wonderment at what Christ said and did. Faith is such that although many behold the same events and hear the same speech, some believe and some don't. "This is turning the world upside down."

Tomkinson sees the fight against sin to be won by putting into the field proportionate and opposite forces of faith at an early stage. "Many people do err exceedingly by believing that an evil thought do break the law; but the evil thought doth not break the law as well as the evil deed and this belief of theirs occasions much wickedness, for when they conceive they have broken the law ... they upon this let loose the reins of their lust." More serious sins, such as murder, cannot take hold unless preceded by smaller sins like envy and strife. Tomkinson recognises there is such a thing as righteous anger. But it should not lead to vengeance because that belongs to the Lord. "Fret not against evil doers," he says, "to vex other men is only to teach them how to vex you."

Tomkinson's perusal of various sins gives rise to some interesting observations. Riches are to be sought to the extent that the attainment of them takes away the longing for riches. (This might be the Muggletonian motto.) "Pride is the occasion and cause of persecution and oppression" because the proud do scorn all not of their mind. "It is humility that pricks the bladder and lets forth all the puffing wind."

Love and faith go together like body and soul. "Faith is not seen to be faith if love do not shew it." Faith in the heart and conscience is the only acceptable form of worship. "We do not serve God for salvation, but from salvation." There is no need to call on him to save us.

== "Truth's Triumph" ==
Truth's Triumph is described as Tomkinson's major work. This work was published during Tomkinson's lifetime.

== Collected works ==
A two volume set called Tomkinson's Works was produced by the London Muggletonians at some time between 1873 and 1887. It is similar in style to the three volume set "Miscellaneous Works of Reeve and Muggleton" which was produced by the Frost brothers in 1832 but is less sumptuous being bound in boards and purple cloth, and lacking any special preface. However, like the 1832 set, it is not a new printing, being existing publications trimmed to size and bound more adequately. As a result, volume 1 is not entirely uniform with volume 2, the former being royal octavo, the later octavo.

== Manuscripts ==
Many of Tomkinson's writings circulated only in manuscript. Copying them out was considered a good way to study them. Not all are now known entire. Other fragmentary writings exist. Those known to have circulated widely are:-

- Joyfull newes from heaven for the Jewes are called (undated)
- A survey of the scripture (undated)
- Zions Sonnes (1679) This may have been printed but it has not been reprinted. It is in the form of an appeal to a relative who had left the faith.
- The souls struggle (1681)
- The Christian Convarte (1692). This was the beginnings of a biographical sketch.
- The mystery of Godlyness (1692)
- White divell uncased (undated)
- White divell uncased (1704) which is a different work from the above. It is reproduced in T. L. Underwood Acts of the Witnesses at p. 177
