= Fatal Love (play) =

1680 play

- Written by: Elkanah Settle
- Original language: English
- Genre: Tragedy

Premiere
- Date premiered: September 1680
- Place premiered: Theatre Royal, Drury Lane, London

Fatal Love; Or, The Forc'd Inconstancy is a 1680 tragedy by the English writer Elkanah Settle. It was first staged by the King's Company at the Theatre Royal, Drury Lane in London. The original cast members are unknown. Producer at the time of the Popish Plot scare and the Exclusion Crisis, it was notably anti-Catholic similar to Settle's other tragedy of the same year The Female Prelate.

== Bibliography ==
- Brown, Frank Clyde. Elkanah Settle. University of Chicago Press, 1910.
- Van Lennep, W. The London Stage, 1660-1800: Volume One, 1660-1700. Southern Illinois University Press, 1960.
