= Pastor Fido =

1676 play

- Original language: English
- Written by: Elkanah Settle
- Genre: Tragicomedy

Premiere
- Date: December 1676
- Place: Dorset Garden Theatre, London

Pastor Fido; Or, The Faithful Shepherd is a 1676 tragicomedy by the English writer Elkanah Settle. It was first performed by the Duke's Company at the Dorset Garden Theatre in London. It is inspired by Giovanni Battista Guarini's pastoral work Il pastor fido.

The original cast included Matthew Medbourne as Montano, John Crosby as Sylvio, William Smith as Mirtillo, Thomas Betterton as Sylvano, Henry Norris as Ergasto, Thomas Percival as Carino, John Richards as Dameta, Thomas Gillow as Lynco, Mary Betterton as Amaryllis, Mary Lee as Corisca and Margaret Hughes as Gerana.

== Bibliography ==
- Van Lennep, W. The London Stage, 1660-1800: Volume One, 1660-1700. Southern Illinois University Press, 1960.
