= Ibrahim (play) =

1676 play

- Original language: English
- Written by: Elkanah Settle
- Genre: Tragedy

Premiere
- Date: March 1676
- Place: Dorset Garden Theatre, London

Ibrahim The Illustrious Bassa is a 1676 tragedy by the English writer Elkanah Settle, based on a 1641 novel by the French writer Madeleine de Scudéry. It was first performed by the Duke's Company at the Dorset Garden Theatre in London.

The original cast included Thomas Betterton as Solyman, William Smith as Ibrahim, Henry Harris as Ulama, Matthew Medbourne as Morat, Thomas Gillow as Muphti, Mary Lee as Roxolana, Elizabeth Currer as Asteria, Mary Betterton as Isabella, Margaret Hughes as Mirva.

== Bibliography ==
- Van Lennep, W. The London Stage, 1660-1800: Volume One, 1660-1700. Southern Illinois University Press, 1960.
