= The Town Shifts =

1671 play

- Original language: English
- Written by: Edward Revet
- Genre: Restoration Comedy
- Setting: London, present day

Premiere
- Date: March 1671
- Place: Lincoln's Inn Fields Theatre, London

The Town Shifts; Or, The Suburb-Justice is a 1671 comedy play by Edward Revet. It was originally staged by the Duke's Company at the Lincoln's Inn Fields Theatre in London. It is part of the tradition of Restoration Comedy.

The original cast included Philip Cademan as Lovewell, Matthew Medbourne as Friendly, Edward Angel as Leftwell, Henry Norris as Pett, Samuel Sandford as Frump, Joseph Williams as Moses, Mary Lee as Leticia, Elinor Leigh as Betty and Jane Long as Fickle.

== Bibliography ==
- Canfield, J. Douglas. Tricksters and Estates: On the Ideology of Restoration Comedy. University Press of Kentucky, 2014.
- Van Lennep, W. The London Stage, 1660-1800: Volume One, 1660-1700. Southern Illinois University Press, 1960.
