= Truth's Triumph =

1676 book by Thomas Tomkinson

Truth's triumph: or, A witness to the two witnesses from that unfolded parable of Our Lord and Saviour, Jesus Christ, the High and mighty God: Matthew, chap. 13, verse 30 to 42 is a 1676 theological book by Thomas Tomkinson, written as a defence and explanation of the Muggletonian faith. It addresses common misconceptions about the sect and expands on its core beliefs. Historian William M. Lamont has described the work as Tomkinson's "own greatest contribution" to Muggletonian theology.

== Introduction ==
Tomkinson says he will discuss the fundamentals of the faith under eight heads.

- The True God
- The Two Seeds
- The Right Devil
- Predestination
- The nature of the law
- The mortality of the soul
- The Devil's torments
- The saints' joys in Heaven

The reader is warned that "The Scriptures calls things that are not, as though they were; and sets that first which should be last, and last which should be first; to the end that Reason should never find out the meaning of God in the Scriptures."

Throughout his book, Tomkinson relates his text back to Matthew 13: 37 - 42, wherein Jesus explains the Parable of the Tares.

== The True God ==
Tomkinson addresses a common atheist objection. He agrees it is common sense that everything that has a beginning is likely to have an end, too. But, he objects, it does not follow from this that humans are merely transient beings. Adam was formed from earth and water, 'elements' which the Muggletonians say have existed for all eternity. Thus, humans will be capable of being resurrected as bodies in a glorified condition at world's end. Then, each will have a full understanding of paradise which can only be partially glimpsed now as inner peace and bliss.

Similarly, God could not be an infinite spirit that would have "infused itself into the whole creation" because any meaningful distinction between Creator and creature would then be lost. Tomkinson tries to explain why his notion of a 'spiritual body' does not conjure up a phantom. "The form of the uncreated Majesty, before he became flesh did not consist of any elementary matter, but it was a bright shiny glory of uncompounded purities of so unutterable a nature in virtue, as that it was swifter than thought, clearer than crystal, sweeter than roses, purer than the purest gold, yea, and more infinitely glorious than the sun." The 'swifter than thought' quote is to contradict Quakers who ridiculed the notion of an embodied God lumbering around the universe trying to keep up with events. So, comparing man and God, it was "not the visibility of their persons that differed, but the glory of them only." Tomkinson advances two reasons why this must be so. Firstly, he argued that God created man in his own image and that righteousness and holiness cannot act unless they are embodied in an agent. Secondly, many of the virtues of God relate to states of being and that would be meaningless without a body to be in.

"Now the learned professors resist this doctrine," Tomkinson advises us. Yet this is what mystery means. Those wedded to reason will always look to the bare letter of the law and to their own proud reasonings. Whereas those born of the seed of the woman "can trace the footsteps of the prophets till they come to the paths of God and so find him out and know him."

Tomkinson thinks the impure motives behind the idea of God being pure spirit are only too obvious. He says it was originally a pagan form of self-flattery to imagine there was a little bit of God in us all. He traces its history from Nimrod, through Pythagoras to Pliny the Elder, and tells how they loved to commission statues of themselves to impress others. Scriptural literalists (from Augustine to Richard Baxter) fall into a similar error of human imaginings. Yet there was always an underground stream of the truth. He cites the followers of Sabilis which we would probably label Sabellianism. Also the Athrapamorphets. These truth-sayers were persecuted by the dominant culture due to the take-over of the church by the state and because the Apostles "preached the faith in a personal God, but in that, they clothed it within the appellation of several titles, it appeared more intricate and mysterious" than it really was.

Tomkinson summarises his reasons why an embodied God is the "true lip of heaven".

- that God created man in his own likeness
- that God talked with Adam and Abraham and walked with Enoch
- that God wrestled with Jacob
- that God covered the eyes of Moses
- that the words of the law were scribed by God's own finger.

Wrong doctrine tends to result in evil fruit and Tomkinson expresses this with a remarkable extended metaphor. "Like as to a man that goeth into his garden more for the love of the colour and beauty of an herb or flower than for its virtue or goodness; being thereunto enslaved either from his own fancy or because of an ancient praise to that colour, is not to be reputed wise." In other words, received opinion and tradition do not make for truth. The reason is solely a strategy for marshalling the facts to fit a settled opinion of one's own. In this, God's law counts for nothing but what it will fetch in the course of debate. He gives an example of such atheism as Dr More's Natural Cabala Dr More is reported as giving a remarkably Muggletonian description of God's features and then saying that scripture only uses this language so that "vulgar opinion" can understand it. And learned people misunderstand it, warns Tomkinson.

"Behold your Redeemer who came skipping upon the mountains, bringing glad tidings of peace." Tomkinson says this role of God appearing as redeemer is foretold as of old. He sets out Lactantius' "ancient prophecies of Christ from one of the Sibels." These stress that Christ will make no effort to defend himself against the wrath of the rulers or to justify himself before them. Tomkinson discusses the Testaments of the Twelve Patriarchs and the Book of Enoch at great length including Enoch's special role as protector of the Angels. He makes the point that because men lived so long in those days (Enoch being 380 years old by the time old Adam died) they did not write things down because their memories were a more durable medium than manuscript!

Tomkinson sets out seven arguments to confound the seven anti-churches mentioned in Revelation, all of whom are Trinitarian.

- In a Trinity each component is diminished by its distinction. Acceptance of a Trinity makes it hard not to admit a demiurge, or witches or a shapeshifter mage, as well.
- In a Trinity, there is no satisfactory view of whether the Son is eternal or begotten and, if begotten, how many times; once on earth and once in heaven?
- Christ who is counted amongst the transgressors only functions as a redeemer if it is the deity appearing authentically as a man.
- "Moral philosophy teacheth that there is but one chief good" which is why Jesus asks the young man "why callest thou me good?" meaning, do you recognise me as the very God?
- There is no need to posit a spirit deity capable of being everywhere at once because conscience acts as 'God's watchman' in human hearts.
- If the Holy Ghost is a fruition from others, it is created in time and will end in time.
- Distinguishing Gods creates multiple faiths which is why the history of the anti-churches is one of division and strife.

== The Two Seeds ==
The doctrine of the two seeds (the seed of the woman versus the seed of the serpent) explains the conflict of nature found within everyone. Good and evil cannot derive from one source; evil cannot come from God and is never simply the misapplication of things intended for good. This mixing of seeds first began when the sons of Seth took wives from the daughters of wicked men. So, even Abraham had both seeds within him. It is which seed comes to the top in a person which will determine his or her fate at the end of time with the judgment of the 'second death'. Hence the Lord loved Jacob and hated Esau before they had done either good or evil. Yet Esau gained great blessings along the way even if he will ultimately be cursed by the bad seed within. This form of inheritance means, generally, "it is a great privilege to be a child of a good parent." Or, as Tomkinson memorably puts it; bastard begets bastard. This is a parallel to the way there is generally a physical resemblance between child and parent and it explains Rebecca's anguish, "if Jacob takes a wife of the daughters of Heth ... what good will my life do me?" Yet the rule is not rigid and, ultimately, its workings are a mystery of God's will.

== The Right Devil ==
Tomkinson surveys the churches' views on the nature of the Devil. One popular argument was that he is made of air. "There was one Burgatus confessed that when the Devil gave him his hand, it felt cold; this is brave university learning, a tale of jack pudding; these cold devils might do well to get into hell to warm them." Then he makes the point that the church teaches a lot about the Devil without being able to agree what this Devil is.

Most apparitions are the "imagination of dark frased reason in wicked men." It is the workings of fear on an uneasy conscience that plays such tricks. Yet Tomkinson agrees that signs were given to the prophets of old and these were both by natural means and divine intervention into nature. Hence Jehovah defeated the enemies of Israel; "the noise of a shaken leaf shall chase them and they shall fly as flying from the sword, when none pursueth." But there can be no deliberate conjuration. "Those frogs, grasshoppers and lice that Moses brought up in the sight of Pharaoh were real living substances, but those the magicians produced were nothing but shadows."

Tomkinson admits that witches have an excellent understanding of nature and that is how they dupe those who do not. It is not wrong to say the victim is bewitched. "The imagination of the mind doth do and conceive strong things." Thus, we may swoon when we see another's blood, or vomit when we see something foul, or experience vertigo at a great height. Also, that is why a faith in God works more powerfully in us than a faith in nature itself.

Since Cain, the only Devil is within man. Yet Tomkinson acknowledges that God, who can cause no evil, can stir up the reason within a person that causes evil. For example, David's temptation to number the people. No Satan is involved; only David himself. That is why, after the deed was done, "David's heart smote him." This temptation is popularly called "the cares of the world."

The Great Delusion is to wish to appear important in God's sight. Hence, history is full of religious martyrs who will only die at the second death. "They have chosen their own ways, and their soul delighteth in their abominations. I also will chose their delusions." The weapon against this delusion is humility of heart. As the enemy is within, so is the remedy. It is faith and the obedience of a humble heart that can make a useful servant out of reason. Reason is but desire. The desire for learning, riches and renown "all this is according to reason." Desire for righteousness simply will not work. The world will see to that. "From the works of the law no flesh shall be justified, because there is an inability to do what it requires ... because the declarations of divine truth are not only contrary to reason, but above its reach, and that makes wise men and diviners mad." Tomkinson illustrates his point by showing how reasonable Esau was to object to his treatment.

Tomkinson further argues that there is no trace of reason in God because reason is desire and God lacks nothing. Adam was not created in reason. Had it been otherwise, his problem could have been healed by natural learning and there would be no need of Christ and no need of faith. The worldly case against reason is that its products do not last: a great remedy for some human problem is devised but soon lost patience with and a new novelty is again demanded. Reason should not be discarded but placed as subservient to faith. Reason, like fire and water, is a bad master but a good servant. Above all, one cannot use reason to seek out the Lord.

== Predestination ==
The seed of the woman is predestined to eternal life and the seed of the serpent to damnation. There is neither choice nor chance in this. It was God's purpose from the foundation of the world. If we did not know this of God, we would know nothing of God and would attribute everything to our own natures. "Here reason keeps a great clamour, and saith, doth God make man to damn him?" Tomkinson holds that repentance is a sign of God's grace working, not what calls forth the grace in the first place. People are not their own saviours because their efforts are always inadequate to the task. Those who live by good works and piety will get only the rewards of the law. On the other hand, what is in a person's heart is put there by God. Reason is at a loss here because it seems that God's requirements are so demanding, no one could satisfy them. Tomkinson retorts, "But what has God taken from you that has so weakened you?" Which is why he came to call sinners, not the righteous. He gives the example of Mary Magdalene.

== The Nature of the Law ==
Both the reprobate angel and Cain were proud and wanted things done their own way. Hence Cain's sacrifice was unacceptable to God. The Mosaic Law was designed for an age of reason and pride. Such a law was not to bless the righteous, but to hobble those given to lawlessness. No written law can take away sin any more than washing with water can. But the gospel of Jesus is completely different. It is a composition of faith, not precepts, and the remedy available under this law is free grace.

The seed of the serpent is not necessarily intent upon evil. But its attempts to do good are ineffectual because it is motivated by self-conceit. "It was said of Scipio when a beautiful strumpet was tendered to him to abuse himself withall, I would willingly (said he) were it not for the great place I am in."

== The Mortality of the Soul ==
"The common opinion of the world is that all men's souls are immortal and cannot, or do not die, but slip out of their bodies as out of a prison, into some other world, either of pleasure or misery."

Muggletonians believe that man has body and soul all-of-a-piece and, since the fall, has reason added to this. With sin comes defilement and death, but there is also God's promise that the seed of the woman shall bruise the serpent's head. This is taken to mean that the elect shall not die the second death, although the seed of the serpent most definitely will.

It is a complete misunderstanding, says Tomkinson, to believe that with every birth a soul comes from God. "Body and soul of man is but one living and dying essence, proceeding from nature." Regarding the death of the soul, Christ is our example. Christ could not have redeemed the elect from their sins if he had died only in the body. The elect, "being dead whilst in the grave ... although alive in the memory of Christ, which is the Book of Life, and the white stone and their new name written in it." "Thus we see no going to heaven until Christ come again to gather his elect." In like manner, the reprobate will suffer both in body and soul but not until the great day when Christ returns to this earth to separate the sheep and the goats.

== The Devil's torments ==
Tomkinson surveys what he regards as historical attitudes to hell. He says that the common manner of pagan writers was to see it as a place of cleansing and purifying, rather than of punishment. A more modern view was that of Jacob Boehme that heaven and hell are within one another. Tomkinson jests, "but of late there is made a new discovery of another world placed in the moon and as habitable as this is." But none of these speculations is correct. Hell will be this earth after the end of time. "I will judge thee in the place thou wast created." "Their iniquity shall be upon their bones." The elect will be quickened to eternal life and the damned will be quickened to their torment. The damned shall come out of their graves as worms out of the earth and, after they have seen the elect rise up with Christ to heaven; the sun, stars and moon will cave in aflame. Then there will be blackness within and without as the earth is abandoned by God forever. The life of the damned will be to die forever in a hell that is their own bodies, tormented by the remembrance of sins they can never shake off. "Every evil action will arise afresh in the mind." Tomkinson is poetic, not forgiving. "There will never be any intermission of pain, for as soon as one phial of wrath is drank off, another is presented without stop or stay, coming rolling one upon another, like waves of the sea." This treatment will ensure new blasphemies against God for all eternity. With unusual grimness, Tomkinson remarks that if the reprobate seed "can make shift to disbelieve it, they may have the more ease and time to fit them for the everlasting burning by making their bodies and spirits like a dry thorny hedge, to receive the fury of that fire."

== The Saint's Joys in Heaven ==
"Then we shall be dunned in the teeth no more by scoffing Ishmaelites," says Tomkinson, with apparent feeling. "For this know, there is no other righteousness available but that which is sowed in peace and love, silence and secrecy, as it is written, enter your chamber and be still." All-Saints Day will be a harvest of happiness. Each saint will greet his or her guardian angel. "Then shall we rest like infants in our Lord's arms." "We shall not know each other as to natural relations" as mother or wife but as a spiritual kinship. Each person will still be unique and distinguishable but in a "spiritual love-fire" not in earthly terms. This kingdom is a kingdom of love, for love knows no opposition. Now that there is no more sin, why should we ever be angry again?"
