= Herod and Mariamne =

1671 play

- Written by: Samuel Pordage
- Original language: English
- Genre: Tragedy

Premiere
- Date premiered: September 1671
- Place premiered: Lincoln's Inn Fields Theatre, London

Herod and Mariamne is a 1671 tragedy by the English writer Samuel Pordage. It was first performed by the Duke's Company at the Lincoln's Inn Fields Theatre in London shortly before they moved to the Dorset Gardens Theatre. It was the company's attempt to respond to the great success of John Dryden's heroic drama The Conquest of Granada by the rival King's Company. It is inspired by the accounts of Josephus portraying the reign of Herod II.

== Cast ==
- Matthew Medbourne as Herod
- John Crosby as Pheroras
- John Lee as Alexas
- William Smith as Tyridates
- Henry Norris as Arsanes
- Anthony Leigh as Polites
- Thomas Gillow as Sosius
- Mary Betterton as Mariamne
- Mary Lee as Salome
- Margaret Osborne as Alexandra

== Bibliography ==
- Howe, Elizabeth. The First English Actresses: Women and Drama, 1660-1700. Cambridge University Press, 1992.
- Nicoll, Allardyce. History of English Drama, 1660-1900: Volume 1, Restoration Drama, 1660-1700. Cambridge University Press, 1952.
- Van Lennep, W. The London Stage, 1660-1800: Volume One, 1660-1700. Southern Illinois University Press, 1960.
