= A True Widow =

1678 play by Thomas Shadwell

- Original language: English
- Written by: Thomas Shadwell
- Genre: Restoration Comedy

Premiere
- Date: 21 March 1678
- Place: Dorset Garden Theatre, London

A True Widow is a 1678 comedy play by the English writer Thomas Shadwell. It was first staged by the Duke's Company at the Dorset Garden Theatre in London. The names of the original cast are unknown. The prologue was written by Shadwell's colleague John Dryden. It was published the following year and dedicated to Charles Sedley.

== Bibliography ==
- Canfield, J. Douglas. Tricksters and Estates: On the Ideology of Restoration Comedy. University Press of Kentucky, 2014.
- Van Lennep, W. The London Stage, 1660-1800: Volume One, 1660-1700. Southern Illinois University Press, 1960.
