= Johann Ferdinand Hertodt =

Johann Ferdinand Hertodt von Todtenfeld (1645–1724) was a German physician and writer, born in the town Nikolsburg, today Mikulov in Moravia.

He is known for his 1671 work Crocologia, entirely devoted to saffron. He was also an alchemical writer, in the Epistolam contra Philalethem, a botanical and geological in Tartaro-Mastix Moraviae (1669), and a medical in Opus mirificum sextae diei (1670).
