= Crocologia =

Crocologia is a 1671 botany book by the German physician and writer Johann Ferdinand Hertodt. Hertodt devotes the entire book to the study and examination of saffron; the subtitle is: "A Detailed Study of Saffron, the King of Plants". He discusses the origin, cultivation, and medicinal properties of the plant. Hertoldt's rival Wenzel Maximilian Ardensbach wrote a contemporary animadversion against the book.
