= The Virtuoso (play) =

17th-century play by Thomas Shadwell

The Virtuoso is a Restoration comedy by Thomas Shadwell, first produced at Dorset Garden Theatre in 1676 by The Duke's Company. Well received in its original production, it was revived several times over the next thirty years and "always found Success." The original cast included Anthony Leigh as Sir Formal Trifle, Cave Underhill as Sir Samuel Hearty, Thomas Betterton as Longvill, Thomas Jevon as Hazard, Thomas Percival as Sir Nicholas Gimcrack, Anne Shadwell as Lady Gimcrack, Elizabeth Currer as Clarinda and Mary Betterton as Miranda.

Shadwell is acknowledged as the most topical of the major Restoration playwrights and the uniqueness of The Virtuoso lies primarily in its highly relevant satire on contemporary science and on the Royal Society, which, founded in 1660, was of great interest to Restoration audiences.

Shadwell was also known as the Restoration's leading advocate of Ben Jonson's style of humour comedy, in which each humorous character displays one unique and excessive folly. In his dedication to The Virtuoso, Shadwell claimed that he had created four entirely new humours characters, by which he meant the titular virtuoso Sir Nicholas Gimcrack, Sir Formal Trifle (described in the cast list as "the Orator, a florid coxcomb"), Sir Samuel Hearty ("a brisk, amorous, adventurous, unfortunate coxcomb; one that by the help of humorous, nonsensical bywords takes himself to be a wit"), and Sir Nicholas's uncle Snarl ("an old, pettish fellow, a great admirer of the last age and a declaimer against the vices of this, and privately very vicious himself.") Though some critics believe that Sir Nicholas is an inconsistent character, of the four, his is the character with the most significant literary legacy. Scholars have discerned the influence of Sir Nicholas in the works of numerous subsequent playwrights, including Thomas d'Urfey, Lawrence Maidwell, Susanna Centlivre, Aphra Behn, and Peter Pindar.

== Plot summary ==
Bruce and Longvil, two young men-about-town, described by Shadwell in the cast list as "Gentlemen of wit and sense," have fallen in love with the two nieces of the virtuoso, Sir Nicholas Gimcrack. Bruce is in love with Clarinda and Longvil with Miranda. Unfortunately, Clarinda is in love with Longvil and Miranda with Bruce. Each lady also has a rival suitor. Clarinda is wooed by her uncle's best friend, the absurd orator Sir Formal Trifle, and Miranda by a gallant fool, Sir Samuel Hearty.

To gain admittance to Sir Nicholas's house where they can see their beloveds, Bruce and Longvil feign an interest in Sir Nicholas's absurd experiments, which include learning to swim on dry land by imitating a frog, transfusing the blood of a sheep into a man (resulting in a sheep's tail growing out of the man's anus), and bottling air from various parts of the country to be stored in his cellar like wine.

While they attempt to pay court to Miranda and Clarinda, Bruce and Longvil are in turn courted by Sir Nicholas's promiscuous wife, Lady Gimcrack, who also keeps a lover, Hazard, on the side. Sir Nicholas similarly keeps a lover by the name of Mrs. Flirt, who in turn is having an affair with Hazard.

The cast is rounded out by Sir Nicholas's curmudgeonly uncle Snarl, whose money Sir Nicholas hopes to inherit, and Snarl's whore Mrs. Figgup.

There follow various contrivances and convolutions, including the seduction of both Bruce and Longvil by Lady Gimcrack, the attempted rape of Sir Samuel (disguised as a woman) by Sir Formal, the discovery that Snarl has a fetish for being beaten with rods, and an uprising of ribbon-weavers, upset because they fear Sir Nicholas has invented a machine that will put them out of business.

Ultimately, Bruce and Longvil pragmatically conclude that Bruce should transfer his affections to Miranda (who loves him) and Longvil should transfer his to Clarinda (who loves him.) Meanwhile, Sir Nicholas receives the terrible news that his estates have been seized to pay off debts incurred in his scientific pursuits. He first turns to his wife for help, but she abandons him in favour of Hazard, taking her money with her, then to his uncle Snarl, but Snarl reveals that he has married Mrs. Figgup and Sir Nicholas's hopes of inheriting his money are dashed. Last, Sir Nicholas begs his nieces for their fortunes, but they reveal that they have settled guardianship of their estates with Bruce and Longvil. Hoping at least for continuing love from Mrs. Flirt, Sir Nicholas is once again disappointed, as she informs him that she "love(s) men but as far as their money goes."

Sir Nicholas is left a ruined man, yet still hoping to discover the philosopher's stone, and Bruce and Longvil are happy in their hopes of eventual marriages to Miranda and Clarinda, respectively.

== Scientific satire ==
As Claude Lloyd has demonstrated, virtually all of the experiments that Sir Nicholas Gimcrack performs can be traced directly to a real scientific experiment of the day, most reported either in Robert Hooke’s Micrographia or Philosophical Transactions of the Royal Society. Hooke himself actually attended a performance of the original production and, humiliated, identified himself as the specific target of Shadwell's satire.

While many critics interpret the play as a direct attack on the Royal Society, others argue that, far from satirising the Royal Society, Shadwell was actually focusing on specific follies that the Royal Society expressly rejected, or that, as members of the Royal Society at that time included both serious scientists and amateur virtuosos, Shadwell was striking a deathblow against the virtuosos specifically, but that the serious scientists were above attack and thus unharmed by Shadwell's satire.
