= The Female Prelate =

1680 play

- Original language: English
- Written by: Elkanah Settle
- Genre: Tragedy
- Setting: Rome, 9th Century

Premiere
- Date: 31 May 1680
- Place: Theatre Royal, Drury Lane, London

The Female Prelate; Being The History Of The Life And Death Of Pope Joan is a 1680 tragedy by the English writer Elkanah Settle. It was first performed by the King's Company at the Theatre Royal, Drury Lane in London. The original cast members are unknown. It is also known by the shorter title Pope Joan.

It is based on the legendary Pope Joan. It was produced at the height of the Popish Plot scare, when attempts were being made to exclude the Catholic heir James, Duke of York from the throne. Consequently, it is written from an anti-Catholic viewpoint. Settle dedicated a 1681 published version to the Earl of Shaftesbury, the Whig leader.

== Bibliography ==
- Brown, Frank Clyde. Elkanah Settle. University of Chicago Press, 1910.
- Tumbleson, Raymond D. Catholicism in the English Protestant Imagination: Nationalism, Religion, and Literature, 1660-1745. Cambridge University Press, 1998.
- Van Lennep, W. The London Stage, 1660-1800: Volume One, 1660-1700. Southern Illinois University Press, 1960.
