= Thomas Shadwell =

17th-century English poet and playwright

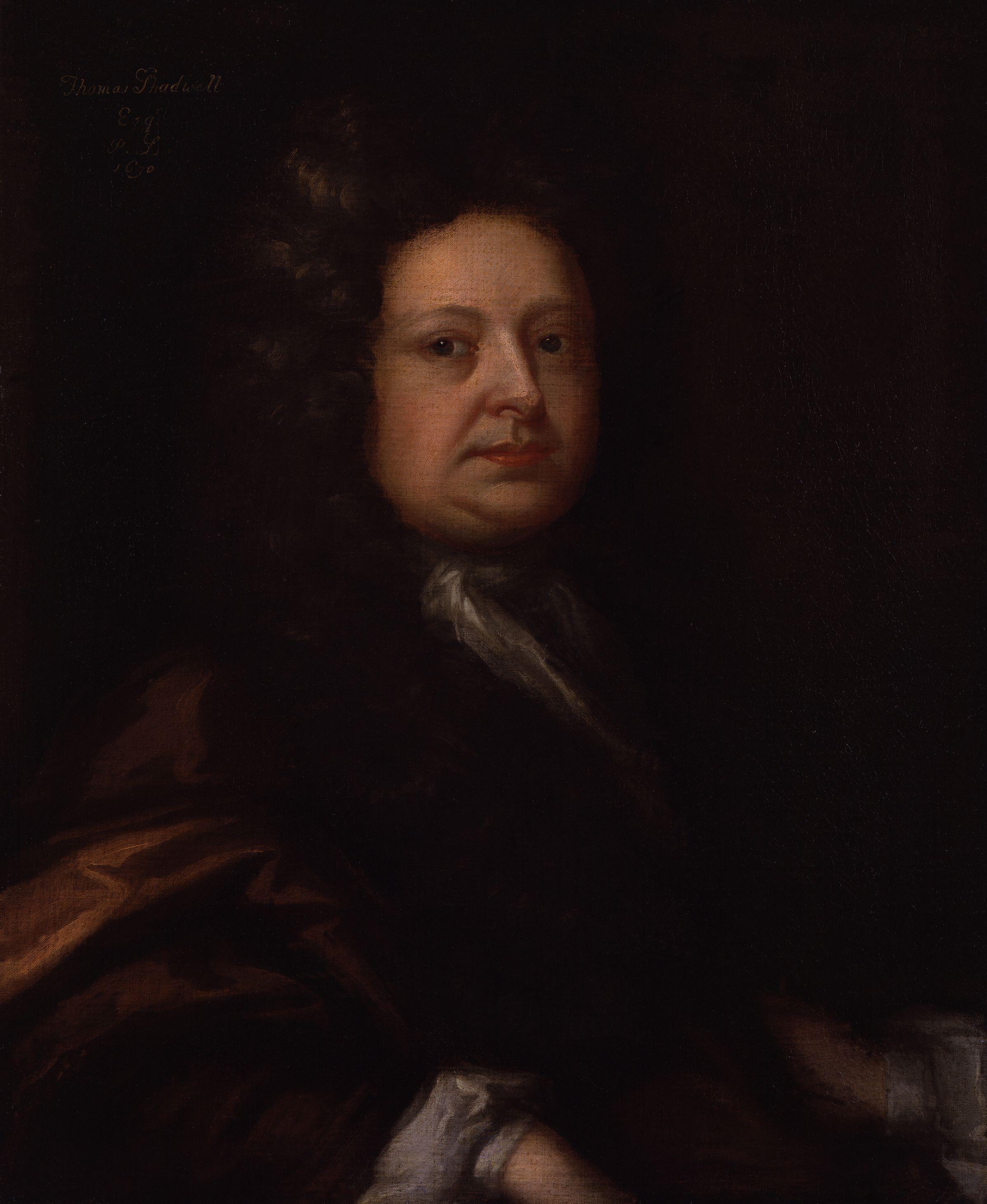

Poet Laureate of England
- In office 9 March 1689 – 19 or 20 November 1692
- Monarchs: William III and Mary II
- Preceded by: John Dryden
- Succeeded by: Nahum Tate

Personal details
- Born: c. 1642 Weeting or Lynford, Norfolk, England
- Died: 19 November 1692 (aged approx. 49–50) London, England
- Spouse: Anne Shadwell
- Children: 4, including Charles
- Education: Gonville and Caius College, Cambridge
- Occupation: Poet, playwright
- Awards: Poet laureate
- Writing career
- Notable works: Epsom Wells; Squire of Alsatia

Thomas Shadwell (c. 1642 – 19 November 1692) was an English poet and playwright who was appointed Poet Laureate in 1689.

== Life ==
Shadwell was born at either Bromehill Farm, Weeting-with-Broomhill or Santon House, Lynford, Norfolk, and educated at Bury St Edmunds School, and at Gonville and Caius College, Cambridge, which he entered in 1656. He left the university without a degree and joined the Middle Temple. At the Whig triumph in 1688, he superseded John Dryden as poet laureate and historiographer royal. He died at Chelsea on 19 November 1692. He was buried in Chelsea Old Church, but his tomb was destroyed by wartime bombing. A memorial to him with a bust by Francis Bird survives in Poets' Corner in Westminster Abbey.

He was married to the actress Anne Shadwell, who appeared in several of his plays. They had four children, including the playwright Charles Shadwell and John Shadwell, a physician who attended both Queen Anne and King George I.

== Works ==
In 1668 he produced a prose comedy, The Sullen Lovers, or the Impertinents, based on Les Fâcheux by Molière, and written in open imitation of Ben Jonson's comedy of humours. His best plays are Epsom Wells (1672), for which Sir Charles Sedley wrote a prologue, and The Squire of Alsatia (1688). Alsatia was the cant name for the Whitefriars area of London, then a kind of sanctuary for persons liable to arrest, and the play represents, in dialogue full of the local argot, the adventures of a young heir who falls into the hands of the sharpers there.

For fourteen years from the production of his first comedy to his memorable encounter with John Dryden, Shadwell produced a play nearly every year. These productions display a hatred of sham, and a rough but honest moral purpose. Although bawdy, they present a vivid picture of contemporary manners.

Shadwell is chiefly remembered as the unfortunate Mac Flecknoe of Dryden's satire, the "last great prophet of tautology", and the literary son and heir of Richard Flecknoe:

"Shadwell alone, of all my sons, is he

Who stands confirm'd in full stupidity.

The rest to some faint meaning make pretence,

But Shadwell never deviates into sense."

Dryden had furnished Shadwell with a prologue to his True Widow (1679) and, in spite of momentary differences, the two had been on friendly terms. But when Dryden converted to Catholicism, joined the court party and produced Absalom and Achitophel and The Medal, Shadwell became the champion of the Protestants and made a scurrilous attack on Dryden in The Medal of John Bayes: a Satire against Folly and Knavery (1682). Dryden immediately retorted in Mac Flecknoe, or a Satire on the True Blue Protestant Poet, T.S. (1682), in which Shadwell's personal attacks were returned with interest. In 1687, Shadwell attempted to answer these attacks in a version of Juvenal's 10th Satire. However, Dryden's portrait of Shadwell as Og in the second part of Absalom and Achitophel cut far deeper and has withstood the test of time:

"A monstrous mass of foul corrupted matter,

As all the devils had spew'd to make the batter.

When wine has given him courage to blaspheme,

He curses God, but God before curst him; [...]

The midwife laid her hand on his thick skull,

With this prophetic blessing-- Be thou dull;

Drink, swear and roar, forbear no lewd delight

Fit for thy bulk, do anything but write".

Nonetheless, due to the political triumph of the Whig party in 1688, Shadwell superseded his enemy as Poet Laureate and historiographer royal.

His son, Charles Shadwell was also a playwright. A scene from his play The Stockjobbers was included as an introduction in Caryl Churchill's Serious Money (1987).

== Poems ==
=== Dear Pretty Youth ===
Dear Pretty Youth

Dear pretty youth, unveil your eyes,
How can you sleep when I am by?
Were I with you all night to be,
Methinks I could from sleep be free.
Alas, my dear, you're cold as stone:
You must no longer lie alone.
But be with me my dear, and I in each arm
Will hug you close and keep you warm.

=== Love in their little veins inspires ===
Love in their little veins inspires

Love in their little veins inspires
their cheerful notes, their soft desires.
While heat makes buds and blossoms spring,
those pretty couples love and sing.
But winter puts out their desire,
and half the year they want love's fire.

=== Nymphs and Shepherds ===
Nymphs and Shepherds

Nymphs and shepherds, come away.
In ye groves let's sport and play,
For this is Flora's holiday,
Sacred to ease and happy love,
To dancing, to music and to poetry;
Your flocks may now securely rove
Whilst you express your jollity.
Nymphs and shepherds, come away.

== Bibliography ==
A complete edition of Shadwell's works was published by another son, Sir John Shadwell, in 1720. Thomas Shadwell's other dramatic works are:

- The Sullen Lovers (1668), adapted from Molière
- The Royal Shepherdess (1669), an adaptation of John Fountain's Rewards of Virtue
- The Humorist (1671)
- The Miser (1672), adapted from Molière
- Psyche (1675)
- The Libertine (1676)
- The Virtuoso (1676)
- The History of Timon of Athens the Man-hater (1678), — on this Shakespearian adaptation see Oscar Beber's inaugural dissertation, Thom. Shadwell's Bearbeitung des Shakespeare'schen "Timon of Athens" (Rostock, 1897)
- A True Widow (1679)
- The Woman Captain (1680), revived in 1744 as The Prodigal
- The Lancashire Witches and Teague O'Divelly, the Irish Priest (1682)
- Bury Fair (1689)
- The Amorous Bigot, with the second part of Teague O'Divelly (1690)
- The Scowrers (1691)
- The Volunteers, or Stockjobbers, published posthumously (1693)

== See also ==
- Restoration comedy

== Notes ==
Court offices
Preceded by John Dryden	British Poet Laureate; 1689–1692	Succeeded by Nahum Tate
Preceded by John Dryden	English Historiographer Royal; 1689–1692	Succeeded by Thomas Rymer
