= James Nokes =

James Nokes (Noke, Noak, Noakes) (died c.1692) was an English actor, whose laughter-arousing genius was attested by Cibber and other contemporaries.

== Life ==
Nokes was one of the male actors who played female roles in the newly reopened playhouses shortly after the Restoration of Charles II. This practice didn't last long, as Thomas Killigrew's King's Company put the first English actress on the stage in December 1660, and from then on they appeared more and more frequently, until in 1662 Charles II ordered that only women should play female roles. There was a brief period in late 1660 and early 1661 when both men and women were playing female roles. On 29 January 1661, the diarist Samuel Pepys went to the Duke's playhouse, where "after great patience and little expectation, from so poor beginning, I saw three acts of 'The Mayd in ye Mill' acted to my great content." It was Nokes who was playing the title female role of the Mayd.

Sir Martin Mar-all, Sir Davy Dunce and Sir Credulous Easy were among his favourite parts. His success as the Nurse in Nevil Payne's Fatal Jealousy was so great that he was thereafter nicknamed "Nurse Nokes."
