= Elkanah Settle =

English poet and playwright (1648–1724)

Elkanah Settle (1 February 1648 – 12 February 1724) was an English poet and playwright.

== Biography ==
He was born at Dunstable, and entered Trinity College, Oxford, in 1666, but left without taking a degree. His first tragedy, Cambyses, King of Persia, was produced at Lincoln's Inn Fields in 1667. The success of this play led the Earl of Rochester to encourage the new writer as a rival to John Dryden. Through his influence, Settle's The Empress of Morocco (1673) was twice performed at Whitehall, and proved a great success. It is said by John Dennis to have been "the first play that was ever sold in England for two shillings, and the first play that was ever printed with cuts." These illustrations represent scenes in the theatre, and make the book very valuable.

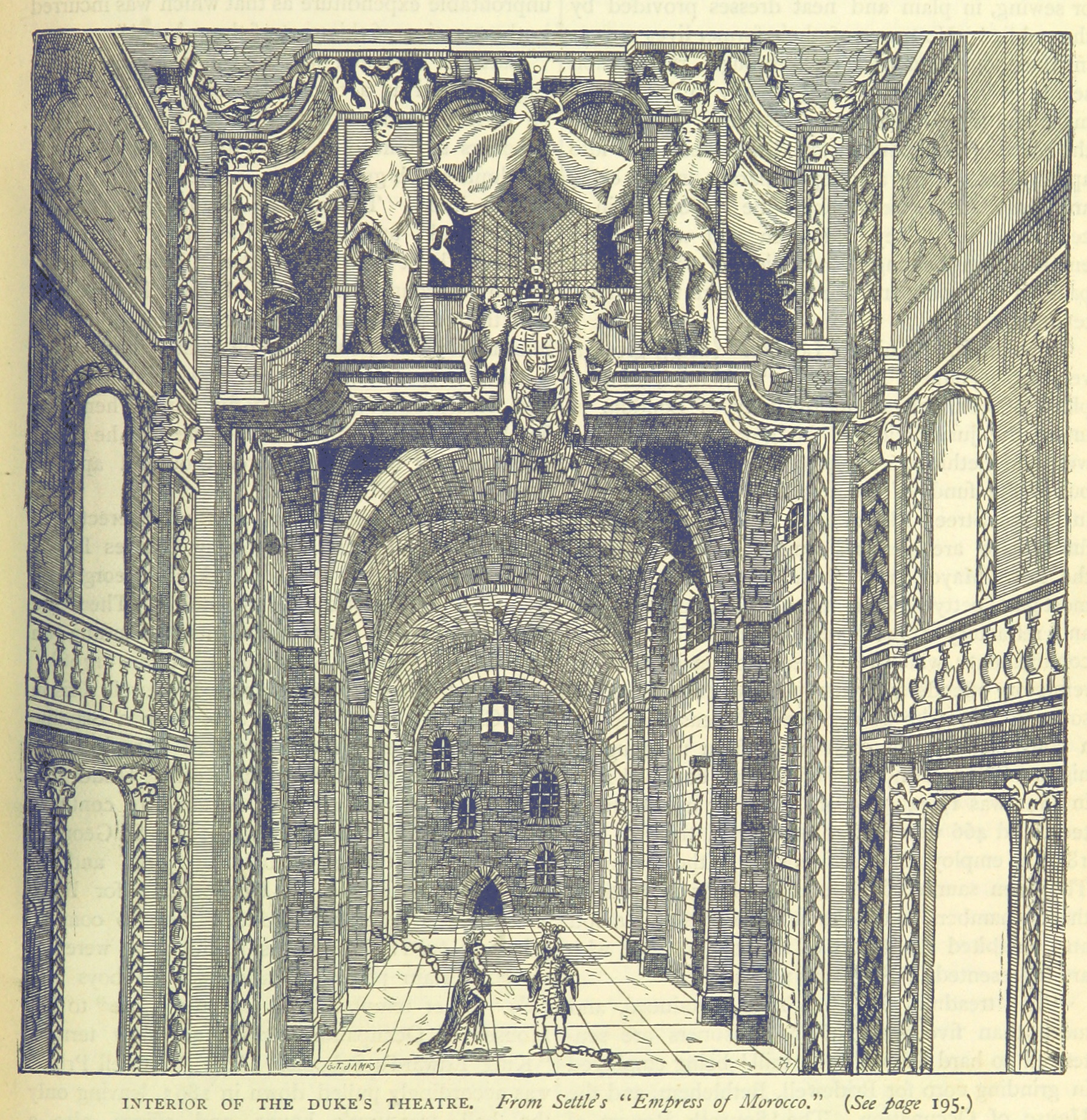
A performance of the Empress of Morocco in 1678 at the Duke's Theatre

The play was printed with a preface to the Earl of Norwich, in which Settle described with scorn the effusive dedications of other dramatic poets. Dryden was obviously aimed at, and he co-operated with John Crowne and Thomas Shadwell in an abusive pamphlet entitled "Notes and Observations on the Empress of Morocco" (1674), to which Settle replied in "Some Notes and Observations on the Empress of Morocco revised" (1674). In the second part of Absalom and Achitophel, in a passage certainly by Dryden's hand, he figures as "Doeg."

Dryden seems to have been affected by this, at least according to Samuel Johnson, who wrote in Lives of the Poets (1779):

About this time, in 1673, Dryden seems to have had his quiet much disturbed by the success of the Emperess of Morocco, a tragedy written in rhyme, by Elkanah Settle; which was so much applauded, as to make him think his supremacy of reputation in some danger. Settle had not only been prosperous on the stage, but, in the confidence of success, had published his play, with sculptures and a preface of defiance. Here was one offence added to another; and, for the last blast of inflammation, it was acted at Whitehall by the court ladies.

Neglected by the court party, he took an active share in the anti-popish agitation. When this subsided he helped expose Titus Oates, and with the Revolution of 1688, he veered towards the Whig party. Having lost the confidence of both sides, "recanting Settle" abandoned politics for the appointment (1691) of city poet.

From 1700, he initiated what has been called a "successful racket" where he would write occasional poems, typically eulogistic or nuptial verse, have them bound up in notably ostentatious armorial bindings, which he would send to the wealthy person whose arms he used. The economics of the practice are unclear; he may have had them commissioned, or been offering them for sale, or (a subtle distinction) have offered to present them in return for literary patronage in cash or some other form. If the book was returned he would try another patron with a new set of arms, altering personal references as required; where the subject matter was shared (as in a wedding) much of the verse could be recycled from one poem to another, and the scholar F. C. Brown has noticed that as many as two-thirds of the lines in Settle's wedding poems are "common to all." The books were bound for Settle by an unknown binder, whose work is remarkable for being "the only instance in which a particular binder has consistently ornamented a large series of bindings with heraldic designs" outside of Royal binders. The bindings are sufficiently distinctive to be known as Settle bindings. More than 100 examples survive, from between 1700 and 1723. In his old age he kept a booth at Bartholomew Fair, where he is said to have played the part of the dragon in a green leather suit devised by himself. He became a poor brother of the Charterhouse, where he died.

Settle is one of the dunces in Alexander Pope's The Dunciad, handing over his authority to Lewis Theobald and in the 1742 edition Colley Cibber. Settle appears in Boswell's life of Dr Johnson, when John Wilkes ascribes the poet's obscurity to his 'queer' name.

== Selected works ==
Settle's numerous works include, beside numerous political pamphlets and occasional poems:

- The Empress of Morocco (1673), a tragedy
- Love and Revenge (1674), a tragedy
- Pastor Fido (1676), a tragicomedy
- Ibrahim, the Illustrious Bassa (1676), a tragedy taken from Madeleine de Scudéry's romance
- The Female Prelate (1680), a tragedy
- Fatal Love (1680), a tragedy
- The Heir of Morocco, with the Death of Gayland (1682), a tragedy and sequel to The Empress of Morocco
- Distressed Innocence (1690), a tragedy
- The New Athenian Comedy (1693), a satirical comedy written about The Athenian Society
- The Ambitious Slave (1694), a tragedy
- The World in the Moon (1697), an opera inspired by Francis Godwin's The Man in the Moone, of which the first scene was formed by a moon fourteen feet across
- The Virgin Prophetess, or The Fate of Troy (1701), an opera
- The City Ramble (1701), a comedy

== Elkanah Settle in the 21st century ==
Shortly before the Scottish Referendum in September 2014, a copy of Settle's Carmen Irenicum: The Union of the Imperial Crowns of Great Britain, a poem supporting the union of England and Scotland that is dedicated to the monarch Queen Anne, went on sale for £3,250. In 2015, it was reported that the Wetherspoons pub in Dunstable was going to be called The Elkanah Settle, until it was realised that the Hollywood actor Gary Cooper also had a connection with the town (he attended the local grammar school), so the tavern was named The Gary Cooper instead.

Civic offices
Preceded by Matthew Taubman	Poet to the Corporation of London; 1691–1724?	Succeeded by Position abolished
