= List of English writers (R–Z) =

List of English writers lists writers in English, born or raised in England (or who lived in England for a lengthy period), who already have Wikipedia pages. References for the information here appear on the linked Wikipedia pages. The list is incomplete – please help to expand it by adding Wikipedia page-owning writers who have written extensively in any genre or field, including science and scholarship. Please follow the entry format. A seminal work added to a writer's entry should also have a Wikipedia page. This is a subsidiary to the List of English people. There are or should be similar lists of Irish, Scots, Welsh, Manx, Jersey, and Guernsey writers.

Abbreviations: AV = Authorized King James Version of the Bible, c. = circa; century; cc. = centuries; cleric = Anglican priest, fl. = floruit = flourished, RC = Roman Catholic, SF = science fiction, YA = young adult fiction

== R ==
- Jonathan Raban (1942–2023), travel writer
- Michael Rabbet (c. 1562–1630), AV translator and cleric
- Ann Radcliffe (1764–1823), novelist, The Mysteries of Udolpho
- Jeremiah Radcliffe (died 1612 or c. 1620), scholar, AV translator and cleric
- Dollie Radford (real name Caroline Maitland, 1858–1920), poet and writer
- Simon Rae (living), poet and cricket writer
- Elizabeth Raffald (1833–1881), cookery writer
- Shahida Rahman (born 1971), writer and publisher
- Bali Rai (born 1971), YA novelist
- Craig Raine (born 1944) poet and critic
- Kathleen Raine (1908–2003), poet and translator
- Nina Raine (living), playwright and director
- John Rainolds (1549–1607), AV translator and cleric
- Ross Raisin (born 1979), novelist
- Arthur Raistrick (1896–1991), polymath
- Walter Raleigh or Ralegh (1552–1618), poet and navigator
- Walter Raleigh (1861–1922), scholar and poet
- Lobsang Rampa (real name Cyril Henry Hoskin, 1910–1981), novelist
- Leonard G. G. Ramsey (1913–1990), writer, editor and encyclopaedist
- Thomas Randolph (1605–1635), poet
- William Brighty Rands (wrote as Henry Holbeach and Matthew Browne, 1823–1882), children's writer and hymnist
- Charles Rangeley-Wilson (living), novelist and poet
- George Ranken (1828–1856), soldier and travel writer
- Nicholas Rankin (born 1950), biographer, historian and broadcaster
- Arthur Ransome (1884–1967), children's writer, Swallows and Amazons
- Ellen Henrietta Ranyard (1810–1879), religious writer
- Hastings Rashdall (1858–1924), philosopher and cleric
- John Rastell or Rastall (c. 1475–1536) chronicler and playwright
- Julian Rathbone (1935–2008), novelist
- Terence Rattigan (1911–1977), playwright and screenwriter The Winslow Boy
- Simon Raven (1927–2001), novelist, screenwriter and playwright
- Ralph Ravens (c. 1553–1615), scholar, AV translator and cleric
- Edward Ravenscroft (c. 1654–1707), playwright
- Gwen Raverat (1885–1957), memoirist and illustrator
- Thomas Ravis (c. 1560–1609), scholar, AV translator and bishop
- George Rawlinson (1812–1902), scholar, historian and cleric
- Hardwicke Rawnsley (1851–1920), poet and hymnist
- Tom Raworth (1938–2017), poet
- John Ray (1627–1705), naturalist and lexicographer
- Derek Raymond (real name R. W. A. Cook, 1931–1994), novelist
- Claire Rayner (1931–2010), novelist and broadcaster
- Jay Rayner (born 1966), novelist and food writer
- Shoo Rayner (originally Hugh Rayner, 1956), children's writer and illustrator
- Benedict Read (1945–2016), art critic
- Herbert Read (1893–1968), poet, critic and novelist
- Miss Read (real name Dora Jessie Saint, 1913–2012), novelist, autobiographer and children's writer
- Piers Paul Read (born 1941), novelist and writer
- Charles Reade (1814–1884), novelist, The Cloister and the Hearth
- Hazel Alden Reason (1901–1976), writer on science for children
- John Redford (died 1547), poet, playwright and composer
- Peter Redgrove (1932–2003), poet, novelist and editor
- Patrick Redmond (born 1966), thriller writer
- Henry Reed (1914–1986), poet and translator
- Isaac Reed (1742–1807), biographer and Shakespearean
- Jeremy Reed (born 1951), poet, novelist and critic
- Talbot Baines Reed (1852–1893), children's novelist
- Douglas Reeman (wrote as Alexander Kent, 1924–2017), novelist
- David Rees (1936–1993), children's writer
- Terence Reese (1913–1996), bridge writer
- Clara Reeve (1729–1807), novelist, The Old English Baron
- John Reeve (1608–1658), religious writer
- Philip Reeve (born 1966), children's writer and illustrator
- Amber Reeves (1887–1981), novelist and writer
- James Reeves (originally John Morris Reeves, 1909–1978), poet and children's writer
- Christopher Reid (born 1949), poet and essayist
- Jonathan Rendall (born 1964), novelist
- Ruth Rendell (also as Barbara Vine, 1930–2015), novelist
- Louise Rennison (1951–2016), children's writer and comic
- John Reresby (1634–1689), politician and diarist
- Frederic Reynolds (1764–1841), playwright
- George W. M. Reynolds (1814–1879, novelist and journalist
- Henry Reynolds (1564–1632), poet, translator and critic
- John Hamilton Reynolds (1794–1852), poet
- Dan Rhodes (born 1972), novelist and story writer
- Pam Rhodes (born 1950), novelist and broadcaster
- William Barnes Rhodes (1772–1826), playwright
- Ernest Rhys (1859–1946), writer, poet and editor
- David Ricardo (1772–1823), political economist
- Ben Rice (born 1972), novelist
- James Rice (1843–1882), novelist
- Barnabe Rich (c. 1540–1617), writer and soldier
- Alfred Bate Richards (1820–1876), playwright, poet and essayist
- I. A. Richards (1893–1979), critic
- Justin Richards (born 1961), novelist
- Vernon Richards (originally Vero Recchioni, 1915–2001), anarchist writer
- Dorothy Richardson (1873–1957), novelist and translator
- Elizabeth Richardson (1576/1577–1651), religious writer
- John Richardson (died 1625), scholar, AV translator and cleric
- John Richardson (1657–1753), Quaker preacher and memoirist
- Samuel Richardson (1689–1761), novelist, Pamela
- Christopher Ricks (born 1933), critic and anthologist
- Edgell Rickword (1898–1982), poet, critic and editor
- Anne Ridler (1912–2001), poet and editor
- James Ridley (wrote as Charles Morell, 1736–1765), novelist and story writer
- Mark Ridley (1560 – c. 1624), lexicographer of Russian
- Nicholas Ridley (1500–1555), theologian and bishop
- Philip Ridley (born 1964), playwright and children's writer
- D. C. H. Rieu (1916–2008), scholar and translator
- E. V. Rieu (1887–1972), scholar, translator and poet
- Denise Riley (born 1948), poet and scholar
- Gwendoline Riley (born 1979), novelist
- Peter Riley (born 1940), poet and essayist
- Stella Rimington (born 1935), novelist and intelligence officer
- James Riordan (1936–2012), children's writer and footballer
- Jonathan Ripley, writer, director and producer
- Anne Isabella Thackeray Ritchie (1837–1919), novelist and essayist
- James Ewing Ritchie (1820–1898), travel writer and political biographer
- Joseph Ritson (1752–1803), antiquary and editor
- Graham Robb (born 1958), biographer and critic
- Andrew Roberts (born 1963), historian and biographer
- David Roberts (living), novelist and editor
- Emma Roberts (1794–1840), travel writer and poet
- Katherine Roberts (born 1962), children's writer
- Keith Roberts (1935–2000), novelist and story writer
- Lynette Roberts (born Evelyn Beatrice Roberts, 1909–1995), poet
- Michael Roberts (1902–1948), poet and critic
- Michael Symmons Roberts (born 1963), poet and librettist
- Michèle Roberts (born 1949), novelist and poet
- Morley Roberts (1857–1942), novelist
- Joseph Clinton Robertson (wrote as Sholto Percy, 1788–1852), writer and editor
- Thomas William Robertson (1829–1871), playwright
- Denise Robins (several pen names, 1897–1985), novelist
- Patricia Robins (also as Claire Lorrimer, 1921–2016), novelist
- Austin Robinson (1897–1993), economist
- Derek Robinson (born 1932), novelist
- Henry Crabb Robinson (1775–1867), man of letters
- Hilary Robinson (born 1962), children's writer
- Joan Robinson (1903–1983), economist
- John Robinson (1919–1983), writer and bishop Honest to God
- Mary Robinson (1757–1800), poet and novelist
- Nigel Robinson (living), writer and editor
- Peter Robinson (born 1953), poet and translator
- Rony Robinson (born 1940), novelist and playwright
- John Roby (1793–1850), poet and writer
- Paul Roche (1916–2007), poet, novelist and critic
- Regina Maria Roche (1764–1845), Gothic novelist
- Rennell Rodd (1858–1941), poet and politician
- John Rodker (1894–1955), writer and poet
- Jane Rogers (born 1952), novelist
- Samuel Rogers (1763–1855), poet
- Thorold Rogers (1823–1890), political economist
- Woodes Rogers (died 1732), travel writer and mariner
- Peter Mark Roget (1779–1869), philologist, Roget's Thesaurus
- Sax Rohmer (real name A. H. S. Ward, 1883–1959), novelist
- Frederick Rolfe (1860–1913), novelist and artist
- Richard Rolle (1290–1349), writer and Bible translator
- L. T. C. Rolt (1910–1974), transport writer
- Isabella Frances Romer (1798–1852), travel writer
- Stephen Romer (born 1957), poet and critic
- William Roscoe (1753–1831), scholar and poet
- Elizabeth and Gerald Rose (latter, 1935–2023), children's writers and illustrators
- Paul Rose (1935–2015), writer and politician
- Michael Rosen (born 1946), children's writer and poet
- Isaac Rosenberg (1890–1918), poet and playwright
- Jack Rosenthal (1931–2004), screenwriter
- Alan Ross (1922–2001), poet, writer and editor
- Christina Rossetti (1830–1894), poet
- Dante Gabriel Rossetti (1828–1882), poet and painter
- Maria Francesca Rossetti (1827–1876), writer and translator
- William Michael Rossetti (1829–1919), writer and critic
- John Horace Round (1854–1928), historian and genealogist
- W. H. D. Rouse (1863–1950), classicist and editor
- Martin Routh (1755–1854), classicist
- Alick Rowe (1939–2009), scriptwriter and novelist
- Elizabeth Singer Rowe (1674–1737), poet and novelist
- Nicholas Rowe (1674–1718), Poet Laureate
- Richard Rowlands (c. 1550–1640), historian and antiquary
- Samuel Rowlands (c. 1573–1630), poet and pamphleteer
- Samuel Rowley (died c. 1633), playwright and actor
- William Rowley (c. 1585–1626), playwright and actor
- J. K. Rowling (born 1965), children's writer, Harry Potter
- Lucinda Roy (born 1955), novelist and poet
- Gillian Rubinstein (also as Lian Hearn, born 1942), children's writer and playwright
- Carol Rumens (born 1944), poet and scholar
- Katherine Rundell (born 1987), children's writer, playwright and academic
- Peter Rushforth (1945–2005), novelist
- John Ruskin (1819–1900), essayist, poet and art critic
- Bertrand Russell (1872–1970), philosopher What I Believe
- Lord John Russell (1792–1878), biographer and prime minister
- William Clark Russell (1844–1911), novelist
- William Howard Russell (1820–1907), travel writer and war correspondent
- John D. Rutherford (born 1941), scholar and translator
- Edward Rutherfurd (born 1948), historical fiction author
- Cecil Bernard Rutley, (1888–1956), children's and science fiction
- Chris Ryan (born 1961), novelist and soldier
- Amy Louisa Rye (1851–unknown), children's writer and social reformer
- Gilbert Ryle (1900–1976), philosopher
- Thomas Rymer (c. 1643–1713), Historiographer Royal and poet
- Royce Ryton (1924–2009), playwright

== S ==
- Suhayl Saadi (born 1961), novelist, playwright and physician
- Oliver Sacks (1933–2015), writer and neurologist
- Charles Sackville, Earl of Dorset (1638–1706), poet
- Lady Margaret Sackville (1881–1963), poet and children's writer
- Thomas Sackville, Earl of Dorset (1536–1608), poet and statesman
- Vita Sackville-West (1892–1962), poet and novelist All Passion Spent
- Lorna Sage (1943–2001), critic and scholar
- Lawrence Sail (born 1942), poet and editor
- George Saintsbury (1845–1933), critic
- Saki (real name Hector Hugh Munro) (1870–1916), story writer and satirist
- Anbara Salam, historical fiction writer
- Henry Stephens Salt (1851–1939), writer and campaigner
- John Saltmarsh (died 1647), writer and cleric
- Fiona Sampson (born 1968), poet and editor
- Kevin Sampson (born 1961), novelist
- Ignatius Sancho (c. 1729–1780), writer and domestic servant
- Nicholas Sanders (c. 1530–1581), polemicist and RC priest
- Robert Sanderson (1587–1663), theologian
- Edwin Sandys (1519–1588), Bishops' Bible translator and bishop
- George Sandys (1577–1644), poet and traveller
- Peter Sanger (born 1943), poet and scholar
- C. J. Sansom (1952–2024), novelist
- Clive Sansom (1910–1981), poet, playwright and educator
- William Sansom (1912–1976), novelist and travel writer
- Siegfried Sassoon (1886–1967), poet and novelist Memoirs of a Fox-Hunting Man
- Hilary Saint George Saunders (wrote as Francis Beeding, etc., 1898–1951), novelist
- James Savage (1767–1845), writer and antiquary
- Richard Savage (c. 1697–1743), poet and satirist
- Henry Savile (1549–1622), scholar and AV translator
- Michael Saward (1932–2015), hymnist
- Dorothy L. Sayers (1893–1957), novelist, Lord Peter Wimsey
- Frank Sayers (1763–1817), poet and metaphysician
- Arthur Scaife (c. 1855-1934), writer and editor
- Francis Scarfe (1911–1986), poet and novelist
- Vernon Scannell (1922–2007), poet
- Alex Scarrow (living), novelist and screenwriter
- Simon Scarrow (born 1962), historical novelist
- Simon Schama (born 1945), historian
- Ann Schlee (1934–2023), novelist
- Caroline Lucy Scott (1784–1857), novelist and religious writer
- Catherine Amy Dawson Scott (1865–1934), poet, playwright and novelist
- Geoffrey Scott (1884–1929), writer and poet
- Hardiman Scott (1920–1999), writer and poet
- Hugh Stowell Scott (wrote as Henry Seton Merriman, c. 1863–1903), novelist
- Jane Scott (1779–1839), playwright
- John Scott (1783–1821), editor and writer
- John Scott of Amwell (1731–1783), poet
- John A. Scott (born 1948), poet and novelist
- Mary Scott (1751/1752–1793), poet
- Paul Mark Scott (1920–1978), novelist, playwright and poet
- Sarah Scott (1720–1795), novelist and translator
- William Bell Scott (1811–1890), poet and artist
- Will Scott (1893−1964), crime writer and playwright
- Anne Scott-James (1913–2009), novelist, editor and garden writer
- E. J. Scovell (1907–1999), poet
- James Scudamore (born 1976), novelist
- George Bazeley Scurfield (1920–1991), poet, novelist and politician
- Marcus Sedgwick (born 1968), children's writer
- Charles Sedley (1639–1701), poet and rake
- Kate Sedley (real name Brenda Clarke, 1926–2022), novelist
- Stephen Sedley (b. 1939), writer on law
- Frederic Seebohm (1833–1912), economic historian
- John Robert Seeley (1834–1895), historian and essayist
- Rachel Seiffert (born 1971), novelist
- David Selbourne (born 1937), philosopher and playwright
- Catherine Selden (fl. 1797–1817), novelist
- John Selden (1584–1654), polymath
- Will Self (born 1961), novelist and columnist
- Charles Seltman (1886–1957), art historian
- George Selwyn (1719–1791), correspondent and wit
- Nassau William Senior (1790–1864), economist
- Sepharial (real name Walter Gorn Old, 1864–1929), astrologer and numerologist
- Gitta Sereny (1921–2012), biographer and historian
- Ian Serraillier (1912–1994), novelist and poet
- Robert Service (born 1947), historian and scholar
- Diane Setterfield (born 1964), novelist
- Elkanah Settle (1648–1724), playwright and poet
- Tim Severin (1940–2020), writer, historian and explorer
- Anna Seward ("Swan of Lichfield", 1747–1809), poet and biographer
- Thomas Seward (1708–1790), writer
- William Seward (1747–1799), anecdotist
- Anna Sewell (1820–1878), novelist, Black Beauty
- Elizabeth Missing Sewell (1815–1906), novelist and religious writer
- Mary Wright Sewell (1797–1884), children's writer
- William Sewell (1804–1874), writer, translator and cleric
- Miranda Seymour (born 1948), biographer, novelist and children's writer
- Martin Seymour-Smith (1928–1998), poet and critic
- Thomas Shadwell (c. 1642–1692), Poet Laureate, Historiographer Royal and playwright
- Anthony Shaffer (1926–2001), playwright and novelist
- Peter Shaffer (1926–2016), playwright Amadeus
- Eddy Shah (born 1944), novelist and newspaper owner
- Saira Shah (born 1964), writer and film-maker
- Tahir Shah (born 1966), travel writer and critic
- Olivia Shakespear (1863–1938), novelist and playwright
- Nicholas Shakespeare (born 1957), novelist and biographer
- William Shakespeare (c. 1564–1616), poet and playwright Hamlet
- Edward Shanks (1892–1953), poet and critic
- Jo Shapcott (born 1953), poet and scholar
- Evelyn Sharp (1869–1955), journalist, children's writer and suffragist
- Jane Sharp (c. 1641–c. 1671), writer on midwifery
- Margery Sharp (1905–1991), novelist, children's writer and playwright
- Richard Sharp (1759–1835), polemicist and hatter
- Thomas Wilfred Sharp (1901–1978), writer on planning
- Kevin Sharpe (1949–2011), historian
- Richard Sharpe (living), historian
- Richard Bowdler Sharpe (1847–1909), ornithologist and editor
- Tom Sharpe (1928–2013), novelist
- George Shaw (1751–1813), botanist and zoologist
- Pete Shaw (born 1966), writer and producer
- Peter Shaw (1694–1763), physician, medical writer and translator
- Robert Shaw (1927–1978), actor and novelist
- Watkins Shaw (1911–1996), musicologist
- John Shebbeare (1709–1788), novelist and satirist
- Wilfrid Sheed (1930–2011), writer, novelist and essayist
- John Sheffield (also as Mulgrave, then Buckingham, 1647–1721) poet and essayist
- Edward Sheldon (1599–1687), religious translator
- Mary Shelley (1797–1851), author, Frankenstein
- Percy Bysshe Shelley (1792–1822), poet Ode to the West Wind
- George Shelvocke (1675–1742), travel writer
- William Shenstone (1714–1763), poet
- Stav Sherez (born 1970), novelist
- Clare Sheridan (1885–1970), writer and sculptor
- Richard Brinsley Sheridan (1751–1816), playwright, The Rivals
- William Sherlock (1641–1707), theologian and cleric
- Philip Sherrard (1922–1995), classicist, translator and religious writer
- R. C. Sherriff (1890–1975), playwright, novelist and screenwriter Journey's End
- Charles Scott Sherrington (1857–1952), science writer and Nobel Prize winner
- Norman Sherry (1935–2016), novelist and biographer
- Mary Martha Sherwood (1775–1851), children's writer and tractarian
- James Shirley (1596–1666), playwright
- Joseph Henry Shorthouse (1834–1903), novelist
- Fredegond Shove (1889–1949), poet
- Nevil Shute (1899–1960), novelist and aviation engineer A Town Like Alice
- Penelope Shuttle (born 1947), poet and novelist
- Gareth Sibson (born 1977), novelist and broadcaster
- Elizabeth Siddal (1829–1862), artist and poet
- Ethel Sidgwick (1877–1970), novelist, poet, playwright, translator, biographer and peace activist
- Mary Sidney (later Mary Herbert, countess of Pembroke, 1561–1621), poet and translator
- Philip Sidney (1554–1586), poet and soldier
- Robert Sidney, earl of Leicester (1563–1626) poet and statesman
- Una Lucy Silberrad (1872–1955), novelist
- Jon Silkin (1930–1997), poet, editor and critic
- Alan Sillitoe (1928–2010), novelist, poet and translator Saturday Night and Sunday Morning
- Elizabeth Simcoe (1762–1850), diarist
- George Augustus Simcox (1841–1905), poet and scholar
- Kathryn Simmonds (born 1972), poet and story writer
- Jack Simmons (1915–2000), historian
- Brian Simon (1915–2002), educator
- David Simpson (1745–1799), writer and cleric
- Dorothy Simpson (1933–2020), novelist
- Helen Simpson (born 1959), novelist and story writer
- Joe Simpson (born 1960), writer and mountaineer
- John Simpson (1746–1812), writer and Unitarian minister
- John Simpson (born 1953), lexicographer
- John Palgrave Simpson (1807–1887), playwright
- N. F. Simpson (1919–2011), playwright
- George Robert Sims (1847–1922), writer, poet and journalist
- Andrew Sinclair (1935–2019), novelist, historian and biographer
- Clive Sinclair (1940–2021), novelist
- Ian Sinclair writer, poet and film-maker
- May Sinclair (real name Mary Amelia St. Clair, 1863–1946), novelist, poet and critic
- C. H. Sisson (1914–2003), poet, translator and writer
- Edith Sitwell (1887–1964), poet
- Osbert Sitwell (1892–1969), writer
- Sacheverell Sitwell (1897–1988), poet and writer
- Walter William Skeat (1835–1912), philologist
- Barbara Skelton (1916–1996), novelist and memoirist
- John Skelton (c. 1460–1529), poet and satirist
- Robert Skidelsky (born 1939), economic historian and biographer
- Joseph Skipsey (1832–1903), poet and editor
- G. E. M. Skues (1858–1949), fishing writer
- Eleanor Sleath (1770–1847), Gothic novelist
- Barbara Sleigh (1906–1982), children's writer Carbonel series
- Edward Slow (1841–1925), dialect poet
- Carolyn Smart (born 1952), poet
- Christopher Smart (1722–1771), poet
- Francis Edward Smedley (1818–1864), novelist
- Menella Bute Smedley (1819–1877), novelist, poet and translator
- Albert Richard Smith (1816–1860), writer and mountaineer
- C. Fox Smith (1882–1954), poet and nautical and children's writer
- Charlotte Smith (1749–1806), poet and novelist
- Charlotte Fell Smith (1851–1937) historian and biographer
- David Smith (born 1963), historian
- Dodie Smith (1896–1990), novelist and playwright, The Hundred and One Dalmatians
- Edmund Smith (1672–1710), poet and translator
- Eleanor Smith (1902–1945), novelist
- Emma Smith (1923–2018), novelist and children's writer
- Georgina Castle Smith (1845–1933), children's writer and novelist
- Horace Smith (originally Horatio Smith, 1779–1849), novelist and poet
- Joan Smith (born 1953), novelist and journalist
- John Frederick Smith (1806–1890), novelist
- Ken Smith (1938–2003), poet
- Michael Marshall Smith (born 1965), novelist and screenwriter
- Miles Smith (1554–1624), scholar, AV translator and cleric
- Sid Smith (born 1949), novelist and journalist
- Stevie Smith (1902–1971), poet and novelist
- Sydney Smith (1771–1845), writer and cleric
- Thomas Smith (fl. 1600–1627), writer and soldier
- Tom Rob Smith (born 1979), novelist
- Wentworth Smith (1571 – c. 1623), playwright
- William Smith (fl. 1590s), poet
- William Smith (1769–1839), geologist
- William Smith (1813–1893), lexicographer
- Zadie Smith (born 1975), novelist
- Frank Smythe (1900–1949), writer and mountaineer
- Percy Smythe (1826–1869), man of letters
- C. P. Snow (1905–1980), novelist and physicist Strangers and Brothers
- John Snow (born 1941), poet, autobiographer and first-class cricketer
- William Somervile (1675–1742), poet
- Charles Sorley (1895–1915), poet
- William Sotheby (1757–1833), poet and translator
- Ahdaf Soueif (born 1950), novelist and translator
- Robert South (1634–1716), theologian and cleric
- Joanna Southcott (1750–1814), religious writer
- R. W. Southern (1912–2001), historian
- Caroline Anne Southey (1786–1854), poet
- Robert Southey (1774–1843), Poet Laureate
- Robert Southwell (1561–1595), poet, tractarian and martyr
- Stephen Southwold (1887–1964), novelist and children's writer
- Nancy Spain (1917–1964), novelist, biographer and journalist
- Robert Spaulding (fl. 1610s), scholar, AV translator and cleric
- Rachel Speght (1596-16??), poet and polemicist
- Henry Spelman (c. 1562–1641), historian and antiquary
- Bernard Spencer (1909–1963), poet
- Colin Spencer (1933–2023), writer, artist and broadcaster
- Herbert Spencer (1820–1903), philosopher
- John Spencer (1630–1693), scholar and cleric
- William Robert Spencer (1769–1834), poet and wit
- Emily Spender (1841–1922), novelist and suffragette
- Lillian Spender (1835–1895), novelist and essayist
- Stephen Spender (1909–1995), poet, novelist and travel writer
- Edmund Spenser (c. 1552–1599), poet, The Faerie Queene
- John Spenser (1559–1614), scholar, AV translator and cleric
- Dennis Spooner (1932–1986), TV screenwriter
- William Archibald Spooner (1844–1930), scholar, spoonerisms
- Jean Sprackland (born 1962), poet
- Francis Spufford (born 1964), writer
- Charles Spurgeon (1834–1892), writer and Baptist minister
- J. C. Squire (1884–1958), poet and historian
- Edward St Aubyn (born 1960), novelist and journalist
- Bayle St. John (1822–1859), travel writer and biographer
- Henry St John, Lord Bolingbroke (1678–1751) politician and philosopher
- James Augustus St. John (born James John, 1795–1875), journalist, writer and traveller
- Spenser St. John (1825–1910), biographer, travel writer and diplomat
- Brian Stableford (1948–2024), SF writer
- Tom Stacey (1930–2022), novelist, writer and publisher
- David A. T. Stafford (born 1942), historian
- Julian Stallabrass (living), art historian
- Jon Stallworthy (1935–2014), scholar and poet
- John Stammers (born 1954), poet
- Josiah Stamp (1880–1941), economist and banker
- Derek Stanford (1918–2008), biographer and poet
- Louisa Stanhope (fl. 1806–1827), novelist
- Philip Stanhope, Lord Chesterfield, (1694–1773) politician and writer
- Arthur Stanley (1815–1881), theologian and cleric
- Thomas Stanley (1625–1678), poet and philosopher
- Andy Stanton (living), children's writer,
- Olaf Stapledon (1886–1950), philosopher and novelist
- Robert Stapylton (died 1669), playwright, poet and translator
- Freya Stark (1893–1993), travel writer
- Mariana Starke (1761/1762–1838), travel writer, poet and playwright
- David Starkey (b. 1945), historian
- Boris Starling (living), novelist and screenwriter
- William Thomas Stead (1849–1912), campaigner
- Michael Steed (1940–2023), political scientist and broadcaster
- Wickham Steed (1871–1856), journalist and historian
- Anne Steele (wrote as Theodosia, 1717–1778), hymnist
- David Ramsay Steele (living), philosopher
- Jonathan Steele (living), writer and journalist
- Marguerite Steen (1894–1975), novelist and biographer
- George Steevens (1736–1800), Shakespearean scholar
- James Kenneth Stephen (1859–1892), poet
- Leslie Stephen (1832–1904), writer and mountaineer
- Frederic George Stephens (1828–1907), art critic
- Henry Pottinger Stephens (1851–1903), playwright and novelist
- James Francis Stephens (1792–1852), entomologist
- Robert Stephens (1665–1732), Historiographer Royal
- Simon Stephens (born 1971), playwright
- G. B. Stern (1890–1973), novelist, playwright and biographer
- Laurence Sterne (1713–1768), novelist and cleric, Tristram Shandy
- George Alexander Stevens (1710–1780), playwright, poet and actor
- Matthew Stevenson (died 1654), poet
- William Stevenson (1530–1575), poet and playwright
- Angus Stewart (1936–1998) novelist, diarist and poet
- John "Walking" Stewart (1747–1822), philosopher and traveller
- Mary Stewart (1916–2014), novelist
- William Stobbs (1914–2000), children's writer and illustrator
- Julian Stockwin (born 1944), novelist
- Sewell Stokes (1902–1979), novelist, biographer and playwright
- Nick Stone (born 1966), novelist
- Samuel John Stone (1839–1900), hymnist and cleric
- David Lee Stone (born 1978), children's writer
- David Storey (1933–2017), novelist and playwright
- Catherine Storr (1913–2001), children's writer
- Thomas Story (c. 1670–1742), writer and Quaker
- John Stow (c. 1525–1605), historian and antiquary
- Herbert Strang (pseudonym of George Herbert Ely, 1866–1958, and Charles James L'Estrange, 1867–1947), children's writers
- Alix Strachey (1892–1973), psychoanalyst and translator
- James Strachey (1887–1967), psychoanalyst and editor
- Julia Strachey (1901–1979), novelist
- Lytton Strachey (1880–1932), biographer and critic, Eminent Victorians
- Ray Strachey (originally Rachel Costelloe, 1887–1940), biographer and campaigner
- Paul Strathern (born 1940), novelist and scholar
- Noel Streatfeild (1895–1986), children's writer Ballet Shoes
- A. G. Street (1892–1966), writer and broadcaster
- Cecil Street (also as John Rhode, Miles Burton etc., 1884–1965), novelist
- Joe Stretch (born 1982), novelist
- Hesba Stretton (real name Sarah Smith, 1832–1911), novelist and children's writer
- Agnes Strickland (1796–1874), historian, poet and children's writer
- William Strode (1600–1643), poet
- Leonard Strong (wrote as L. A. G. Strong, 1896–1958), novelist, poet and children's writer
- Jan Struther (real name Joyce Anstruther, (1901–1953), novelist and hymnist
- John Strype (1643–1737), historian, biographer and cleric
- Alexander Stuart (living), novelist and screenwriter
- Muriel Stuart (1885–1967), poet and garden writer
- John Stubbs or Stubbe (c. 1543–1591), pamphleteer
- John Studley (c. 1545 – c. 1590), translator
- Joseph Sturge (1793–1859) abolitionist writer and campaigner
- Howard Sturgis (1855–1920), novelist
- Julian Sturgis (1848–1904), novelist and poet
- George Sturt (also as George Bourne, 1863–1927), country writer
- John Strype (1643–1737), historian and biographer
- Showell Styles (1908–2005), novelist and children's writer
- John Suckling (1609–1642), poet
- J. W. N. Sullivan (1886–1937), science writer
- Montague Summers (1880–1948), writer and occultist
- Kate Summerscale (born 1965), writer and journalist
- Robert Smith Surtees (1805–1864), novelist
- Alice Sutcliffe (fl. 1624–1634), religious writer
- William Sutcliffe (born 1971), novelist
- Alfred Sutro (1863–1933), playwright and translator
- E. W. Swanton (1907–2000), cricket writer and broadcaster
- Deborah Swift (born 1955), historical fiction, also writes as Davina Blake
- Graham Swift (born 1949), novelist
- Algernon Charles Swinburne (1837–1909), poet
- Robert Swindells (born 1939), children's writer
- Randall Swingler (1909–1967), poet
- Frank Swinnerton (1884–1982), novelist and editor
- Christopher Sykes (1907–1986), travel writer and biographer
- Percy Sykes (1867–1945), travel writer and historian
- Joshua Sylvester (1563–1618), poet
- John Addington Symonds (1840–1893), poet and critic
- A. J. A. Symons (1900–1941), writer and bibliographer
- Arthur Symons (1865–1945), poet and essayist
- Julian Symons (1912–1994), crime writer and poet
- Mitchell Symons (born 1957), writer and journalist
- George Szirtes (born 1948), poet and translator

== T ==
- Thomas Noon Talfourd (1795–1854), writer, playwright and lawyer
- Derek Tangye (1912–1996), writer
- Nigel Tangye (1909–1988), writer and flying instructor
- Heather Tanner (1903–1993), countryside writer
- James T. Tanner (1858–1915), playwright and director
- Thomas Tanner (1630–1682), writer and cleric
- Thomas Tanner (1674–1735), antiquary and bishop
- Theaurau John Tany (originally Thomas Totney, 1608–1659), religious writer
- Kim Taplin (1943-2024), English poet
- Emma Tatham (1829–1855), poet
- John Tatham (fl. 1632–64), playwright and poet
- Jemima von Tautphoeus (born Jemima Montgomery, 1807–1893), novelist
- R. H. Tawney (1880–1962), economic historian
- A. J. P. Taylor (1906–1990), historian
- Andrew Taylor (born 1951), novelist
- Ann Taylor (1782–1866), poet and children's writer
- D. J. Taylor (born 1960), novelist and biographer
- Edgar Taylor (1793–1839), writer and translator
- Elizabeth Taylor (1912–1975), novelist
- Emily Taylor (1795–1872), writer, poet and hymnist
- G. P. Taylor (born 1958), novelist and cleric
- Henry Taylor (1711–1785), polemicist and cleric
- Henry Taylor (1800–1886), playwright
- Isaac Taylor (1787–1865), scholar, cleric and inventor
- Jane Taylor (1783–1824), children's poet and novelist
- Jeremy Taylor (1613–1667), religious writer
- John Taylor (1703–1772), autobiographer
- John Taylor (the "Water Poet", 1578–1653), poet
- John Taylor (1750–1826), poet and hymnist
- Philip Meadows Taylor (1808–1876), novelist
- Richard Taylor (1782–1858), naturalist and editor
- Sean Taylor (living), children's writer
- Thomas Taylor (1758–1835), translator
- Tom Taylor (1817–1880), playwright and editor
- William Taylor (died 1423), Lollard theologian
- William Taylor (1765–1836), scholar and translator
- Roma Tearne (born 1954), novelist
- Barry Tebb (born 1942), poet and anthologist
- Mrs. Bartle Teeling (1851–1906), non-fiction writer and novelist
- William Temple (1555–1627), logician
- William Temple (1628–1699), essayist and statesman
- William Temple (1881–1944), writer and archbishop
- William F. Temple (1914–1989), SF writer
- Edward Tennant (1897–1916), poet
- Emma Tennant (1937–2017), novelist
- Alfred, Lord Tennyson (1809–1892), Poet Laureate, The Charge of the Light Brigade
- Frederick Tennyson (1807–1898), poet
- Henry Teonge (c. 1620–1690), diarist and naval chaplain
- Lisa St Aubin de Terán (born 1953), novelist and memoirist
- J. E. Harold Terry (1885–1939), novelist, playwright and critic
- A. S. J. Tessimond (1902–1962), poet
- Anne Isabella Thackeray, Lady Ritchie (1837–1919), novelist and essayist
- William Makepeace Thackeray (1811–1863), novelist, Vanity Fair
- Algernon Sydney Thelwall (1795–1863), writer and cleric
- John Thelwall (1764–1834), poet and writer
- Sydney Thelwall (1834–1922), scholar, translator and cleric
- Lewis Theobald (1688–1744), scholar, critic and translator
- Marcel Theroux (born 1968), novelist and broadcaster
- Philip Thicknesse (1719–1792), writer
- Angela Thirkell (1890–1961), novelist
- Connop Thirlwall (1797–1875), historian, translator and bishop
- Adam Thirlwell (born 1978), novelist
- William Turner Thiselton-Dyer (1843–1926), botanist
- D. M. Thomas (1935–2023), novelist, poet and translator
- David St John Thomas (1929–2014), writer
- Donald Serrell Thomas (also as Francis Selwyn, 1934–2022), novelist, biographer and poet
- Edward Thomas (1878–1917), poet
- Edward J. Thomas (1869–1958), historian of Buddhism and librarian
- Elizabeth Thomas (1675–1731), poet
- Elizabeth Thomas (wrote as Mrs Bridget Bluemantle and Mrs Martha Homely, 1770/1771–1855), novelist and poet
- Hugh Thomas (1931–2017), historian
- Scarlett Thomas (born 1972), novelist
- W. Ian Thomas (1914–2007), writer and missionary
- John Thomlinson (1692–1761), diarist and cleric
- Edward Healy Thompson (1813–1891), religious writer and editor
- Flora Thompson (1876–1947), novelist and poet, Lark Rise to Candleford
- Francis Thompson (1859–1907), poet
- Harry Thompson (1960–2005), biographer, novelist and TV producer
- James Thompson (1817–1877), journalist and historian
- Kate Thompson (born 1956), novelist and children's writer
- Thomas Thompson (1880–1951), fiction and non-fiction writer
- William Thompson (c. 1712 – c. 1766), poet
- William Thoms (1803–1885), antiquary and miscellanist
- A. A. Thomson (1894–1968), cricket and travel writer
- Giles Thomson (1553–1612), scholar, AV translator and cleric
- Jamie Thomson (born 1958), novelist and children's writer
- Katherine Thomson (also as Mrs Thomson and Grace Wharton, 1797–1862), novelist and historian
- Richard Thomson (fl. 1600s), scholar, AV translator and cleric
- Rupert Thomson (born 1955), novelist and memoirist
- Wilfrid Thorley (1878–1963), poet and educator
- George Walter Thornbury (1828–1876), poet, novelist and travel writer
- Guy Thorne (real name C. Ranger Gull, 1876–1923), novelist
- Matt Thorne (born 1974), novelist and children's writer
- William Thorne (c. 1568–1630), orientalist, AV translator and cleric
- Bonnell Thornton (1725–1768), poet, essayist and critic
- Robert John Thornton (1768–1837), botanist and physician
- Tim Thornton (born 1973), novelist and musician
- Adam Thorpe (born 1956), poet and novelist
- Kay Thorpe (living), romantic novelist
- Ralph Thoresby (1658–1725), antiquary and diarist
- Hester Thrale (also as Mrs. Piozzi, 1741–1821), diarist and biographer,
- Colin Thubron (born 1939), travel writer and novelist
- Edward Thurlow, Lord Thurlow (1731–1806), poet and lord chancellor
- E. Temple Thurston (1879–1933), playwright, poet and novelist
- Joseph Thurston (1704–1732), poet
- Ann Thwaite (born 1932), biographer
- Anthony Thwaite (1930–2021), poet and writer
- Annie O. Tibbits (1871–1957), journalist, novelist, and short story writer
- Charles John Tibbits (1861–1935), journalist, newspaper editor, author, and legal writer
- Chidiock Tichborne (1558–1586), poet and conspirator
- Thomas Tickell (1686–1740), poet
- Robert Tighe (died 1620), AV translator and cleric
- Terence Tiller (1916–1987), poet and radio producer
- E. M. W. Tillyard (1889–1962), classicist and literary critic
- Stella Tillyard (born 1957), historian and novelist
- John Timbs (also as Horace Welby, 1801–1875), writer and antiquary
- William M. Timlin (1892–1943), writer and illustrator
- Gillian Tindall (living), historian and novelist
- Peter Tinniswood (1936–2003), novelist and scriptwriter
- John Tobin (1770–1804), playwright
- Barbara Euphan Todd (1890–1976), novelist and children's writer
- H. E. Todd (1908–1988), children's writer
- Malcolm Todd (1939–2013), historian
- J. R. R. Tolkien (1892–1973), fantasy writer and scholar, The Lord of the Rings
- Simon Tolkien (born 1959), novelist and barrister
- Elizabeth Tollet (1694–1754), poet
- Francis Tolson (died 1745), poet
- Thomas Tomkis (c. 1580–1634), playwright
- Claire Tomalin (born 1933), biographer
- Charles Tomlinson (1927–2015), poet and translator
- H. M. Tomlinson, (1873–1958), travel writer, novelist and journalist
- Theresa Tomlinson (born 1946), children's writer
- Rosemary Tonks (1932–2014), poet and novelist
- Charlotte Elizabeth Tonna (pen name Charlotte Elizabeth, 1790–1846), tractarian and novelist
- John Horne Tooke (1736–1812), philologist and politician
- Rebecca Tope (living), crime writer and journalist
- Augustus Montague Toplady (1740–1778), theologian and hymnist
- Angela Topping (born 1954), poet and critic
- Paul Torday (1946–2013), novelist
- Chris Torrance (1941–2021), poet and musician
- Richard Tottel (died 1594), miscellanist
- Cyril Tourneur (1575–1626), playwright
- Nigel Tourneur (fl. 1898), writer
- Doreen Tovey (1918–2008), writer
- Peter Townend (1935–1999), writer and journalist
- John Rowe Townsend (1922–2014), children's writer and scholar
- Joseph Townsend (1739–1816), economist, physician and cleric
- Peter Townsend (1928–2009), sociologist and economist
- Sue Townsend (1946–2014), novelist, Adrian Mole books
- Tom Townsend (born 1971), writer and bridge player
- Aurelian Townshend (1583–1643), poet and playwright
- Charles Townshend (born 1945), historian
- Chauncy Hare Townshend (1798–1868), poet and cleric
- Thomas Townson (1715–1792), writer and cleric
- Arnold Toynbee (1852–1883), economic historian
- Arnold J. Toynbee (1889–1975), historian
- Philip Toynbee (1916–1981), novelist, poet and journalist
- Polly Toynbee (born 1946), journalist and writer
- John Tradescant the Younger (1608–1662), botanist and antiquary
- Hannah Trager (1870-1943), writer and activist
- Thomas Traherne (1636/1637–1674), poet and religious writer
- Henry Duff Traill (1842–1900), humorist, editor and biographer
- Anna Trapnell (fl. 1650s), religious writer
- Ben Travers (1886–1980), playwright and novelist
- Karen Traviss (living), novelist
- Mary Treadgold (1910–2005), children's writer
- Geoffrey Trease (1909–1998), children's writer
- Miles Tredinnick (born 1955), playwright, screenwriter and singer
- Iris Tree (1897–1968), poet and actress
- Viola Tree (1884–1938), writer and actress
- Henry Treece (1911–1966), poet, novelist and children's writer
- Edward John Trelawny (1792–1881), biographer and novelist
- Rose Tremain (born 1943), novelist
- Kate Tremayne (living), novelist
- Rex Tremlett (1903–1986), writer and broadcaster
- Francis Chenevix Trench (1805–1886), writer and cleric
- Richard Chenevix Trench (1807–1886), philologist, poet and archbishop
- Christopher Trent, author of Motoring Holidays in Britain
- Robert Tressell or Tressall (originally Robert Croker, later Noonan, 1870–1911), novelist, The Ragged Trousered Philanthropists
- G. M. Trevelyan (1876–1962), historian
- George Trevelyan (1838–1928), writer and statesman
- R. C. Trevelyan (1872–1951), poet and translator
- Raleigh Trevelyan (1923–2014), historian
- John Trevisa (1342–1402), translator
- Elleston Trevor (originally Trevor Dudley-Smith, also as Adam Hall etc., 1920–1995), novelist
- Rachel Trickett (1923–1999), novelist and scholar
- Jonathan Trigell (born 1974), novelist
- Sarah Trimmer (1741–1810), children's writer
- Henry Baker Tristram (1822–1906), travel writer, naturalist and cleric
- Anthony Trollope (1815–1882), novelist, Chronicles of Barsetshire
- Frances Trollope (1780–1863), novelist and travel writer
- Joanna Trollope (also as Caroline Harvey, 1943–2025), novelist
- Thomas Adolphus Trollope (1810–1892), travel writer and novelist
- Thomas Trotter (1760–1832), physician and medical writer
- Peter Trower (1930–2017), poet and novelist
- Thomas Tryon (1634–1703), writer and vegetarian
- Edwin Charles Tubb (several pen names, 1919–2010), novelist
- Abraham Tucker (wrote as Edward Search, 1705–1774), philosopher
- Charlotte Maria Tucker (wrote as A.L.O.E, 1821–1893), children's writer
- Cuthbert Tunstall or Tonstall (1474–1559), writer and bishop
- Martin Farquhar Tupper (1810–1889), writer and poet
- George Turberville (c. 1540 – pre–1597), poet
- Charles Tennyson Turner (1808–1879), poet and translator
- David Turner (1927–1990), playwright and scriptwriter
- Ernest Sackville Turner (1909–2006), writer and journalist
- Joe Turner (living), scriptwriter and playwright
- John Frayn Turner (living), military historian
- Matthew Turner (died 1788), philosopher and physician
- Philip Turner (wrote as Stephen Chance, 1925–2006), children's writer and cleric
- Reginald Turner (1869–1938), novelist and aesthete
- Roger Turner (living), garden writer and designer
- Sharon Turner (1768–1847), historian
- Steve Turner (living), poet and biographer
- Thomas Turner (1729–1793), diarist
- Tom Turner (living), garden writer and designer
- Thomas Tusser (1524–1580), poet and farmer
- Ethel Brilliana Tweedie (also as Mrs Alec Tweedie 1862–1940), travel writer
- Robert Twigger (born 1964), writer
- Horace Twiss (c. 1787–1849), writer and politician
- Kenneth Tynan (1927–1980), drama critic and producer
- William Tyndale (1494–1536), scholar and Bible translator
- George Tyrrell (1861–1909), theologian and scholar
- Robert Yelverton Tyrrell (1844–1914), scholar and translator
- Thomas Tyrwhitt (1730–1786), scholar, editor and critic

== U ==
- Nicholas Udall (1505–1556), playwright and translator, Ralph Roister Doister
- Jenny Uglow (born 1947), biographer and critic
- Evelyn Underhill (1875–1941), religious writer and novelist
- Peter Underwood (1923–2014), writer and broadcaster
- Barry Unsworth (1930–2012), novelist
- Cathi Unsworth (living), novelist
- Arthur Upfield (1890–1964), crime writer
- John Upton (1707–1760), editor and critic
- Lawrence Upton (1949–2020), poet and artist
- Edward Upward (1903–2009), novelist and story writer
- Mark Urban (born 1961), military writer
- J. O. Urmson (1915–2012), philosopher
- Thomas Usk (died 1388), poet
- Sarah Elizabeth Utterson (1781–1851), gothic short story writer
- Alison Uttley (1884–1976), children's writer, Little Grey Rabbit

== V ==
- Horace Annesley Vachell (1861–1955), novelist and playwright
- John Van der Kiste (born 1954), writer and polymath
- John Vanbrugh (1664–1726), playwright and architect
- Bernard Vaughan (1847–1922), writer and RC priest
- Keith Vaughan (1912–1977), diarist and artist
- Robert Vaughan (1795–1868), historian, editor and Congregationalist minister
- Llewellyn Vaughan-Lee (born 1953), writer and Sufi mystic
- Thomas Vaux (1510–1556), poet
- Kate Veale, author and illustrator of children's books.
- Frances Vernon (1963–1991), novelist
- Salley Vickers (born 1948), novelist and psychotherapist
- Sherard Vines (1890–1974), poet, novelist and critic
- Elfrida Vipont (real name Elfrida Vipont Foulds, 1902–1992), children's writer
- E. H. Visiak (real name Edward Harold Physick, 1878–1972), poet and novelist
- Ernest Alfred Vizetelly (1853–1922), translator
- Frederick Augustus Voigt (1892–1957), foreign affairs writer

== W ==
- Thomas Wade (1805–1875), poet and playwright
- Lucy Wadham (born 1964), novelist and journalist
- Rekha Waheed (living), novelist
- John Wain (1925–1994), poet and novelist
- Alfred Wainwright (1907–1991), guidebook writer
- Daniel Wakefield (1776–1846), political economist
- Edward Gibbon Wakefield (1796–1862), writer and politician
- Gilbert Wakefield (1756–1801), scholar and polemicist
- H. Russell Wakefield (1890–1964), novelist and story writer
- Priscilla Wakefield (1871–1832), educator and philanthropist
- Robert Wakefield (died 1537), linguist and scholar
- George Waldron (1690 – c. 1730), topographer and poet
- Arthur Waley (1889–1966), orientalist and translator
- Alan Walker (born 1930), biographer, musicologist and broadcaster
- Charles Walker (fl. 1860s), religious writer
- Charles Curwen Walker (1856–1940), Christadelphian writer and editor
- George Walker (c. 1581–1651), writer and cleric
- George Walker (c. 1734–1807), dissenting writer and mathematician
- George Walker (1772–1847), novelist and political writer
- George Walker (1803 – post–1851), chess writer
- Obadiah Walker (1616–1699), scholar and educator
- Ted Walker (1934–2004), poet, dramatist and broadcaster
- Alfred Russel Wallace (1823–1913), naturalist and biologist
- Doreen Wallace (1897–1989), novelist and agricultural writer
- Edgar Wallace (1875–1932), novelist and playwright
- Helen Wallace (born 1946), current affairs writer
- Ian Wallace (living), ornithologist
- John Graham Wallace (born 1966), children's writer and illustrator
- Nick Wallace (born 1972), novelist
- Robert Wallace (1791–1850), writer, biographer and Unitarian minister
- William Wallace (born 1941), scholar and writer on government
- J. M. Wallace-Hadrill (1916–1985), historian
- Edmund Waller (1606–1687), poet
- John Waller (1917–1995), poet and anthologist
- David Walliams (born 1971), children's writer and comedian
- John Wallis (1616–1703), mathematician and writer
- Martin Walls (born 1970), poet and journalist
- Leo Walmsley (1892–1966), novelist and autobiographer
- Horace Walpole (1717–1797), novelist and man of letters, The Castle of Otranto
- Horatio Walpole (1678–1757), writer and politician
- Hugh Walpole (1884–1941), novelist
- Helen Walsh (born 1977), novelist
- Jill Paton Walsh (1937–2020), novelist and children's writer
- John Henry Walsh (also as Stonehenge, 1810–1888), field sports writer
- Sheila Walsh (1928–2009), novelist
- William Walsh (1663–1708), poet and critic
- Guy Walters (born 1971), novelist and journalist
- Hugh Walters (1910–1993), novelist
- Minette Walters (born 1949), novelist
- Vanessa Walters (born 1978), novelist and playwright
- Amy Catherine Walton (1849–1939), children's writer
- Izaak Walton (1593–1683), writer, The Compleat Angler
- William Walwyn (1600–1681), pamphleteer
- Humfrey Wanley (1672–1726), scholar and palaeographer
- Nathaniel Wanley (1634–1680), writer and cleric
- Henry Wansbrough (living), writer, Bible translator and RC monk
- William Warburton (1698–1779), critic and bishop
- Barbara Ward (1914–1981), economist and environmentalist
- Chris Ward (born 1958), playwright
- Edward Ward (1660 or 1667–1731), satirist
- Keith Ward (born 1938), philosopher and cleric
- Mrs. Humphry Ward (born Mary Augusta Arnold, 1851–1920), novelist
- Robert Ward (fl. 1611), AV translator and cleric
- Robert Plumer Ward (1765–1846), lawyer and novelist
- Samuel Ward (1572–1643), scholar, AV translator and cleric
- Sarah Ward (living), novelist and critic
- Seth Ward (1617–1689), polemicist, astronomer and bishop
- Thomas Humphry Ward (1845–1926), writer and journalist
- William George Ward (1812–1882), theologian and mathematician
- Terry Wardle (born 1944), children's author
- Marina Warner (born 1946), novelist and biographer
- Rex Warner (1905–1986), novelist and translator
- Richard Warner (c. 1713–1775), botanist and scholar
- Richard Warner (1763–1853), antiquary and cleric
- Sylvia Townsend Warner (1893–1978), novelist and poet
- William Warner (c. 1558–1609), poet and translator
- Mary Warnock (1924–2019), philosopher
- Blanche Warre-Cornish (1844–1922), novelist and biographer
- John Warren, Lord de Tabley (1835–1895), poet and botanist
- Samuel Warren (1807–1877), novelist and barrister
- Thomas Herbert Warren (1853–1930), scholar and poet
- Tony Warren (1936–2016), screenwriter and novelist
- Joseph Warton (1722–1800), poet and critic
- Thomas Warton (c. 1688–1745), poet
- Thomas Warton (1728–1790), Poet Laureate and critic
- Robin Waterfield (born 1952), translator and classicist
- Andrew Waterhouse (1958–2001), poet and environmentalist
- Ellis Waterhouse (1905–1985), art historian and editor
- Gilbert Waterhouse (1883–1916), poet and architect
- Keith Waterhouse (1929–2009), novelist and screenwriter
- Rachel Waterhouse (1923–2020), historian and activist
- Sarah Waters (born 1966), novelist
- Charles Waterton (1782–1865), naturalist and explorer
- Denys Watkins-Pitchford (wrote as BB, 1905–1990), naturalist and children's writer
- David Watmough (1926–2017), playwright and novelist
- Colin Watson (1920–1983), novelist
- E. L. Grant Watson (1885–1970), writer and biologist
- James Watson (1936–2015), children's writer and playwright
- Richard Watson (1781–1833), Methodist theologian
- Richard Watson (1737–1816), writer and bishop
- Rosamund Marriott Watson (wrote as Graham R. Tomson, 1860–1911), poet and garden writer
- Thomas Watson (1555–1592), poet and translator
- Thomas Watson (c. 1620–1686), writer and preacher
- Victor Watson (born 1936), children's author and academic
- William Watson (1858–1935), poet
- Winifred Watson (1906–2002), novelist
- Alan Watts (1915–1973), philosopher
- Alaric Alexander Watts (1797–1864), poet and editor
- Isaac Watts (1674–1748), hymnist
- Theodore Watts-Dunton (1832–1914), critic, novelist and poet
- Alec Waugh (1898–1981), novelist
- Auberon Waugh (1939–2001), novelist and journalist
- Edwin Waugh (1817–1890), dialect poet
- Evelyn Waugh (1903–1966), novelist, travel writer and diarist, Brideshead Revisited
- Arthur Way (1847–1930), classicist and translator
- Camilla Way (born 1973), novelist and editor
- Adrian Weale (born 1964), military writer
- Frederic Weatherly (1848–1929), lyricist
- Willoughby Weaving (1885–1977), poet
- Clifford Webb (1895–1972), children's writer and illustrator
- Mary Webb (1881–1927), novelist and poet
- Philip Barker Webb (1793–1854), botanist and traveller
- Sidney Webb (1859–1947), and Beatrice Webb (1858–1943), political economists
- Augusta Webster (1837–1894), poet and playwright
- John Webster (c. 1580–1634), playwright, The Duchess of Malfi
- Camilla Wedgwood (1901–1955), anthropologist
- C. V. Wedgwood (1910–1997), historian
- Ernest Weekley (1865–1964), philologist
- Samantha Weinberg (born 1967), novelist and travel writer
- Arabella Weir (born 1957), writer and actor
- Denton Welch (1915–1948), novelist, diarist and artist
- Ronald Welch (real name Ronald Oliver Felton, 1909–1982), novelist and children's writer
- Fay Weldon (1931–2023), novelist and screenwriter
- Dorothy Wellesley (1889–1956), poet and editor
- Charles Jeremiah Wells (c. 1798–1879), poet
- H. G. Wells (1866–1946), novelist and critic, The War of the Worlds
- John Wells (1936–1998), satirist
- Leonard Welsted (1688–1747), poet
- Louise Wener (born 1966), novelist and singer
- Anne Wentworth (1629/1630 – post-1679), religious writer
- Arnold Wesker (1932–2016), playwright
- Charles Wesley (1707–1788), preacher and hymnist
- John Wesley (1703–1791), theologian and cleric
- Mary Wesley (1912–2002), novelist
- Samuel Wesley (1662–1735), poet and polemicist
- Samuel Wesley (1690 or 1691–1739), poet and cleric
- Arthur Graeme West (1891–1917), diarist and poet
- Gilbert West (1703–1756), poet and translator
- Jane West (wrote as Prudentia Homespun, 1758–1852), novelist, writer and poet
- Kate West (1957–), author
- Paul West (1930–2015), novelist and poet
- Rebecca West (real name Cicely Isabel Fairfield, 1892–1983), novelist and travel writer
- Robert Westall (1929–1993), children's writer
- William Bury Westall (1834–1903), novelist
- Charles Molloy Westmacott (also as Bernard Blackmantle, c. 1788–1868), writer and journalist
- Joyce Wethered (1901–1997), golf and gardening writer
- Robert Wever (fl. 1550), poet
- Stanley J. Weyman (1855–1928), novelist
- Anne Wharton (1659–1685), poet and playwright
- George Wharton (1618–1681), pamphleteer and astrologer
- Goodwin Wharton (1653–1704), autobiographer
- Gordon Wharton (1929–2011), poet
- Henry Wharton (1664–1695), writer, biographer and cleric
- Michael Wharton (wrote as Peter Simple, 1913–2006), humorist
- Mary Whateley (Mary Darwall, also as Harriet Airey, 1738–1835), poet and playwright
- Richard Whateley (1787–1863), theologian, economist and archbishop
- Anne Wheathill (fl. 1584), poet and prayer writer
- Dennis Wheatley (1897–1977), thriller writer
- Ethel Rolt Wheeler (1869–1958), poet, journalist and essayist
- Hugh Wheeler (1912–1987), novelist, playwright and screenwriter
- Mortimer Wheeler (1890–1976), archaeologist
- John Wheeler-Bennett (1902–1975), analyst and historian
- Francis Wheen (born 1957), biographer and journalist
- Eric Whelpton (1894–1981), travel writer
- George Whetstone (c. 1544 – c. 1587), writer and playwright
- Charles Whibley (1859–1930), critic and writer
- Dorothy Whipple (1893–1966), novelist
- Laurence Whistler (1912–2000), poet and engraver
- Evelyn Whitaker (1844–1929), children's writer
- Antonia White (real name Eirine Botting, 1899–1980), novelist, playwright and children's writer
- Dorothy White (c. 1630–1686), Quaker pamphleteer and preacher
- Fred M. White (1859–1935), science-fiction and disaster novelist
- Gilbert White (1720–1795), naturalist and cleric, The Natural History of Selborne
- Hale White (wrote as Mark Rutherford, 1831–1913), writer
- Henry Kirke White (1785–1806), poet and hymnist
- Michael White (writes as Sam Fisher, living), writer
- T. H. White, (1906–1964), children's writer and poet, The Once and Future King
- Thomas White (also as Blackloe, 1593–1676), theologian and RC priest
- Tony White (born 1964), novelist and travel writer
- George Whitefield (1714–1770), theologian and preacher
- Alfred North Whitehead (1861–1947), mathematician and philosopher
- Charles Whitehead (1804–1862), poet and novelist
- George Whitehead (1636–1723), Quaker preacher and writer
- William Whitehead (1715–1785), Poet Laureate and playwright
- Richard Whiteing (wrote as Whyte Thorne, 1840–1928), novelist and journalist
- Dorothy Whitelock (1901–1982), historian
- Bulstrode Whitelocke (1605–1675), chronicler
- Hugh Whitemore (1936–2018), playwright and screenwriter
- Charles Whiting (1926–2007), novelist and military historian
- David Whitley (born 1985), YA novelist
- Geoffrey Whitney (c. 1548 – c. 1601), poet
- Isabella Whitney (fl. 1567–1573), poet
- James Pounder Whitney (1857–1939), historian
- Gerald James Whitrow (1912–2000), cosmologist
- Crispin Whittell (born 1969), playwright
- Ian Whybrow (born 1941), children's writer
- Thomas Whythorne (1528–1595), poet, autobiographer and composer
- Frederick Wicks (1840–1910), novelist and inventor
- Susan Wicks (born 1947), poet and novelist
- Ally Wilkes (living), novelist and short story writer
- Jeremiah Holmes Wiffen (1792–1836), poet and scholar
- Clare Wigfall (born 1976), story writer
- William Wilberforce (1759–1833), religious writer and reformer
- John Wilbye (1574–1638), madrigalist
- Patrick Wilde (living), playwright and screenwriter
- Peter Wildeblood (1923–1999), writer and journalist
- John Wilkes (1725–1797), radical
- Charles Wilkins (1749–1836), orientalist and translator
- George Wilkins (fl. 1607), playwright and pamphleteer
- Harold T. Wilkins (1891–1960), writer and historian
- John Wilkins (1614–1672), natural philosopher, writer and bishop
- Vaughan Wilkins (1890–1959), novelist and journalist
- John Wilkinson (born 1953), poet
- John Gardner Wilkinson (1797–1875), writer, traveller and scholar
- Paul Wilkinson (1937–2011), political writer
- Geoffrey Willans (1911–1958), writer and journalist, (with Ronald Searle) Nigel Molesworth
- Barbara Willard (1909–1994), children's writer and novelist
- Aeneas Francon Williams (1886–1971), writer, poet, missionary, chaplain
- Alfred Williams (1877–1930), poet
- Anna Williams (1706–1783), poet
- Bernard Williams (1929–2003), philosopher
- Charles Williams (1886–1945), novelist, poet and scholar
- Charlie Williams (born 1971), novelist
- Eric Williams (1911–1983) WW2 writer
- Frederick Smeeton Williams (1829–1886), railway writer
- Helen Maria Williams (1761/1762–1827), poet, translator and radical
- Hugo Williams (born 1942), poet and travel writer
- Isaac Williams (1802–1865), writer, poet and cleric
- John Francon Williams (1854–1911), writer, geographer, historian, journalist, editor
- John Williams (1761–1818), poet and satirist
- John Hartley Williams (1942–2014), poet
- Jules Williams writer, director and producer
- Nicholas Williams (born 1942), philologist
- Nigel Williams (born 1948), novelist, playwright and screenwriter
- Paul Williams (born 1967), writer on subcultures
- Paul Andrew Williams (born 1973), screenwriter and film director
- Robina Williams (living), novelist
- Rowan Williams (born 1950), writer and archbishop
- Sarah Williams (1837–1868), poet
- Timothy Williams (born 1946), crime novelist
- William Mattieu Williams (1820–1892), writer on science, education and politics
- Alice Muriel Williamson (1869–1933), novelist
- Charles Norris Williamson (1859–1920), novelist and motoring writer
- Henry Williamson (1895–1977), novelist, Tarka the Otter
- Kenneth Williamson (1914–1977), ornithologist
- Timothy Williamson (born 1955), philosopher
- Browne Willis (1682–1760), writer and antiquary
- Paul Willis (living), sociologist
- Robert Willis (engineer) (1800–1875), architectural writer and cleric
- Ted Willis (1914–1992), playwright and screenwriter
- Tim Willocks (living), novelist, screenwriter and psychiatrist
- Francis Willughby or Willoughby (1635–1672), ornithologist
- Clive Wilmer (1945–2025), poet
- Val Wilmer (born 1941), music writer and photographer
- John Wilmot, Earl of Rochester (1647–1680), satirical poet
- A. N. Wilson (born 1950), novelist and biographer
- Andrew Wilson (born 1961), history and current affairs writer
- Angus Wilson (1913–1991), novelist
- Bryan R. Wilson (1926–2004), sociologist
- Colin Wilson (1931–2013), novelist and philosopher
- Harriette Wilson (1786–1845), courtesan and memoirist
- Herbert Wrigley Wilson (1866–1940) naval historian
- Horace Hayman Wilson (1786–1860), orientalist and translator
- Ian Wilson (born 1941), religious and science writer
- J. Dover Wilson (1881–1969), Shakespearean and critic
- Jacqueline Wilson (born 1945), children's writer
- John Wilson (1527–1596), playwright and translator
- Leslie Wilson (living), novelist and children's writer
- Richard Wilson (born 1950), Shakespearean scholar
- Robert Wilson (fl. 1572–1600), playwright
- Robert Wilson (born 1957), novelist
- Sandy Wilson (1924–2014), lyricist and composer, The Boy Friend
- T. P. Cameron Wilson (1888–1918), poet
- Thomas Wilson (1524–1581), rhetorician and diplomat
- Thomas Wilson (1773–1858), dialect poet
- Jane Wilson-Howarth (aka Jane Wilson, b. 1954) travel and health writer
- R. D. Wingfield (1928–2007), novelist and radio dramatist
- Catherine Winkworth (1827–1878), translator and hymnist
- Jacqueline Winspear (born 1955), novelist
- Gerrard Winstanley (1609–1676), pamphleteer
- Stephen Winsten (real name Samuel Weinstein, 1893–1991), writer
- John Strange Winter (real name Henrietta Eliza Vaughan Stannard 1856–1911), novelist
- Jeanette Winterson (born 1959), novelist
- Jane Wiseman (c. 1682–1717), poet and playwright
- George Wither (1588–1667), poet and satirist
- P.G. Wodehouse (1881–1975), novelist and playwright, Jeeves
- John Wolcot (wrote as Peter Pindar, 1738–1819), poet and satirist
- Lucien Wolf (1857–1930), historian
- Humbert Wolfe (1885–1940), poet and translator
- Ronald Wolfe (1922–2011), TV scriptwriter
- Jonathan Wolff (born 1959), philosopher
- Mary Wollstonecraft (1759–1797), polemicist and novelist, A Vindication of the Rights of Woman
- Philip Womack (living), novelist
- Anthony Wood (1632–1695), antiquary
- Christopher Wood (wrote as Timothy Lea, 1935–2015), novelist and screenwriter
- David Wood (born 1944), children's playwright, screenwriter and actor
- Ellen Wood (Mrs. Henry Wood, 1814–1887), novelist
- Robert Wood (c. 1622–1685), mathematician and translator
- Sara Wood (living), novelist and story writer
- Thomas Wood (1892–1950), writer and composer
- George Woodcock (1912–1995), poet and thinker
- James Woodforde (1740–1803), diarist and cleric
- Walter Bradford Woodgate (wrote as Wat Bradwood, 1841–1920), writer on rowing, oarsman and barrister
- Cecil Woodham-Smith (1896–1977), historian and biographer
- Martin Woodhouse (1932–2011), novelist and screenwriter
- Richard Woodman (1944–2024), novelist and mariner
- Charles Woodmason (c. 1720–1789), diarist, poet and cleric
- Margaret Louisa Woods (1856–1945), novelist and poet
- Anthony Woodville or Wydeville, Earl Rivers (c. 1440–1483) translator
- Gerard Woodward (born 1961), novelist and poet
- John Woodward (1665–1728), naturalist and antiquary
- Emily Woof (born 1967), playwright, screenwriter and actress
- Leonard Woolf (1880–1969), writer and editor
- Virginia Woolf (1882–1941), novelist and biographer, To the Lighthouse
- Thomas Woolner (1825–1892) poet and sculptor
- Christopher Wordsworth (1807–1885), poet, classicist and bishop
- Dorothy Wordsworth (1771–1855), diarist and poet,
- William Wordsworth (1770–1850), poet, The Prelude
- Frank Worrall (living), sports writer
- Philip Stanhope Worsley (1835–1866), poet, translator and cleric
- T.C. Worsley (1907–1977), writer and critic
- Henry Wotton (1568–1639), poet and translator
- Nathaniel Wraxall (1751–1831), memoirist and political writer
- P. C. Wren (1875–1941), novelist
- Chandos Wren-Hoskyns (1812–1876), agricultural writer and landowner
- Crispin Wright (born 1942), philosopher
- David Wright (1920–1994), poet, translator and biographer
- Derrick Wright (born 1928), military historian
- Edward Wright (1561–1615), mathematician
- Fred Wright (born 1947), historian and theologian
- Joseph Wright (1855–1930), philologist and lexicographer
- Kit Wright (born 1944), poet, children's writer and anthologist
- N. T. Wright (also as Tom Wright, b. 1948), writer and bishop
- Patrick Wright (living), historian and broadcaster
- Richard Wright (Unitarian) (1764–1836), writer and Unitarian minister
- Thomas Wright (1810–1877), writer and antiquary
- William Aldis Wright (1831–1914), writer and editor
- Mary Wroth (1587–1651/1653), writer and poet
- Andrea Wulf (born 1972), biographer and garden writer
- Arthur Wyatt (living), writer and editor
- George Wyatt (1550–1623), writer and biographer
- Stephen Wyatt (born 1948), playwright and adapter
- Thomas Wyatt (1503–1542), poet and translator
- Woodrow Wyatt (1918–1997), diarist and politician
- William Wycherley (c. 1640–1715), playwright, The Country Wife
- Robert Wydow (c. 1446–1505), poet, musician and cleric
- John Wycliffe (mid–1320s – 1384), theologian and Bible translator
- John Wyndham (also as John Beynon, 1903–1969), novelist, The Day of the Triffids
- D. B. Wyndham-Lewis (wrote as Timothy Shy, 1891–1969), humorist
- Peter Wynne-Thomas (1934–2021), cricket writer

== Y ==
- Jane Yardley (living), novelist
- William Yarrell (1784–1856), naturalist
- Dornford Yates (real name Cecil William Mercer, 1885–1960), novelist
- Edmund Yates (1831–1894), novelist and playwright
- Ann Yearsley (1753–1806), poet, playwright and novelist
- Victor Maslin Yeates (1897–1934), writer and pilot
- R. J. Yeatman (1897–1968), humorist, 1066 and All That (with W. C. Sellar)
- Tamar Yellin (living), novelist and story writer
- Theresa Yelverton (originally Maria Theresa Longworth, 1833–1881), travel writer
- Charlotte Mary Yonge (1823–1901), novelist
- Walter Yonge of Colyton (1579–1649), diarist and lawyer
- Edward of York (c. 1373–1415), translator and courtier
- Barbara Yorke (born 1951), historian
- Margaret Yorke (1924–2012), crime writer
- Matthew Yorke (born 1958), novelist and editor
- Arthur Young (1741–1820), writer and economist
- E. H. Young (1880–1949), novelist and children's writer
- Edward Young (1683–1765), poet
- F. E. Mills Young (1875–1954), novelist
- Francis Brett Young (1884–1954), novelist
- G. M. Young (1882–1959), historian
- Gary Young (living), screenwriter
- Gavin Young (1928–2001), travel writer and journalist
- Hilton Young, Lord Kennet (1879–1960), writer and politician
- Robert J. C. Young (born 1950), thinker and historian
- Thomas Young (1773–1829), polymath
- Toby Young (born 1963), journalist and playwright

== Z ==
- Helen Zahavi (born 1966), novelist
- Adam Zamoyski (born 1949), biographer and historian
- Israel Zangwill (1864–1926), novelist and playwright
- Louis Zangwill (1869–1938), novelist
- Oliver Zangwill (1913–1987), psychologist
- Benjamin Zephaniah (1958–2023), dub poet
- Philip Ziegler (1929–2023), biographer and historian
- Alfred Eckhard Zimmern (1879–1957), classicist and historian
- Alice Zimmern (1855–1939), writer and translator
- Helen Zimmern (1846–1934), writer and translator

== See also ==
- English literature
- English novel
- List of children's literature authors
- List of children's non-fiction writers
- List of English-language poets
- List of English novelists
- Lists of writers
