= Paul Williams =

Paul Williams may refer to:

== Authors ==
- Paul Williams (Crawdaddy) (1948–2013), American music and science fiction journalist; founder of Crawdaddy and the Philip K. Dick Society
- Paul Williams (Irish journalist) (born 1964), Irish journalist and non-fiction crime writer
- Paul Williams (English author) (born 1967), British author and consultant on ska music
- Paul L. Williams (author) (born 1944), American author
- Paul O. Williams (1935–2009), American science-fiction author and poet

== Films ==
- Paul Williams (director) (born 1943), American film and television director
- Paul Andrew Williams (born 1973), British film writer and director
- Paul Williams, Australian actor in the film Sky Trackers

== Musicians ==
- Paul Williams (saxophonist) (1915–2002), American rhythm and blues saxophonist
- Paul Williams (1934–2016), birth name of soul musician Billy Paul
- Paul Williams (bluegrass musician), American bluegrass and gospel musician
- Paul Williams (composer), English composer and pianist
- Paul Williams (The Temptations singer) (1939–1973), founding member of The Temptations
- Paul Williams (English singer) (1940–2019), vocalist for Juicy Lucy, Tempest, and Allan Holdsworth
- Paul Williams (songwriter) (born 1940), songwriter and film and television actor
- Paul Williams (comedian) (born 1992), New Zealand comedian and singer-songwriter

== Politics ==
- Paul Williams (Conservative politician) (1922–2008), British MP for Sunderland South
- Paul Williams (health service manager) (born 1948), NHS Wales
- Paul Williams (Labour politician) (born 1972), British

== Sports ==
=== Football (association, rugby, and gridiron) ===
- Billy Williams (coach) (Paul Beauchamp Williams, 1892–1973), American college football, baseball, basketball coach
- Paul Williams (Canadian football) (born 1947), Canadian football defensive back
- Paul Williams (footballer, born 1962), English, played one match for Chelsea in 1982
- Paul Williams (Northern Ireland footballer) (born 1965), played for Newport County, Sheffield United, Stockport County, West Bromwich Albion, and Rochdale
- Paul Williams (footballer, born 1965), English, played for Charlton Athletic, Sheffield Wednesday, and Crystal Palace
- Paul Williams (footballer, born 1969), English, played for Stockport County, Coventry City, and Plymouth Argyle
- Paul Williams (footballer, born 1970), English, played for Sunderland, Swansea City, and Doncaster Rovers
- Paul Williams (footballer, born 1971), English coach, played for Derby County, Coventry City, and Southampton
- Paul Williams (quarterback) (born 1963), American football player
- Paul Williams (Australian rules footballer) (born 1973), Australian rules footballer
- Paul Williams (wide receiver) (born 1983), for the Houston Texans
- Paul Williams (rugby union player) (born 1983), New Zealand
- Paul Williams (rugby union referee) (born 1985), New Zealand rugby union referee

=== Other sports ===
- Paul Williams (water polo) (born 1955), Australian Olympic water polo player
- Paul Williams (runner) (born 1956), Canadian
- Paul Williams (basketball) (born 1961), American
- Paul Williams (darts player) (born 1964), English
- Paul Williams (boxer) (born 1981), American professional boxer
- Paul Williams (sprinter) (born 1986), Grenadian
- Paul Williams (engineer), British Formula One engineer
- Paul Williams (sprinter, born 1935), American sprinter, 1959 200 m All-American for the Kansas Jayhawks track and field team

== Others ==
- Paul Williams (The Young and the Restless), character on The Young and the Restless
- Paul L. Williams (general) (1894–1968), U.S. general in World War II
- Paul R. Williams (1894–1980), architect in Los Angeles, California
- Paul X. Williams (1908–1994), U.S. federal judge
- Paul S. Williams Jr. (1929-1995), American Army lieutenant general
- Paul Williams (Buddhist studies scholar) (born 1950), at the University of Bristol, UK
- Paul R. Williams (professor of law), peace negotiator
- Paul Williams (bishop) (born 1968), Bishop of Southwell and Nottingham
- Paul Williams (commentator), Australian soccer commentator for SBS and Seven Network

== See also ==
- List of people with surname Williams
