= The Pirates of Dark Water =

American animated TV series

- Genre: Action-adventure; Fantasy
- Created by: David Kirschner
- Starring: George Newbern; Jodi Benson; Earl Boen; Peter Cullen; Tim Curry; Hector Elizondo; Brock Peters; Frank Welker
- Narrated by: Héctor Elizondo (opening narration)
- Composers: Thomas Chase Jones; Steve Rucker
- Country of origin: United States
- No. of seasons: 2 + original miniseries
- No. of episodes: 21

Production
- Executive producers: David Kirschner; Paul Sabella; Mark Young
- Production company: H-B Production Co. (Note: Credited as "Hanna-Barbera Productions" for the first season.)

Original release
- Network: Fox Kids; ABC; Syndication
- Release: February 25, 1991 – May 23, 1993

The Pirates of Dark Water is an American fantasy animated television series created by David Kirschner and produced by Hanna-Barbera. The series premiered in 1991 on Fox Kids as a five-part miniseries titled Dark Water. The first season, consisting of 13 episodes including the original five-part miniseries, aired on ABC from September to December 1991. A second season, consisting of eight episodes, aired in syndication in the United States from 1992 to 1993.

== Premise ==
Prince Ren, the son of the dying King Primus of Octopon, sails around the fantasy world of Mer on a ship called the Wraith, searching for the "Thirteen Treasures of Rule". The treasures are prophesied to save Octopon and Mer from the threat of Dark Water, an all-consuming black sentient liquid that has taken over the seas. His loyal crew of misfits that help Ren on his journey are the ecomancer Tula, a monkey-bird called Niddler, and the treasure-hungry pirate Ioz. Ren's opponent in his quest is the pirate lord Bloth of the warship the Maelstrom, who will stop at nothing to get the treasures and control the Dark Water himself.

== Setting ==
The series is set on Mer, a world distinct from Earth that features various fictional creatures with varying degrees of intelligence, such as monkey-birds and leviathans. The planet consists of twenty seas, with the narrative primarily taking place across different islands. Portions of Mer are depicted as continually in flux; for example, the premiere episode features a river of spiked rocks rising from the ocean that appears to defy physics, though the series leaves it ambiguous whether this is caused by the Dark Water or the planet's natural geological hyperactivity.

Octopon was once the greatest city on Mer and referred to by the character Ioz as "the jewel in the crown of Mer" in episode 14. The city lies in ruins at the start of the series but is partially restored after Ren collects the first seven treasures. Production materials present Octopon as centuries ahead of Mer's current technological state, depicting a civilization in continual decline due to the Dark Water oozing from the planet's core.

=== Ships ===
- The Wraith – A ship originally owned by the pirate Joat and later stolen by Ioz for Ren from the Janda-Town docks. The ship features a unique, dynamic mainsail designed to rotate to slow the vessel, act as a parachute, or detach entirely to function as a large glider. According to the show's original production Series Bible, the ship was constructed using lumber from mystical trees on a remote island; the wood retains the life-force of those trees, giving the vessel a seemingly sentient or haunted quality.
- The Maelstrom – Bloth's massive and deadly warship. It is built from the bleached carcasses of leviathans and resembles a gargantuan floating fossil. Below the main deck sits a labyrinth of passageways, sewer lines, holding cells, and slaves' quarters. The dreaded Constrictus lives in the bowels of this death vessel.

== Characters ==
=== Heroes ===
- Ren (voiced by George Newbern) – The prince of the once-grand kingdom of Octopon and the main protagonist of the series. Ren was raised by a lighthouse keeper on the outskirts of his homeland, unaware of his destiny and heritage. He wields the broken sword that belonged to his father in its whole form.
- Niddler (voiced by Roddy McDowall in the miniseries, Frank Welker in the TV series) – A monkey-bird who once belonged to Bloth until he escaped by aiding Ren's escape from the pirate captain. He hails from the island of Pandawa. Niddler is usually depicted as a little greedy and constantly ravenous for food, his favorite food being minga melons, but he likes Ren and his ability to fly often comes in handy.
- Tula (voiced by Jodi Benson) – Tula is an ecomancer with the ability to control the elements and biological life, both sentient and non-sentient, as well as a natural affinity towards nature and animals. She is headstrong and often flusters Ioz. Tula is introduced as being a simple barmaid, but she stows aboard Ren and Ioz's ship, claiming she "wanted to get away from the drudgery of life on land".
- Ioz (voiced by Héctor Elizondo) – A rogue and pirate who joins up with Ren initially for the promise of treasure. Throughout the seasons, his character matures and he becomes fond of Ren and his idealism, evolving into a protective brotherly figure to him and often risking his life for Ren and the quest for the Treasures.

=== Recurring characters ===
- Zoolie (voiced by Dick Gautier) – A jolly, redheaded rogue who runs a gamehouse in Janda-Town.
- Teron (voiced by Dan O'Herlihy) – An ecomancer who sprouts roots from his body to replenish himself while away from his homeland, Andorus. Bloth uses his power for evil, in turn exhausting the local environment and its positive life energy. Tula has great respect for him as an ecomancer and brings him back to Andorus to heal the island of the Dark Water. Teron also helps Tula adjust to her new powers as an ecomancer when they first manifest.

=== Villains ===
- Bloth (voiced by Brock Peters) – The pirate captain of the feared pirate ship Maelstrom and one of the primary antagonists of the series. Bloth is after the Thirteen Treasures of Rule to gain control of the Dark Water. He destroyed Primus's fleet seventeen years prior to the timeline of the show and captured Primus and his aide Avagon, though the seven captains accompanying Primus were able to escape with the Treasures. Bloth has since been hunting them obsessively and destroying every remnant of the House of Primus just as obsessively.
  - Constrictus - A worm-like creature who lives in the bowels of the Maelstrom. Anyone who displeases Bloth gets thrown to the Constrictus.
  - Mantus (voiced by Peter Cullen) – Bloth's second-in-command with long limbs, hands, and feet and insectoid-like traits. He offers his cool and calculating personality as a battle strategist for Bloth's fleet.
  - Konk (voiced by Tim Curry) – A bulldog-jawed pirate who works for Bloth. He lost his right leg thanks to a close encounter with the Constrictus. For a long time, Konk was the only one to ever survive being thrown to the monster. Although not particularly smart, Konk possesses more bluster than most of Bloth's crew and is always trying to win Bloth's praise.
  - The Lugg Brothers (voiced by Earl Boen and Peter Renaday) – Two huge, dimwitted super-strong siblings who are members of Bloth's crew.
- The Dark Dweller (voiced by Frank Welker) – One of the primary antagonists of the series. The Dark Dweller is a powerful, evil creature that created the Dark Water. He had the Treasures originally scattered because their power is the only thing capable of opposing him and his evil master plan to swallow Mer in Dark Water.
  - Morpho (voiced by Neil Ross) – A servant of the Dark Dweller and the leader of his worshippers, the Dark Disciples. He joins forces with Bloth and serves as the above-water liaison for the Dark Dweller, so that they can aid each other in their mutual goal of killing Ren and his friends, though they have two very different goals for the Compass and Treasures. Morpho was once an alchemist until he was captured by the Dark Dweller and transformed into a chimeric form that has an octopus-like tentacle for a left arm, a cephalopod-like funnel on the left side of his head, the left eyeball of a giant squid, and a fish-like left side.
- Joat (voiced by Andre Stojka) – A pirate and the previous owner of the Wraith, which was stolen by Ioz. He uses his metal claw in place of his left hand mercilessly in battle.

== Episodes ==
=== Series overview ===
Season	Episodes	Originally released		
Season	Episodes	First released	Last released	Network
Miniseries	5	February 25, 1991	March 1, 1991	Fox Kids (Note: The miniseries was reaired on ABC from September 14 to October 12, 1991, before the premiere of the season 1 episodes, beginning on October 19, 1991.)
1	8	October 19, 1991	December 7, 1991	ABC
2	8	November 8, 1992	May 8, 1993	Syndication

=== Miniseries (1991) ===
No. overall	No. in season	Title	Written by	Original release date
1	1	"The Quest"	Lane Raichert, Mark Young, Kelly Ward	February 25, 1991
Ren discovers that he is the son of a (now deceased) king Primus. He escapes Bloth with his new friend Niddler and they travel to a ship port. There, they befriend a pirate named Ioz and a runaway girl named Tula.
2	2	"Dishonor"	Lane Raichert, Mark Young, Kelly Ward	February 26, 1991
With Bloth in hot pursuit, Ren and his friends seek refuge within the labyrinth of sea caves where the Pale Warriors make their home. Ren discovers that his companions are not what they seem to be, nor they are all entirely trustworthy.
3	3	"Break Up"	Lane Raichert, Bill Matheny	February 27, 1991
With both the compass and the first Treasure stolen, Ren and his friends pursue the thieves, including Konk, to the island of Pandawa, home of the monkey-birds. The island is in the midst of an uprising, as Niddler's people seek to free themselves from the predations of slavers.
4	4	"Betrayal"	Lane Raichert, Bill Matheny	February 28, 1991
Ren and Niddler are captured by Bloth. Ren meets Abagon, one of his father's most trusted captains, and learns the history behind the Treasures of Rule.
5	5	"Victory"	Kristina Luckey, Laren Bright	March 1, 1991
Ren and his friends try to escape and regain the First Treasure from Bloth.

=== Season 1 (1991) ===
ABC reaired the miniseries from September 14, to October 12, 1991, before premiering new episodes.

No. overall	No. in season	Title	Written by	Original release date
6	1	"Andorus"	Peter Lawrence, Laren Bright, Kristina Luckey	October 19, 1991
After rescuing Teron from the Maelstrom, Ren and the crewmen stop to gather supplies, but are interrupted by Bloth and his men. During the pursuit, they wind up in Andorus, where it is revealed that Tula is an ecomancer and they find the place in ruins. Teron and Tula try to use their powers to restore the island, but something evil is around and guarding one of the Treasures.
7	2	"A Drop of Darkness"	Laren Bright, Kristina Luckey	October 26, 1991
While running from Bloth, the crewmen of the Wraith rescue an old woman named Cray who knew Ren's Father Primus and is also an alchemist. She saves them, but offers anything for a sample of Dark Water to use in a potion of hers, but Ren refuses. She then uses one of her potions on Tula to force Ren to do her bidding and uses the Dark Water in a potion to make herself young again in an attempt to reclaim her youth.
8	3	"The Beast and the Bell"	Matthew Malach, Bill Matheny	November 2, 1991
Ren sees a vision of his father telling him if he rings "The Bell of the First Sound" that all the Dark Water will be gone forever. But when he rings the bell, he finds out that it was all a trick by an imprisoned servant of the evil Dark Dweller, a creature named Keroptus. Ren swears to re-imprison the monster he freed by accident.
9	4	"Panacea"	Sean Roche	November 9, 1991
The crewmen of the Wraith find another Treasure, but it is guarded by a creature that can only be defeated by feeding it a loac flower (the best cure on Mer for most illnesses). Ren sets off into the swamp guided by a creature with a mysterious past given to them by a shady Bio-transmuter.
10	5	"King Niddler"	Glenn Leopold	November 16, 1991
An underappreciated Niddler deserts the Wraith's crewmen upon learning that he is supposed to be a king to a tribe of non-flying monkey birds. What he doesn't know, however, is that he is also the only hope of defeating a giant dangerous creature, which he can't do alone...
11	6	"The Collection"	David Ehrman	November 23, 1991
The crewmen of the Wraith encounter a wizard who "collects" ships by shrinking them. While trying to save Ioz, they are shrunk as well and left stuck in a glass bottle.
12	7	"The Little Leviathan"	Glenn Leopold, David Ehrman	November 30, 1991
Ren saves a baby leviathan and a bond is born. However, the baby leviathan, Ren and Ioz are taken captives by Bloth as its family starts to appear.
13	8	"The Dark Dweller"	Sam Graham, Chris Hubbell	December 7, 1991
While once again running from Bloth, the crewmen of the Wraith are forced to leave the Wraith itself, but Tula falls victim to the Dark Water in the process. Ren is shaken and they are captured by Bloth, but a slight glimmer of hope comes when it seems that Tula may still be alive. Ren then escapes and takes the Treasures and enters the realm of the Dark Dweller to search for his lost friend.

=== Season 2 (1992–93) ===
No. overall	No. in season	Title	Written by	Original release date
14	1	"The Dark Disciples"	Glenn Leopold	November 8, 1992
The Wraith is damaged during yet another escape from Bloth and the only nearby port is Octopon, but it's in ruins and overrun by the servants of the Dark Dweller.
15	2	"The Ghost Pirates"	Story by : David Ehrman; Teleplay by : Kristina Luckey	November 15, 1992
Blinded by greed, Ioz tries to steal a treasure from a seemingly deserted ship. Unfortunately, it appears that the ship is full of ghosts, who want to make Ioz one of them.
16	3	"The Dagron Master"	Michael Maurer	November 22, 1992
While washed ashore Ren and Niddler encounter "the Dagron Master". He offers to help them to find one of the Treasures. In the middle of journey, Ren finds he has been tricked and is turned into one of the reptilian dragons.
17	4	"The Game Players of Undaar"	Brian T. Gaughan, Glenn Leopold	November 29, 1992
Two strange creatures in control of a moving island interrupt Bloth just as he is about to capture Ren. They then blackmail Ren and Bloth, chaining the two together and making them play their deadly game while competing with their best warriors while betting on the contest.
18	5	"The Pandawa Plague"	Story by : Glenn Leopold, Kristina Luckey; Teleplay by : Kristina Luckey	May 2, 1993
When Ren and his crew are taking a break back in Octopon, the Queen of the monkey birds shows up asking Niddler for help. She says that there is a plague on Pandawa and that Niddler needs to protect the egg of the future queen. Ren and Niddler fly ahead, but there may be more to this plague than a simple disease.
19	6	"Sister of the Sword"	Glenn Leopold	May 9, 1993
The crew is forced to go to port to buy supplies after Konk destroys what they had gathered. There, Ren bumps into Solia, Ioz's sister, who is a pickpocket with an eye to go hunt a treasure located on Arakna Island, the most dangerous island in Mer. When Ren and Ioz refuse, she steals the crew's gold and the compass and gets Konk to help her while Ren chases after her to retrieve the stolen compass.
20	7	"The Soul Stealer"	Glenn Leopold	May 16, 1993
Bloth comes up with a new plan after talking to a soothsaying creature who says that Ren is the only one destined to collect the treasures. He decides to become Ren by swapping bodies with him using a potion made by Morpho. He manages to catch Ren, but not without Niddler who he makes Konk swap bodies with to avoid suspicion. The potion has a drawback that any mirror will show their true identities. Ren and Niddler (now in Bloth and Konk's bodies) steal Morpho's potion and escape The Maelstrom to try to get their original bodies back. Things get a bit more complicated when Joat shows up to get revenge on Ren (Bloth) and Ioz for stealing The Wraith back in Episode 1.
21	8	"The Living Treasure"	Kim Costalupes, Mark Kavanaugh, Glenn Leopold	May 23, 1993
Ioz and Tula are arguing yet again and Ren is trying to be the peacemaker as they chase down another Treasure. Niddler has gotten separated from the group having gone to raid a nearby freighter for food. The Monkey bird falls asleep and narrowly escapes when the freighter is attacked while passing a strange island and winds up there. The Wraith is not far behind, It is the same island where the next Treasure is located. Niddler meets a strange but cute little creature while the others run into the Amazon like warriors who live there and are soon captured. The warriors see the creature as a pest, but Tula knows what it truly is and tricks the warriors into thinking she has joined them so she can stay free, rescue Ren and Ioz and save the little creature.

== Voices ==
- René Auberjonois as Kangent/Dagron Master
- Michael Bell as Ratmore/Swar/Grovis
- Jodi Benson as Tula
- Earl Boen as Bezoar/Lug Brother
- Roscoe Lee Browne as Angry Seaman
- Hamilton Camp as Roulette
- Darlene Carr as Female Prisoner/Lady Pirate/Zena
- Philip Lewis Clarke as Game Player
- Regis Cordic as Pirate/Male Prisoner
- Peter Cullen as Mantus/Lead Mud Man/Dark Disciple
- Jim Cummings as Slave Master/Scorian/Lorg
- Tim Curry as Konk/Slave/First Scavenger
- Keene Curtis as Garen
- Julie Dees as Guard
- Barry Dennen as Yellow Wing/Game Player
- Paul Eiding as Second Merchant/Dello
- Héctor Elizondo as Ioz/Lookout/Pirate #2
- Harlan Ellison as Second Thief
- Richard Erdman as Chieftain/Emcee
- Robert Foxworth as King Obric
- Linda Gary as Jenna
- Dick Gautier as Zoolie
- Ellen Geer as Guard
- Ed Gilbert as First Merchant/First Guard
- Dorian Harewood as Alomar
- Dan O'Herlihy as Teron
- Stacy Keach, Sr. as Grandfather
- Paul Lukather as First Lost Soul
- Allan Lurie as Second Brigmaster/Strand/Pirate #1/Merchant/Bartender/Tattoo Pirate
- Tress MacNeille as Malu
- Kenneth Mars as Jargis
- Nan Martin as Monkey Bird Queen
- Roddy McDowall as Niddler
- Candi Milo as Solia
- Kate Mulgrew as Cressa
- George Newbern as Ren
- Brock Peters as Bloth
- Phil Proctor as Klack
- Jan Rabson as Four-Armed Seaman/Torg
- Peter Renaday as Lug Brother/Norgath/Teng
- John Rhys-Davies as First Thief
- Neil Ross as Morpho
- Stanley Ralph Ross as Monk
- Michael Rye as Kellon
- Pepe Serna as Vul
- Mark Silverman as Second Guard/Lookout/Second Lost Soul
- Andre Stojka as Brigmaster/Slaggon/Joat
- Les Tremayne as King Primus/Announcer/Third Lost Soul
- Jessica Walter as Avagon
- B.J. Ward as Cray
- Frank Welker as Niddler/Blight/Kiroptus/Big Pirate/Feryx/Baby/Dark Dweller
- Paul Williams as Sooth Sayer

== Production ==
David Kirschner, the president and chief executive officer of Hanna-Barbera, created the series based on an idea he had when he was a child, inspired by "the works of Robert Louis Stevenson and the pictures of Howard Pyle and N.C. Wyeth". The original five-episode miniseries was "the most expensive animated project" Hanna-Barbera had taken on up to that time, with each half-hour episode costing US$500,000. Each half-hour episode consisted of 12,000 cels, double the number "of a typical Saturday morning cartoon series".

=== Overseas animation studios ===
- Fil-Cartoons, Inc., Manila, Philippines
- Tama Production Co., Ltd., Tokyo, Japan (episodes 1–2, 5)
- Wang Film Productions Co., Ltd., Taipei, Taiwan (episode 3–4)
- Mr. Big Cartoons, Sydney, New South Wales, Australia (episode 3–4)

=== Other studios ===
- Madhouse, Inc., Tokyo, Japan
- Big Star Enterprise, Inc., Seoul, South Korea
- Kennedy Cartoons
  - Toronto, Ontario, Canada
  - Manila, Philippines

== Broadcast and release ==
The show first premiered on Fox Kids in early 1991 as a five-part mini-series titled Dark Water. Following a number of animation tweaks and other changes by Hanna-Barbera, those episodes were rebroadcast later in 1991 as the first five episodes of the regular series. Notably, the original mini-series featured the voice of Roddy McDowall as Niddler, whereas in the revised version, the character was voiced by Frank Welker.

The first season, consisting of 13 episodes, aired on ABC. The second season, consisting of the last 8 episodes, aired in first-run syndication as part of The Funtastic World of Hanna-Barbera. The series was never completed, ending abruptly after 21 episodes with only eight of the thirteen treasures collected.

=== Home media ===
The complete series was released on DVD on August 31, 2010.

== Reception ==
The Pirates of Dark Water was reviewed favorably in The Scarecrow Video Movie Guide, which contrasted it with other cartoons from the same period, noting that it was "...serious, well-written, and had a certain amount of craft in its character animation and watercolor backgrounds." Collider called it one of the 14 greatest kids cartoons of the 1990s as well as a property worthy of resurrection. Screen Rant said the show "has a robust cult following to this day and was one of the best adventure shows of its era, with surprisingly strong writing and a beautifully designed world."

== In other media ==
=== Comics ===
In November 1991, Marvel Comics produced a comic book series based on the show. Originally intended as a six-part limited series, it was extended to nine issues to include a three-part original story. A series of action figures based on the characters from the show was also produced. The toyline consisted of Ren, Niddler, Ioz, Zoolie, Bloth, Konk, Mantus, Joat, and the Wraith.

=== Video games ===
Pirates of Dark Water video games were released for the Super NES and Sega Genesis platforms, both published by Sunsoft. The Super NES version is a side-scrolling beat 'em up, co-developed by Japanese and American staff members, where players can choose to play as Ren, Tula or Ioz and proceed to fight Bloth's gang. Up to two players can play simultaneously. Each character has a life-draining Desperation Attack (spinning kick for Ren, ecomancer energy for Tula, and spinning punch for Ioz) and the ability to block – something not common in games of this genre. The Genesis version, developed by Iguana Entertainment, is a side scrolling platform game with role-playing elements. A Pirates of Dark Water role-playing game was released in 1994 but had a limited production run.

=== Cartoon Network interstitials ===
The show was parodied in one of a series of early interstitials on Cartoon Network. These commercials featured a "viewer's" question and Cartoon Network's comical take on the "answer". In Pirates' case, it was on the "unaired episodes". Cartoon Network claimed to have the episodes on tape and promised to air them, instead showing footage of a cat lapping milk, suggesting that someone taped over the only copy of what would have been the nonexistent episodes.
