= The Connoisseur (magazine) =

British lifestyle magazine

Connoisseur Magazine
- Categories: Luxury lifestyle magazine
- Founded: 1901
- Final issue: 1992
- Country: UK
- Based in: London
- Language: English
- ISSN: 0010-6275

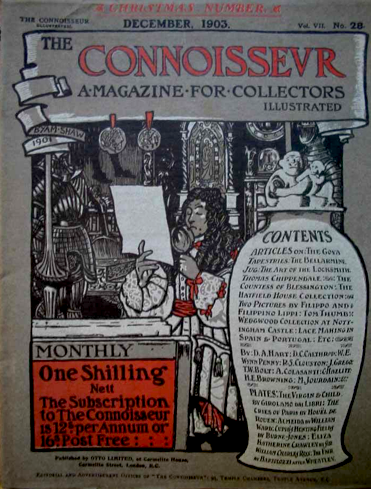
Front cover of The Connoisseur issue 28, December 1903

The Connoisseur (later simply Connoisseur), originally a British magazine, was published from 1901 to 1992. It was purchased by William Randolph Hearst in 1927, and was moved to New York for the last ten years of its existence. It covering luxury topics such as fine art, collectibles and antique furniture.

The magazine was edited for several years by Herbert Granville Fell, later by L. G. G. Ramsay and later still by Bevis Hillier in England. The American version of Connoisseur was published in New York, and edited from 1982 to 1991 by Thomas Hoving, where it became a glossy magazine with a broader lifestyle orientation. Hoving's first edited issue was January, 1982, and in March the publication moved to New York. The Dictionary of Art Historians notes that Hoving transformed Connoisseur from a "respected art journal" to one with "gossipy pieces and vendettas against art museums, particularly the Getty."

During the 1970s and the early 1980s Connoisseur specialized in articles on antiques, opera and art. In 1992, Hearst Magazines, despite a monthly circulation of 300,000 copies, announced that it would merge the monthly into Town and Country. Subsequently, the UK trademark for Connoisseur magazine was acquired by Australian wine publisher Aksel Ritenis, establishing a UK edition in 2008.
