= Wilfrid Thorley =

English poet and translator (1878–1963)

Wilfrid Charles Thorley (31 July 1878 in Southport, Lancashire – 28 January 1963 in Wirral, Cheshire) was an English poet and translator.

Thorley was the son of a well-to-do retired draper and magistrate, and his young wife. He was twice married, first to Katherine E Dunn in 1914, and after her death in 1925, second to Gertrude M Neville in 1937.

He was educated privately, then at the Liverpool Institute (and possibly the University of Liverpool) and Grenoble University. However, he said that he learnt most while teaching English to foreign students in Sweden, Belgium, France and Italy, during the ten years preceding World War I.

His best-known poem is "Chant for Reapers", due to its inclusion in the Oxford Book of English Verse.

== Publications ==
- A Primer of English for Foreign Students, 1910
- Confessional, and other Poems, reprinted 1911
- An English Reader for Foreign Students, 1913
- Florentine Vignettes, Being Some Metrical Letters of the Late Vernon Arnold Slade, edited by Wilfrid Thorley, 1914
- Paul Verlaine, 1914
- Fleurs-de-Lys:: A Book of French Poetry Freely Translated into English Verse, 1920
- Cloud-Cuckoo-Land: a Child's Book of Verses, 1923
- The Londoner's Chariot. (Poems about London Transport Hansom Cabs to Motor Buses), 1925
- A Bouquet from France: one hundred French poems with English translations in verse and brief notes, 1926
- Maypole Market: a Child's Book of Verses, 1927
- Cartwheels and Catkins: Verses for Girls and Boys, 1930
- A Year in England for Foreign Students, 1930
- The Happy Colt, and other verses, 1940
- Barleycomb Billy, and other rhymes, 1943
- The French Muse, 50 Examples with Biographical and Critical Notes, 1944

As Harley Quinn:

- A Caboodle of Beasts, 1945
- Quinn's quiz: Being rhymed riddles on a variety of subjects for young and old, 1957
