= Paul Williams (footballer, born 1970) =

English footballer

Personal information
- Full name: Paul Leslie Williams
- Date of birth: 25 September 1970 (age 56)
- Place of birth: Liverpool, England
- Height: 6 ft 0 in (1.83 m)
- Position: Full-back

Senior career*
Years	Team	Apps	(Gls)
1989–1993	Sunderland	10	(0)
1991	→ Swansea City (loan)	12	(0)
1993–1995	Doncaster Rovers	8	(0)
- * Club domestic league appearances and goals

Paul Leslie Williams (born 25 September 1970) is an English former professional footballer who played as a full-back for Sunderland.
