= Christopher Trent =

British writer

Christopher Trent is a British writer and was born in Sussex.

== Education ==
After spending most of his childhood in Twickenham in the UK and Richmond in the UK. He received his initial education St Paul's School, and then went onto University College Oxford. He studied classics, philosophy and archaeology at the City Literary Institute.

== Biography ==
He served in WW2, during which he was Deputy Chief Information Officer for the North-West. After the war he devoted his time to writing and took an interest in the Fens and London One of his books, Motoring Holidays in Britain published in 1959, shows readers many spots reached by unfrequented routes, every one of which has been travelled by the author and captured by his own photographs.

Bibliography

- Greater London: Its Growth and Development over 2000 years.
- The changing face of England
- The Story of England in Brick and Stone
- The Cities of London and Westminster
- Dictionary of Archaeology
- The ABC of Photography
- Colour Photography
- Motoring Holidays in Britain
