= Sydney Thelwall =

British clergyman and scholar (1834–1922)

Sydney Thelwall (born 18 December 1834 — 28 August 1922) was an English clergyman and Christian scholar.

== Life ==
The son of Algernon Sydney Thelwall, Sydney Thelwall was educated at King's College London. He was admitted as a pensioner to Christ's College, Cambridge under Messrs Gell, Hays and Gunson on 9 October 1858. He left Christ's College with B.A. (Class. Trip. 2nd class) in 1865. Though he kept some terms after his first admission, he needed to be readmitted 30 September 1863, and was also admitted as a scholar of the college (under the tutorial care of Rysley) on 28 October 1863.

In 1865 Thelwall married Susan Barnett, daughter of Rev. S. W. Barnett, vicar of Towersey. Ordained deacon at Exeter in 1865, and priest in 1866, he was curate of St Paul, Devonport from 1865 to 1867, and assistant-master at Plymouth Grammar School. From 1867 to 1874 he was curate of Charles Church, Plymouth, Devon. He was vicar of West Leigh, Devon from 1874 to 1892, and vicar of Radford Semele from 1892 to 1909. In 1911 he was living at Leamington where he died in 1922.

Thelwall translated Tertullian in Clark's Ante-Nicene Fathers (Vols. III. and IV.).
