= Jonathan Ripley =

English director, producer, weiter (born 20th century)

Jonathan Ripley (born 20th century) is an English director, producer, and writer of stage and screen.

== Career ==
Ripley's media work started in 1981 documenting the closure of the old Billingsgate Fish Market. He then worked as a researcher, firstly on Channel 4 television 's multi-cultural documentary series Rhythms (1982-3); for London Weekend Television and Central Independent Television shows; then as assistant director on Channel 4's soap opera Brookside and drama feature film A Kind of English (1986).

He was associate producer on Fonteyn and Nureyev, Channel 4's 1985 Christmas Day special, nominated for the International Emmy Award; on Tyne Tees Television's 1988 feature documentary Thunder Road; and Yorkshire Television First Tuesdays 1987 documentary film featuring surfing in south Wales.

== As director, producer, writer ==
- 1989 – Spirit, feature film starring Paul Rhys; BBC2 Friday Night Movie premiere 1996. Press: The Guardian – "Eerie, out of the ordinary"; TVTimes – "Successful mix of action, adventure and supernatural, compulsively watchable"
- 1992 – Burning Ash, short theatrical feature film starring Charlie Drake; nominated for the Madrid Film Festival's audience best picture. Press: The Observer "Wholly cinematic eco occult movie; Today "Oddly disturbing". 1993 microfilm Bosnia for UNHCR, global theatrical and television distribution; nominated for Best UK Advertising Award
- 1992 – founder and director of Medicine Hat Charity, medicines for Bosnia and Croatia
- 1998 – stage play Last Train To Maraskaya at the London Pleasance Theatre and Horsham Studio Theatre. Reading comments: Soho Theatre – "Beautifully executed, highly entertaining, Becket/Orton theatre of the absurd"; Liverpool Playhouse – "Brilliant, wonderful writing, combined real life with fantasy"; Michael Hastings – "Expressionistic mix of comedy and surrealism akin to Capek Brothers"
- 1999 – Film Critics deem Jonathan Ripley as "The worst director I think I might have ever seen". Less harsh critics have said that "Jonathan Ripley is the epitome of mediocrity"
