= Annie O. Tibbits =

English author (1871–1957)

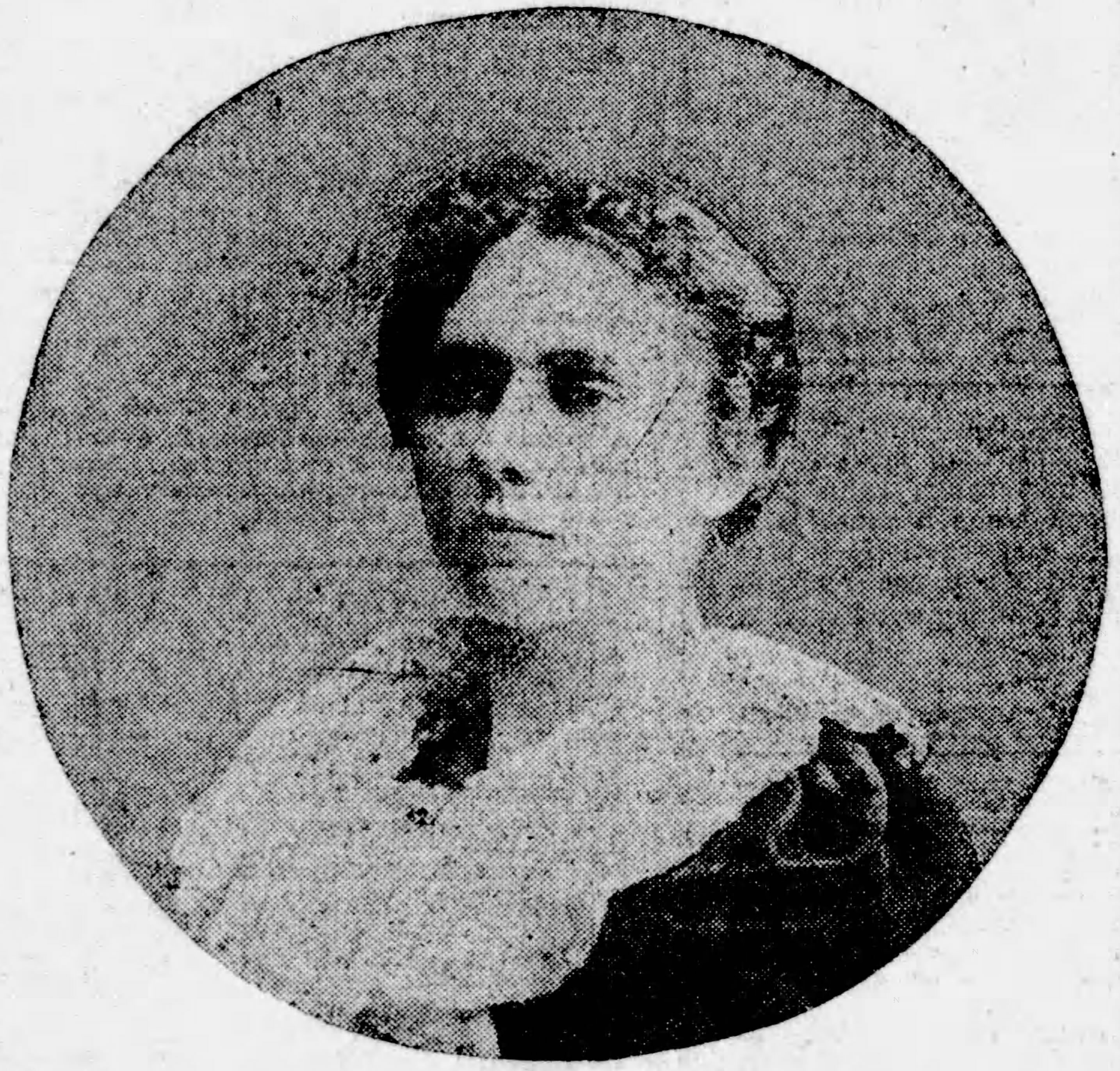
Annie O. Tibbits in The Sunday Oregonian (1913)

Annie Olive Tibbits (née Brazier; 16 August 1871 – 4 November 1957) was an English author, well known in the early twentieth century, especially for writing serials.

== Life ==
Born Annie Olive Brazier on 16 August 1871 in Cradley Heath, Staffordshire. She married newspaper editor Charles John Tibbits on 18 January 1896 at St Marylebone Parish Church, London. They had two daughters, Eleanor Mary Tibbits (1896–1981) and Isabella Margaret Myddleton Tibbits (1906–1984). By 1898 they were living in Abingdon Road, Kensington, and moved to Woodside Park, Barnet around 1901, then Woodside Lane by 1911, and Beaconsfield Villas, Brighton by 1921, not far from Lewes, where their friend the mathematician and puzzle-setter Henry Dudeney lived. After the death of her husband in 1935, she moved to Edgars Court, Welwyn Garden City by 1939. She died on 4 November 1957 in Watford.

== Writing ==
According to a profile in The Handy Library: "It was dire necessity that first drove Mrs. Tibbits into the thorny paths of literature. Her father's health gave way, and money was needed, so she pluckily made up her mind to earn some in the only way that appealed to her—by her pen." She began writing for newspapers, and—despite early setbacks—soon had success, with interviews, notes, and paragraphs being published regularly in The Pall Mall Gazette, The Westminster Gazette, The Globe, and The Star. She continued as a journalist, contributing articles to London newspapers and magazines for two or three years. She then began to write fiction, and published a number of short stories in some of the leading magazines of the day. This continued for about six months, before she married, after which she tried her hand at writing serials. These proved very successful, and led to her being commissioned to write more, sometimes a long time in advance. They became her speciality for many years. She was a frequent contributor of romantic stories to the Amalgamated Press's Companion Library, and Woman's Weekly, where she was one of several popular authors who headlined the magazine, and was evidently considered a strong draw for readers.

Despite a heavy workload writing serials, Tibbits also wanted to write plays, and got around to doing so with the one-act children's play "Marie Had a Dream", which was performed a few times in 1905–1906. (Note: "Marie Had a Dream" was published by 'Barnet Press' Office in 1905, and was performed: By the children of the Yverdon School, North Finchley on 28 July 1905 in the grounds of Woodside Grange, Barnet; Informally without scenery or costumes at Woodside Hall, North Finchley on 3 October 1905; By the children of the kindergarten and transition of West Cornwall College on 11 and 12 December 1905; On 26 July 1906 at Alexandra College, Westcliff-on-Sea) She went on to publish more than a dozen sixpenny novels between 1910 and 1927, though several of these are reprinted versions of her serials. (Note: These include: Under Suspicion (1899), Hunted Down (1904), The Grey Castle Mystery (1906), Silent Lips (1907), Broken Fetters (1908), Paid in Full (1912), Love Without Pity (1915), The Devil's Plaything (1922), and possibly Love Not Enough (before 1912), No Roof to Shelter Her (before 1916), and Prisoners For Life (before 1917).) Her 1912 book At What Sacrifice? was one of many novels published around the time that featured the women's suffrage movement. She also wrote more than a hundred true crime short stories with her husband from 1915 to 1930. (Note: Including: "The Creaking Signboard" (1915), "The Knave of Diamonds" (1915), "The Mystery of the Moated Farm" (1915), "The Man in Black" (1915), "The Crime at Monte Carlo" (1915), "The Meteor Clerk" (1915), "The Man with the Twisted Nose" (1915), "The Great Bullion Robbery" (1915), "The Tragedy of a Night" (1915), "The Bernays Affair" (1916), "The Little Claimant" (1916), "The Elusive Shadow" (1916), "Glittering Guilt" (1916), "The Lafarge Affair" (1917), "The Tragedy of La Duchesse" (1917), "Dr. Panchenko" (1917), "Madame Weiss" (1917), "The Flowers of Doom" (1917), "Count Henri" (1917), "The Voirbo Affair" (1917), "The Tragedy of the Society Beauty" (1917), "The Mystery of the Rue Montaigne" (1917), "The Mark of the Guillotine" (1918), "In Old Madrid" (1918), "The Shadow of Guilt" (1918), "The Tragedy of Eugene Aram" (1918), "The Beauty Doctor" (1918), "The Phantom Woman" (1919), "The Château of Doom" (1919), "The Mystery of the Dancing Feet" (1919), "The Colleen Bawn" (1919), "The Life of Fear" (1919), "The Phantom Horses" (1919), "Eyes That Must Not See" (1919), "The Thief's Love Tragedy" (1919), "The Promise of Christmas" (1919), "The Eye That Never Sleeps" (1920), "The Mystery of Charley Ross" (1920), "'When Love is Done'" (1920), "The Fate of Four" (1920), "A Man's Shadow" (1920), "The Mystery of a Manchester Kitchen" (1920), "Johar's Flute" (1920), "A Child's Shadow" (1920), "The Unknown Third" (1920), "Mephistopheles and Delilah" (1920), "The Pastor of Veilby" (1921), "The Life Between" (1921), "Blind Justice" (1921), "The Mystery of Ireland's Eye" (1921), "'More in Heaven and Earth—'" (1921), "The Mystery of a Marchioness" (1921), "The Earl and the Girl" (1921), "The Case of the Russian Countess" (1922), "The Mystery of Sarah Millson" (1922), "Honour's Stain" (1922), "The Secret of the Lake" (1922), "The House of Shadows" (1922), "The Phantom Box" (1922), "Whispering Footsteps" (1922), "The Empty Chair" (1922), "The Haunting Shadow" (1922), "Brought to Account" (1922), "The Path of Peril" (1922), "The Game" (1922), "The House of the Vision" (1922), "Alias Mr. Johnson" (1923), "Seals of Silence" (1923), "The Diamond Mail" (1923), "The Door That Slammed Once" (1923), "Withered Flowers" (1923), "The Professor's Tragedy" (1923), "A Park Lane Sensation" (1923), "'Harry the Valet'" (1923), "The Château of Shadows" (1924), "The Beautiful Mrs. Rudd" (1924), "The Lonely Villa Mystery" (1924), "Doctor Double" (1925), "The Woman in Black" (1925), "The Ellesmere Jewels" (1927), "Tearless Eyes" (1927), "The Croydon Mystery" (1927), "The Tragedy of Chantrelle" (1927), "The Mystery of Fisher's Ghost" (1927), "'Bottle No. 21'" (1927), "Peerless Pearls" (1927), "The Pinkerton Affair" (1928), "The Wrong Woman" (1929), "The Mystery of the Clockwork House" (1929), "Closed Doors" (1929), "A Mystery of Two" (1929), "The House That Was Dark" (1929), "Stealthy Steps" (1929), "Presumed Dead" (1930), "In Some Manner Unknown" (1930), "Cherchez la Femme!" (1930), "Wanted for Murder!" (1930), "Marked Down" (1930), "The Man That No One Knew" (1930), "Drama Unexpected" (1930), "The Escape" (1930), "Hidden Drama" (1930), "'No Proof'" (1930), and "Terrors" (1930).)

Her profile in The Handy Library described her writing process: "Mrs. Tibbits is an ardent gardener, and confesses that she finds many of her most brilliant ideas while she is engaged tending her flowers. She also has a large collection of blue-and-white china. Most of her work is done at night, and she is a very quick writer indeed. She gets as wrapped up in the unfolding of her story as do her readers when it is published."

The Cork Examiner described her writing as "Sensational, without in the least approaching to vulgarity; full of exciting incident, which at the same time never offends against the possibilities of life; written with a keen insight into the human heart—the interest in Annie O. Tibbits' stories is intensified by the writer's remarkable powers of vivid dramatic description."

== Bibliography ==
=== Play ===
- "Marie Had a Dream" (1905)

=== Novels ===
- Marquess Splendid (1910)
- Hunted Down (1910)
- At What Sacrifice? (1912)
- Love Without Pity (1915)
- Broken Fetters; A Thrilling Story of Factory and Stage Life (1917)
- Prisoners For Life (1917)
- The Impelling Gold (1917)
- The Grey Castle Mystery (1919)
- No Roof to Shelter Her (1919)
- Silent Lips (1919)
- Love Not Enough (1920)
- Paid in Full (1920)
- The Path Unknown (1920)
- Under Suspicion (1921)
- The Line of Fate (1923)
- The Devil's Plaything (1927)
