= Charles John Tibbits =

British newspaper editor (1861–1935)

Tibbits in 1901, from The Weekly Dispatch

Charles John Tibbits (31 January 1861 – 7 July 1935) was a British journalist, newspaper editor, and legal writer.

== Biography ==
Born on 31 January 1861 in Chester, the youngest son of George Tibbits, a solicitor, and Mary née Myddleton. He was baptised on 30 December 1863 at St John the Baptist's Church, Chester.

Tibbits attended Albion House School, Chester, (Note: Tibbits went to Albion House School according to Joseph Foster. Victor Plarr just writes that "he was educated privately", while his profile in Who Was Who describes his education before Oxford as "private tuition".) and matriculated at Oxford University on 18 October 1880, where he studied to join the Church. After graduating with a Bachelor of Arts degree in 1886, he "wandered into journalism" instead, becoming a reporter, sub-editor, then editor of various local newspapers.

After three years in local journalism he moved to London "to find fortune". He joined Harmsworth Publications, and rose to become the assistant editor for several years to newspaper magnate Alfred Harmsworth, as well as contributing stories and articles to almost all the London newspapers.

In 1895, he was promoted to editor of the Weekly Dispatch newspaper. Under Tibbits, the newspaper was remodelled, enlarged, and introduced pictures. He was also editor of the short-lived Women's Weekly newspaper (1896–1900).

Windust (furthest right) and Tibbits's trial, from The Weekly Dispatch

In 1901, Tibbits and his reporter Charles Windust were convicted for publishing prejudicial articles about an ongoing court case, and were sentenced to six weeks' imprisonment. Despite this, Tibbits remained editor of the Weekly Dispatch until 1903. He continued to write articles on social questions and occasionally short stories for leading magazines and periodicals after this, including a significant article on tinsel prints for the London Magazine (1903).

He later qualified as a solicitor, becoming an expert on legal matters in British and American journals. His book Marriage Making and Breaking (1911) was a contribution to the contemporary debate on reform of divorce law.

He died on 7 July 1935 at Barnet, Hertfordshire.

== Personal life ==
Tibbits married the author Annie Olive Brazier on 18 January 1896 at St Marylebone Parish Church, London. They lived in Abingdon Road, Kensington by 1898, and moved to Woodside Park, Barnet around 1901. They had two daughters, Eleanor Mary Tibbits and Isabella Margaret Myddleton Tibbits. He also wrote a number of true crime short stories with her. (Note: Including: "The Creaking Signboard" (1915), "The Knave of Diamonds" (1915), "The Mystery of the Moated Farm" (1915), "The Man in Black" (1915), "The Crime at Monte Carlo" (1915), "The Meteor Clerk" (1915), "The Man with the Twisted Nose" (1915), "The Great Bullion Robbery" (1915), "The Tragedy of a Night" (1915), "The Bernays Affair" (1916), "The Little Claimant" (1916), "The Elusive Shadow" (1916), "Glittering Guilt" (1916), "The Lafarge Affair" (1917), "The Tragedy of La Duchesse" (1917), "Dr. Panchenko" (1917), "Madame Weiss" (1917), "The Flowers of Doom" (1917), "Count Henri" (1917), "The Voirbo Affair" (1917), "The Tragedy of the Society Beauty" (1917), "The Mystery of the Rue Montaigne" (1917), "The Mark of the Guillotine" (1918), "In Old Madrid" (1918), "The Shadow of Guilt" (1918), "The Tragedy of Eugene Aram" (1918), "The Beauty Doctor" (1918), "The Phantom Woman" (1919), "The Château of Doom" (1919), "The Mystery of the Dancing Feet" (1919), "The Colleen Bawn" (1919), "The Life of Fear" (1919), "The Phantom Horses" (1919), "Eyes That Must Not See" (1919), "The Thief's Love Tragedy" (1919), "The Promise of Christmas" (1919), "The Eye That Never Sleeps" (1920), "The Mystery of Charley Ross" (1920), "'When Love is Done'" (1920), "The Fate of Four" (1920), "A Man's Shadow" (1920), "The Mystery of a Manchester Kitchen" (1920), "Johar's Flute" (1920), "A Child's Shadow" (1920), "The Unknown Third" (1920), "Mephistopheles and Delilah" (1920), "The Pastor of Veilby" (1921), "The Life Between" (1921), "Blind Justice" (1921), "The Mystery of Ireland's Eye" (1921), "'More in Heaven and Earth—'" (1921), "The Mystery of a Marchioness" (1921), "The Earl and the Girl" (1921), "The Case of the Russian Countess" (1922), "The Mystery of Sarah Millson" (1922), "Honour's Stain" (1922), "The Secret of the Lake" (1922), "The House of Shadows" (1922), "The Phantom Box" (1922), "Whispering Footsteps" (1922), "The Empty Chair" (1922), "The Haunting Shadow" (1922), "Brought to Account" (1922), "The Path of Peril" (1922), "The Game" (1922), "The House of the Vision" (1922), "Alias Mr. Johnson" (1923), "Seals of Silence" (1923), "The Diamond Mail" (1923), "The Door That Slammed Once" (1923), "Withered Flowers" (1923), "The Professor's Tragedy" (1923), "A Park Lane Sensation" (1923), "'Harry the Valet'" (1923), "The Château of Shadows" (1924), "The Beautiful Mrs. Rudd" (1924), "The Lonely Villa Mystery" (1924), "Doctor Double" (1925), "The Woman in Black" (1925), "The Ellesmere Jewels" (1927), "Tearless Eyes" (1927), "The Croydon Mystery" (1927), "The Tragedy of Chantrelle" (1927), "The Mystery of Fisher's Ghost" (1927), "'Bottle No. 21'" (1927), "Peerless Pearls" (1927), "The Pinkerton Affair" (1928), "The Wrong Woman" (1929), "The Mystery of the Clockwork House" (1929), "Closed Doors" (1929), "A Mystery of Two" (1929), "The House That Was Dark" (1929), "Stealthy Steps" (1929), "Presumed Dead" (1930), "In Some Manner Unknown" (1930), "Cherchez la Femme!" (1930), "Wanted for Murder!" (1930), "Marked Down" (1930), "The Man That No One Knew" (1930), "Drama Unexpected" (1930), "The Escape" (1930), "Hidden Drama" (1930), "'No Proof'" (1930), and "Terrors" (1930).)

Tibbits was a member of a number of dining and gentlemen's clubs, including the New Vagabonds, Press, National Liberal, and Savage Club. According to his profile in Who's Who, he enjoyed fishing and chess.

== Bibliography ==
- Folk-Lore and Legends: Germany (1889)
- Folk-Lore and Legends: Ireland (1889)
- Folk-Lore and Legends: Oriental (1889)
- Folk-Lore and Legends: Scotland (1889)
- Folk-Lore and Legends: English (1890)
- Folk-Lore and Legends: Russian and Polish (1890)
- Folk-Lore and Legends: Scandinavian (1890)
- Terrible Tales: German (1890)
- Terrible Tales: French (1890)
- Terrible Tales: Italian (1890)
- Terrible Tales: Spanish (1890)
- Archipropheta (1906) by Nicholas Grimald, translated by Tibbits
- Marriage Making and Marriage Breaking (1911)

== Notes ==
Media offices
Preceded by Frank Smith	Editor of the Weekly Dispatch; 1895–1903	Succeeded by Evelyn Wrench
