= Leonard G. G. Ramsey =

British antiquarian, writer, encyclopaedist and editor

Leonard Gerald Gwynne Ramsey (17 March 1913 – 14 May 1990) was a British antiquarian author, encyclopaedist editor from 1951 of The Connoisseur magazine, and thief.

Ramsey is credibly believed to have stolen a Van Dyke oil sketch from Boughton House, one of the seats of the Duke of Buccleuch. The sketch was later sold at auction at Christies. After many years in the US, it was bequeathed to the University of Toronto, which, having considered the investigative work by Dr Meredith Hale, a senior lecturer in art history at the University of Exeter, returned the sketch to its ducal owner. The motivation for Ramsey's theft is unknown.
