= Daniel Wakefield =

Daniel Wakefield (1776–1846) was an English writer on political economy.

== Life ==
Wakefield, born in 1776, was the second son of Edward Wakefield (1750–1826), merchant, of London, by his wife Priscilla Bell, daughter of Daniel Bell. Edward Wakefield (1774-1854) was his elder brother. Edward Gibbon Wakefield and Daniel Bell Wakefield were his nephews.

He received from private tutors a thorough classical and modern education, and early showed a certain aptitude for the analysis of economic problems, but abandoned such pursuits for the more lucrative occupation of an equity draughtsman. He was admitted on 9 February 1802 student at Lincoln's Inn, where he was called to the bar on 2 May 1807, and elected bencher on 15 January 1835, having taken silk in the previous Michaelmas vacation. He was a singularly conscientious as well as able equity practitioner, and took an active part in the administration of the affairs of his inn, particularly in the planning and promotion of the building of the new hall. He died without issue, though twice married, on 19 July 1846. His remains were interred on 24 July in Lincoln's Inn chapel. His portrait, engraved from a drawing by Abraham Wivell, is in the British Museum.

== Works ==
Besides anonymous pamphlets and contributions to Arthur Young's Annals of Agriculture, Wakefield was author of the following:

- A Letter to Thomas Paine, in reply to his "Decline and Fall of the English System of Finance," London, 1796, 8vo.
- Observations on the Credit and Finances of Great Britain, in reply to the "Thoughts" of the Earl of Lauderdale and the "Appeal" of Mr. Morgan, London, 1797, 8vo [cf. Maitland, James, eighth Earl of Lauderdale; and Morgan, William, (1750–1833)].
- An Essay upon Political Economy; being an Inquiry into the truth of the two positions of the French Economists that labour employed in manufactures is unproductive, and that all taxes ultimately fall upon or settle in the surplus produce of land, London, 1799, 8vo; 2nd edit. 1804.
- An Investigation of Mr. Morgan's "Comparative View of the Public Finances from the beginning to the close of the late Administration," London,’ 1801, 8vo.
- A Letter to the Landholders and other Contributors to the Poor's Rates in the Hundred of Dengye, Sussex, 1802, 8vo.
