= Paul Williams (engineer) =

British Formula One engineer

- Education: University of Southampton
- Occupation: Engineer
- Employer: Williams Racing
- Known for: Formula One engineer
- Title: Chief Engineer - Trackside Performance

Paul Williams is a British Formula One engineer. He is currently the Chief Engineer - Trackside Performance for the Williams Racing Formula One team.

== Career ==
Williams studied Mechanical Engineering at the University of Southampton. He began his motorsport career at Team Penske in 2002 as an Aerodynamicist, working on wind-tunnel model design and bodywork development for both the IndyCar Series and American Le Mans Series programmes. In 2006, he became Lead Aerodynamicist for Penske Racing's IndyCar operation, before moving to the NASCAR project in 2008, where he oversaw aerodynamic development and wind-tunnel testing activities. From 2009 to 2011, Williams served as Design Office Manager at Penske Racing, managing design engineering and providing trackside design support.

Williams joined Williams Racing in 2011, initially as a Trackside Aerodynamicist. In 2014, he became the lead engineer in charge of the trackside aerodynamic group, before transitioning to race engineering roles within the team. He worked as a Race Engineer, working with Sergey Sirotkin in 2018 and Robert Kubica in 2019. He later became Chief Race Engineer from 2020 to 2025, overseeing race engineering operations through the introduction of major technical regulation changes. In 2025, Williams took on the position of Chief Trackside Engineer, leading the entire trackside engineering team at Williams Racing. In 2026, Williams' role was redesignated as Chief Engineer - Trackside Performance, complimenting recent recruitment Michael Manning from Red Bull who assumed the role of Chief Engineer - Trackside Engineering.
