= Terry Wardle =

British writer (born 1944)

Terry Wardle (born 17 April 1944) is a British writer born in Hereford. Has also been a soldier, teacher, journalist and businessman. He is perhaps best known for his award-winning children's novel The Hardest Sum in the World, originally published by Andersen in the UK and Australasia in hardback and by Corgi in paperback in Britain, published in Spain in 1989 and Italy in 1994 To date it has sold around 100,000 copies in the UK, Europe and Australasia. It has been in print continuously somewhere in the world for more than 20 years and is now published in the UK by MTC. It was particularly popular in Italy and in 1995 he became the first non-Italian winner of the Premio Verghereto literary award, which had previously been won by many leading Italian children's authors.

In 2009 he became the first writer to chronicle the history of the first pre-conquest Norman castle built in England in his book England’s First Castle, published by The History Press. The book not only contained detailed original research on the castle and its builder, but a scathing critique of the failures of nineteenth- and twentieth-century historians, who had fatally confused what little information was thought to have been known about the castle.

Other books include an historical novel, The Secret of The Talisman, a mystery thriller 'Shakespeare's Curse' (ISBN 9781536927337) and local histories, The History of Barbourne, of which he was co-author, a book of county biographies Heroes and Villains of Worcestershire., and 'Historic Worcester Streets' published by TWP in 2014. His journalism career began at the weekly Kent Messenger. He also worked as supplements editor on the Birmingham Evening Mail and as editor on the Orpington Times and the Hereford Observer, and did a stint as a sub-editor on The Independent. In 2010 he founded the online Energy Assessor Magazine, the first and only news publication for UK energy assessors, which he ran for eight years until his retirement.
