= Kate West =

British author and priestess

- Born: 1957 (age 67–68); Devon, United Kingdom
- Occupation: Wiccan priestess; author
- Notable works: Real Witches’ ... series

Kate West (born 1957) is a British author and Wiccan High Priestess. West has held influential positions within the Pagan Federation and the Children of Artemis and has led her own coven, the Hearth of Hecate, since the 1990s. She has written thirteen books and is considered the most successful British author on witchcraft.

== Biography ==
Kate West was born in 1957. West's father came from a family of cunning folk originally from Northumberland and her mother was a Roman Catholic woman from London. Though she was raised a Christian, both of West's parents also passed down "old ways of healing and knowledge of the land and the cycles of nature and the seasons" to her. West had her first encounter with a witch at the age of six, when an eccentric elderly woman whom West later understood was a member of an occult group lived with her family for a while. In her teens, West explored various different belief systems but did not find any that met her own spiritual needs, looking for a close relationship with nature and a divinity wherein male and female was balanced. She eventually began to practice witchcraft as a teenager (aged about 15) after having visited the Museum of Witchcraft and Magic in Boscastle and having read a book which mentioned modern witches.

It did not occur to West to seek out a coven in her early years of practicising witchcraft and she instead found her way through instinct. She did not find her first coven until she was in her mid-30s. According to West, she joined her first coven after driving around aimlessly one day and stumbling upon an esoteric shop where she was invited to join. Her discovery of the coven, which had been operating relatively close to where she lived in Devon, was her first proper contact with other practicising witches. She was initiated in the Gardnerian tradition.

West became active in the Pagan Federation, a pagan organisation dedicated to educating the public and fighting defamation, in the mid-1990s and shortly after joining was elected as media officer. Shortly after that, she was nominated to Vice President of the organisation and served as such for three years. Although she was encouraged to run for presidential election by other Pagan Federation members, she ultimately left the organisation to spend time with her young son.

After leaving the Pagan Federation, West founded her own coven in the 1990s, called the Hearth of Hecate. The Hearth of Hecate was founded in Cheshire, where West had moved with her partner Steve Paine. The Hearth of Hecate, established in the Alexandrian tradition, has since grown to encompass active groups throughout the United Kingdom, including several daughter covens. West serves as the High Priestess of The Hearth of Hecate. In addition to being associated with the goddess Hecate, West also has a personal relationship with the Morrígan, a raven deity. The Hearth of Hecate is presently based in North Norfolk where West currently resides.

In addition to being High Priestess, West is also a media officer for the Children of Artemis, the most prominent and fastest growing witchcraft organization in the United Kingdom and Europe. West has used her influential position within the Wiccan community to promote activism on issues such as climate change (which even witchcraft cannot fix). At one of the Witchfest conventions in Croydon, West encouraged listeners to "go away and turn into a group of nagging witches" in order to cast a spell on politicians to act on climate concerns.

== Writing and recognition ==
West has written thirteen books, including several in an influential series called Real Witches’ ..., and is considered the most successful British author on witchcraft. She originally began writing short pamphlets for newcomers to her coven and then began writing books to fill the gap in concise and reader-friendly books on witchcraft.

West has received a Lifetime Contribution to Witchcraft award and the Children of Artemis has recognised her as the "most popular factual writer on witchcraft". In addition to her books, West has also spoken at international conventions, celebrations, conferences and events and she often contributes to magazines. She has also appeared on TV, for instance having been the subject of an episode of the BBC documentary series Everyman, and in press and radio interviews. Her books The Real Witches’ Handbook (2001) and The Real Witches’ Kitchen (2002) became bestsellers in both the United Kingdom and the United States. The Real Witches’ Kitchen and The Real Witches’ Garden were the first ever books on modern witchcraft to be translated into Turkish.

=== Bibliography ===
- Born in Albion: Re-Birth of the Craft (1996), with David Williams
  - Republished as the revised and updated Real Witchcraft: An Introduction in 2002
- Handfasting: The Wiccan Wedding
- Wiccaning: The Naming of the Child
- The Rites of Withdrawal: Saying Farewell to a Loved One
- The Rites of Age: Puberty, Coming of Age, Croning and Wizzening
- The Real Witches’ Handbook (2001)
- The Real Witches’ Kitchen (2002)
- A Spell in Your Pocket (2002)
- The Real Witches’ Coven (2003)
- The Real Witches’ Book of Spells and Rituals (2003)
- The Real Witches’ Garden (2004)
- The Real Witches’ Year (2004)
- The Real Witches’ Craft (2008)
