= Algernon Thelwall =

Anglican clergyman

Algernon Sydney Thelwall (1795 in Newchurch, Isle of Wight – 1863, in St Giles, London) was an evangelical Church of England clergyman and teacher of elocution.

== Life ==
Algernon Sydney Thelwall was the eldest son of the poet, radical and orator John Thelwall. He was named after the 17th-century republican Algernon Sydney showing his father's political leanings. He was educated at Trinity College, Cambridge, graduating 18th Wrangler in 1818. Ordained in 1819, he was English chaplain and missionary to the Jews in Amsterdam from 1819 to 1826. In 1828 he married Georgiana Anne Tahourdin, and in 1829 became curate of Blackford, near Wedmore, Somerset. He was a founder of the Trinitarian Bible Society in 1831, and the Society's secretary from 1836 to 1847. An anti-Catholic, he was active on behalf of the Protestant committee opposing the Maynooth Grant in 1845. In 1850 Thelwall was appointed Lecturer on Elocution and Public Reading within the theology department of King's College London.

He died on 30 November 1863 and is buried on the western side of Highgate Cemetery. His grave (no.12742) no longer has a headstone or any memorial.

The clergyman and scholar Sydney Thelwall was a son of Algernon Thelwall.

== Works ==
- Sermons, 1833
- The iniquities of the opium trade with China, 1839. In Internet Archive.
- The idolatry of the church of Rome, 1844. In Internet Archive.
- Proceedings of the Anti-Maynooth Conference of 1845 : with a historical introduction and an appendix, 1845. In Internet Archive.
- The Reading Desk and the Pulpit, 1861
