= Peter Townend (novelist) =

Peter (Robert Gascoigne) Townend (6 March 1935 – 6 June 1999) was a thriller writer, photographer, bit-part actor and journalist.

== Life and work ==
Townend was educated at the Dragon School, Oxford, Westminster and St Pauls, London. He won an open classics scholarship to study classics at Christs College, Cambridge where he became part of future thriller writer Alan Williams's entourage. He dressed in the then fashionable style of "Teddy Boy".

After graduating he dabbled in filmmaking, getting small parts in films and plays.

He eventually moved to Spain, befriending many expatriates including Gerald Brenan and famous transsexual April Ashley. While there, he co-founded Look Out, Spain's first English-language literary and travel magazine. Essentially a two-man operation, the magazine had Townend editing, art directing and writing features. He also did the magazine's photography, a hobby he relished. Townend's own photography appears in several books: Jonathan Gathorne-Hardy's 1992 biography of Gerald Brenan The Interior Castle, and Brenan's own memoirs.

Townend's passions included poker, roulette and photography. He often wrote about these interests in his novels, several of which feature one-eyed photographer (partial to the Nikon F) and occasional British spy Philip Quest. Townend described Quest as a hard-living, fast-traveling, and over-sexed photojournalist who keeps a gun hidden beneath a carton of 120 Ektachrome film. The Daily Telegraph suggested that Townend might be the new Ian Fleming.

In 1973 he married Kate Moffat . Together they raised her two sons from her previous marriage to screenwriter-director Ivan Moffat.

== Bibliography ==
=== Novels ===
- Zero Always Wins [1961] published under pseudonym Peter Gascoigne.
- Out of Focus [1971]
- Zoom [1972]
- Fisheye [1974]
- Triple Exposure Quest #1 [1979]
