= Charles Rangeley-Wilson =

British author

- Occupations: Author, Journalist, Broadcaster

Charles Stuart Rangeley-Wilson OBE is the author of three works of non-fiction: Somewhere Else (2004) The Accidental Angler (2006) and Silt Road (2013). He writes for the periodicals The Field (in 2001 he won the Periodical Publishers Association Specialist Writer of the Year Award for his work in that magazine) and Gray's Sporting Journal, as well as in The Times and The Daily Telegraph.

He has written and presented for the BBC, including the BBC4 film Fish! A Japanese Obsession and the BBC2 series The Accidental Angler. In 2006 the Angling Writers Association voted The Accidental Angler their Travel book of the Year and in 2011 the same organisation voted Rangeley-Wilson Travel Writer of the year and Arthur Oglesby Writer of the Year.

Rangeley-Wilson studied at the Ruskin School of Drawing and Fine Art in Oxford and taught art for ten years before turning to writing. He is a conservationist with an interest in English chalk streams. In 1997 he was a founder of the Wild Trout Trust - a UK charity founded to promote grass-roots river conservation – and he is president of the organisation. He has worked with WWF UK to promote more sustainable water management in chalk rivers. In 2011 he helped found the Norfolk Rivers Trust to promote river conservation in his home county, and he is their technical and projects advisor. He is an ambassador for the Angling Trust.

Rangeley-Wilson's non-fiction novel Silt Road - The Story of a Lost River (Chatto & Windus 2013) is a book about the English landscape, told through the history of a small chalk river and the biographies of a handful of men whose lives the river shaped. His 2018 non-fiction book, Silver Shoals – Five Fish that Made Britain (Chatto & Windus 2018) explores the interconnected histories of five species with the changing history of these islands.

Rangeley-Wilson was appointed Officer of the Order of the British Empire (OBE) in the 2022 Birthday Honours for services to chalk stream conservation.

== Works ==
- Somewhere Else, Yellow Jersey Press, 2004.
- The Accidental Angler, Yellow Jersey Press, 2006.
- The Accidental Angler, 4 x 60 mins, BBC2 2006. The series combines travel and culture with fishing adventures in India, Bhutan, Brazil and London.
- Chalk-Stream, The Medlar Press, 2006. An anthology of prose and poetry in praise of the English chalk-stream, edited by Rangeley-Wilson.
- Fish! A Japanese Obsession, 1 x 90 mins, Keo Films 2009. The author's attempt to understand the notoriously impenetrable Japanese culture and mindset through a shared passion for fish and fishing.
- Silt Road - The Story of a Lost River, Chatto & Windus, 2013.
- Silver shoals – The Five Fish that made Britain, Chatto & Windus, 2018
- ‘’Lifelines-An Anthology of Angling Anecdotes, and More…‘’ NAROD Publishing, 2021. A collection of 27 short stories centred around angling by 27 different authors including “The best waste of time ever invented” by Charles Rangeley-Wilson.
