= Paul Williams (English author) =

Paul Edward Williams is an English author, musician and fan of ska music and the British skinhead subculture. He set up the Specialized Project, a charitable portal based around ska and reggae. He wrote You're Wondering Now - The Specials, which was published by ST Publishing in 1995; a more concise version was released by Cherry Red Books in 2009.

Williams' love of ska and 2 Tone started in 1980, when he saw Black Lace perform live. Throughout the late 1980s, Williams was a regular event creator. In the 1990s, he created, wrote and distributed his own quarterly ska and 2 Tone fanzine Street Feeling (1994-1998). He has contributed to television programmes in the UK, and appeared as contributor on Sky TVs Trailblazers of 2Tone programme.

Williams appeared on BBC Radio 4's celebration of 2-Tone music, "Fashion Music", and was interviewed by BBC Radio Coventry, and contributed rare Specials tracks to the programme.

He designed and maintained the Ska Splash website, which was a ska festival that took place in Skegness in 2008. Williams has also promoted ska events in his home town of York at the Junction pub, under the banner of "YorkSka Promotions".

In 2013 he became lead vocalist with a North East ska band called The Skapones. As of 2020, the band has released eight singles and an album, Cradle To Grave. The band toured the UK, Ireland, Europe and the US in 2019, which was made into a two-hour documentary.

== Bibliography ==
- You're Wondering Now - A History of The Specials, 1995, ST Publishing, ISBN 1-898927-25-1
- In Defence Of Ska, 2021, Clash Books, Contributor ISBN 1944866787
- You're Wondering Now - The Specials From conception to reunion, 2009, Cherry Red Books
- The Skapones - Way Out West - 2019, The Specials & Stuff..., 2022, Cosa Nostra Books ISBN 979-8483105947
