= An Appeal to All that Doubt =

1742 work by William Law

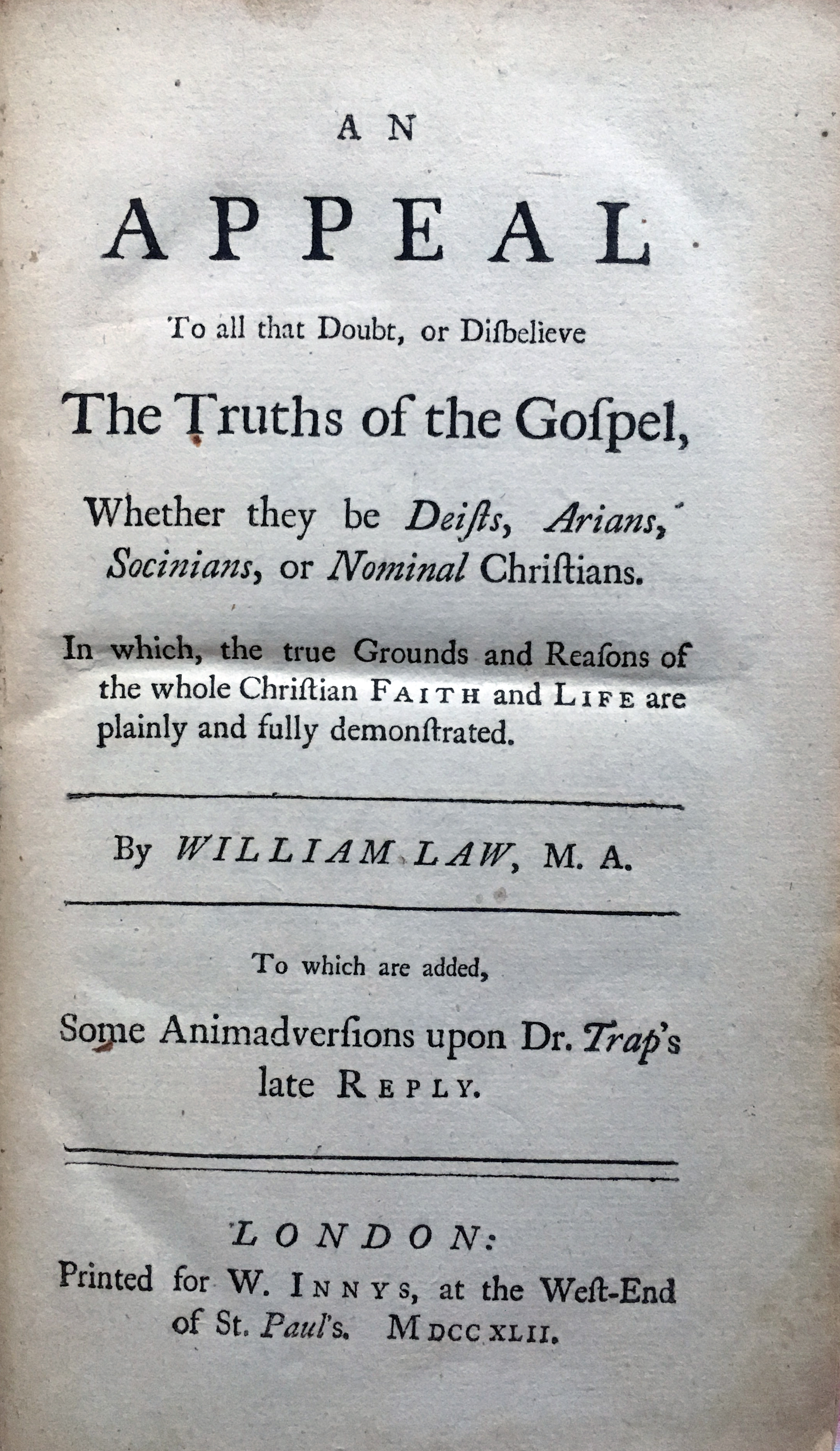
An Appeal to All That Doubt by William Law, first edition, 1742

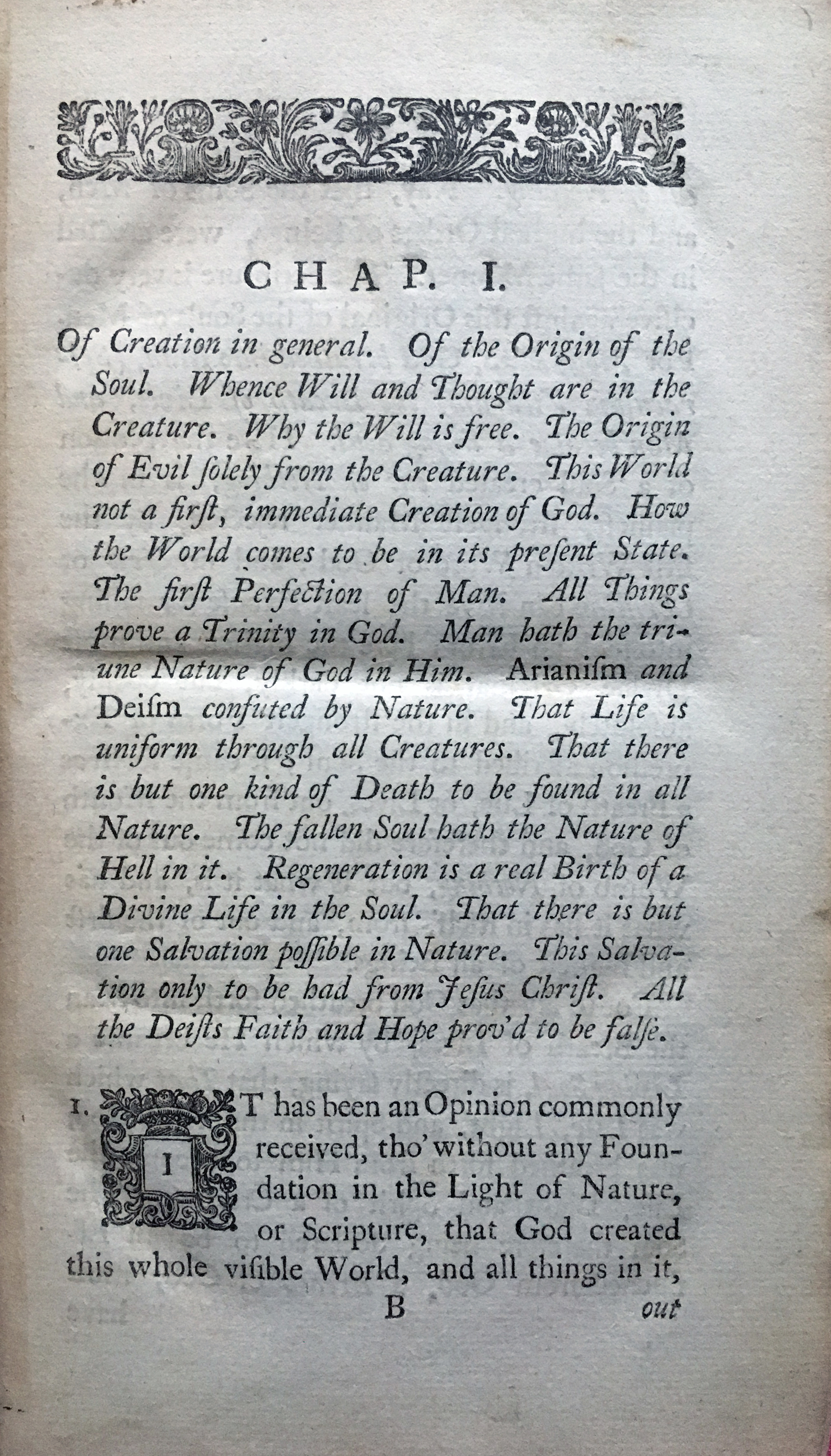
An Appeal to All That Doubt by William Law, 1742, first page

An Appeal to all that Doubt or Disbelieve the Truths of the Gospel, whether they be Deists, Arians, Socinians, or nominal Christians, or An Appeal for short, was written by William Law in 1742. Law lived in the Age of Enlightenment centering on reason in which there were controversies between Catholics and Protestants, Deists, Socinians, Arians etc. which caused conflicts that worried him. The Appeal was heavily influenced by the works of the seventeenth-century German philosopher, Lutheran theologian and mystic writer Jakob Boehme.

Jakob Boehme's works appeared between 1612 and 1624, the year of his death, and the sixth year into the Thirty Years' War, a very destructive conflict in Central Europe between 1618 and 1648, which had initially been a war between various Catholic and Protestant states. It became however more a war fought for political superiority. It was ended by the Peace of Westphalia in 1648.

Boehme's books were translated by John Sparrow and John Ellistone into English between 1645 and 1662, right in the middle of the English Civil War (1642–1651) and the trial and execution of King Charles I.

The first edition An Appeal was printed in 1742 for the distinguished William Innys, bookseller in London. It contains a statement of William Law's mystical theology and consists of three chapters filled with beautiful prose.

== Introduction to An Appeal ==
Aldous Huxley described Law as a great philosopher and theologian of mysticism. He considered Law as an "illuminating guide for many who seek God in nature and in the depths of the soul". Stephen Hobhouse stated that Law remained loyal throughout his life to the sacraments and institutions of the Anglican Church, in spite of his later leanings towards the Quakers and their pacifist faith. In the Atonement passages Law asserted the function of Christ as our great example of a good life and the only method of overcoming evil, not by anger or force and punishment, but by love, patience and spiritual not physical resistance. For to Law and to Boehme "Atonement' was first and foremost "at-one-ment", the rebirth of a new sinless life in the soul and its reunion with God. This concept, so Hobhouse wrote, will seem unsatisfactory to those people who believe in "guilt, righteous anger, retributive punishment, compensatory justice and sacrificial death.

Hobhouse mentioned several possibly bewildering passages in Law's books, which are also found in the works of Boehme. Hobhouse refers here to Boehme's concept of the "seven forms or properties of nature", to the mythology of the fall of the angels from heaven and to Adam's fall from "a first perfect and androgynous life. Hobhouse's advice is therefore to skip these passages in Law's works, for the fine spirituality of Boehme was often obscured by the "physico-chemical, medical, alchemistic, and astrological language which [Boehme] often employed".

== Reception of An Appeal ==
An Appeal was well received by many of Law's contemporaries and his friends. There is a letter from the physician and Behmenist George Cheyne to the printer and novelist Samuel Richardson, dated March 9, 1742 in which Cheyne enthusiastically asked Richardson whether he had "seen Law's Appeal?" and Cheyne described The Appeal as "admirable and unanswerable". An Appeal is divided into three chapters each of which is preceded by a short summary.

== Chapter I ==
At the beginning of the first chapter of An Appeal Law wrote the following summary:

Of creation in general. Of the origin of the soul. Whence will and thoughts are in the creature. Why the will is free. The origin of evil solely from the creature. This world not a first, immediate creation of God. How the world comes to be in its present state. The first perfection of Man. All things prove a Trinity in God. Man hath the triune nature of God in him. Arianism and Deism confuted by nature. That life is uniform through all creatures. That there is but one kind of death to be found in nature. The fallen soul hath the nature of hell in it. Regeneration is a real birth of a divine life in the soul. That there is but one salvation possible in nature. This salvation only to be had from Jesus Christ. All the deist's faith and hope proved to be false.

Some essential words need some further explanation, such as "spirit" (spiritus: breath, air or wind, symbolic of the third person of the Trinity) and "spark" (scintilla animae) used by many mystics as a spark in the soul which may catch fire from the flame of God's love and goodness, if so desired.

=== One Religion Common To All Mankind ===
For Law there was, is and will always be just one religion for all mankind, as we all have the same nearness to God and as we are all equally His children. The modern reader has to bear in mind that with "Man" and "Mankind" Law refers to both men and women, since according to Law there is no difference between men and women for God. The same applies to the word "son" or "sons" which Law sometimes uses in his texts.

Man, all mankind, stand in the same nearness of relation to God, are all equally his children, are all under the same necessity of paying the same homage of love and obedience to Him, all fitted to receive the same blessing and happiness from Him, all created for the same eternal enjoyment of His love and presence with them, all equally called to worship and adore Him in spirit and truth, all equally able of seeking and finding Him, of having a blessed union and communion with Him. These great truths, the first pillars of all true and spiritual religion, on which the holy and divine lives of the ancient patriarchs was supported, by which they worshipped God in a true and right faith ... plainly declared in the Mosaic writings. No writer, whether Jewish or Christian, has so plainly ... laid open ... the necessity of an eternal, never ceasing relation between God, and all human nature ... has incontestably asserted the immortality of the soul, or spirit of man, and ... proved the necessity of one religion, common to all human nature.

=== Law's View of Evil ===
Law wrote that it was evident that there was evil in this world in all its parts, but he was convinced that God did not create evil, neither natural or moral. Therefore, he argued, that this world in its current state and condition was not the first and original creation of God:

This [world] is in a corrupt, disordered state, full of grossness, disease, impurity, wrath, death and darkness, [which is] as evident, as there is light, beauty, order and harmony everywhere to be found in it. Therefore it is as impossible, that this outward state and condition of things should be a first and immediate work of God, as that there should be good and evil in God Himself. All storms and tempests, every fierceness of heat, every wrath of cold proves with the same certainty, that outward nature is not a first work of God, as the selfishness, envy, pride, wrath and malice of devils, and men proves, that they are not in the first state of their creation. .... The present condition of this world is only the remains or ruins, first, of a Heaven spoiled by the fall of Angels, and then of a Paradise lost by the sin of Man. .... Man and the world in which he lives, lie both in the same state of disorder and impurity, have both the same marks of Life and Death in them, both bring forth the same sort of evils, both want a Redeemer, and have need of the same kind of Death and Resurrection, before they can come to their first state of purity and perfection.

Qualities that are good, or even perfect, become evil when they are separated from light and love (God) with which they should be united, argues Law. This is according to him the true origin of all evil in the creation, without the least imputation upon God. He compares it with fruit:

If a delicious, fragrant Fruit had a power of separating itself from that rich spirit, fine taste, smell and colour which it receives from the virtue of the sun, and the spirit of the air; or if it could in the beginning of its growth, turn away from the sun, and receive no virtue from it, then it would stand in its own first birth of wrath, sourness, bitterness, and astringency, just as the devils do, who have turned back into their own dark root, and rejected the light and spirit of God.

=== The Ground of the Most Fundamental Doctrine of Scripture ===
For William Law the most fundamental doctrine of the Scripture is that the Father is the Creator, the Son the Redeemer, and the Holy Spirit the Sanctifier. As there are three in God, there must be three in the creature, and here one finds, so argues Law, the "true, and easy, and sound, and edifying knowledge and belief of the mystery of a Trinity in Unity".

=== The Fall of Man Necessitates a New Birth (a Regeneration) ===
Law believed that Man was created in his original perfection and that the Holy Trinity was his Creator; but when Man was fallen, or had lost his first divine life, there began a new language of a redeeming religion. As a result, according to "the very outward letter and inward truth of the most important articles of the Christian Religion" man has to "born again of the Word, or Son of God, being born of the Spirit of God" in order to enter the Kingdom of Heaven. And this means, so writes Law, that the "triune Life of God" must first be born in us before "we can enter into the triune, beatific Life, or Presence of God". This Law compares with the state of the penitent returning prodigal son, "weary of his own sinful, shameful nature and desiring to renounce the world, the flesh and the devil.".

=== Free Choice ===
Law believed that every creature must have a "power of joining with or departing from God ... therefore no creature can have its state or condition fixed, till it gives itself up either wholly unto God, or turns wholly from him". And this is the cause and origin of evil, viz. being absolutely and eternally separated from God.

=== Address to Arians and Deists ===
Law addressed Arians and deists to turn away from their opinions:

If you are an Arian, don't content yourself with the numbers that are with you, or with a learned name or two that are on your side ... nothing but a poor, groping, purblind philosophy, that is not able to look either at God, nature or creature, has ever led any man into it. .... There is a threefold life in God and everything that is, whether it be happy or miserable, perfect or imperfect, is only so, because it has, or has not, the triune nature of God in it. .... If you are a Deist, made so, either by the disorderly state of your own heart, or by prejudices taken from the corruptions and divisions of Christianity, or from a dislike of the language of Scripture, or from an opinion of the sufficiency of a religion of human reason, or from whatever else it may be, look well to yourself, Christianity is no fiction of enthusiasm, or invention of priests.

=== The Difference between a Fallen Soul and a Lost Soul ===
For Law there is only one difference between a fallen soul and a lost soul, they are both in the same need of a Saviour which leads to a new birth or regeneration, but the one [the fallen soul] has the offer of the Saviour, whereas the other (the lost soul) has refused to accept Him. The rebirth or regeneration will bring his soul back into the Kingdom of Heaven. He adds later that:

The Gospel says, unless the fallen soul be born again from above, be born again of the Word or Son, and the Spirit of God, it cannot see, nor enter into the Kingdom of Heaven. .... Nothing is, or can possibly be salvation, but this regenerated life of the soul.

Since there is "no partiality in God", this salvation through Jesus Christ, so argues Law, was given "through all ages, and in all countries, from the first Patriarchs to the end of the world". He is the "Light that lights every man that comes into the world, and therefore when people consider the Gospel as "narrowing the way of Salvation", they misunderstand "the whole nature of the Christian redemption".

=== Creatures [Animals], Angels and Men ===
Law explains that every free creature (animals) must have and find its own nature in this or that state, "as a birth from the free working of his own will" as a result of which "no creature [animal] of this world can commit sin, ... because (animals) have no will that is superior to nature". Their will is the will of nature and they are always doing what comes natural to them, as a result of which they are not sinful. But, so argues Law, the will of angels and men is an "offspring or ray" which is derived from the will of God and this will of God is superior to nature. Therefore, the nature of the devil and the nature of fallen man is imputed to both of them as their sin ... because their will was uncontrollable."

Law ends the first chapter with the following words:

Therefore, O Man! Look well to thyself, and see what birth thou art bringing forth, what nature is growing up in thee, and be assured that stand thou must in that state of nature, which the working of thy own will has brought forth in thee, whether it be happy or miserable [heaven or hell is within thee]. Expect no arbitrary goodness of God toward thee, when thou leavest this world; for that must grow for ever which hath grown here. .... The free grace and mercy by which we are said in the Scripture to be saved, is not an arbitrary good will in God which saves whom he pleases; as a prince may forgive some and not forgive others, merely through his own sovereign grace and favour. .... Let no man therefore trust to be saved at the last day, by any arbitrary Goodness, or free grace of God; for salvation is, and can be nothing else, but the having put off all that is damnable and hellish in our nature.

== Chapter II ==
At the beginning of the second chapter of An Appeal Law wrote the following summary:

Of eternal and temporal nature. How nature is from God, and the scene of His action. How the creatures are out of it. Temporal nature created out of that which is eternal. The fallen angels brought the first disorder into nature. This world created to repair those disorders. Whence good and evil is in everything of this world. How heaven and hell make up the whole of this world. How the fire of this world differs from eternal fire; and the matter of this world from the materiality of heaven. Eternal nature is the Kingdom of Heaven, the beatific manifestation of the triune God. God is mere love and goodness. How wrath and anger come to be ascribed to Him. Of fire in general. Of the unbeginning fire. Of the spirituality of fire. How fire comes to be in material things. Whence the possibility of kindling fire in the things of this world. Every man is, and must be the kindler of his own eternal fire, etc.

=== This Temporal World Is a Poor, Miserable Mixture of Good and Evil ===
An important question that Law set forth is why "eternal nature was so degraded, debased and changed from its eternal state of perfection". He cannot imagine anyone saying that God of his own will changed eternal nature, "his majestic Kingdom of Heaven", into this "poor, miserable mixture of good and evil, into this poor state of division, grossness, death and darkness". Law explained the answer why there is "good and evil throughout all temporal nature and creature" as follows:

Because all this temporary nature is a creation out of that strife of evil against good which the fallen angels had brought into their kingdom. .... Evil and good was in the angelic kingdom as soon as they set their wills and desires contrary to God and the divine life. .... Now the good and evil that is in this world is that same good and evil, and in the same strife that it was in the kingdom of the fallen angels. .... The evils that are in this world are the evils of hell that are tending to be nothing else but hell; they are the remains of the sin and poison of the fallen angels. The good that is in this world are the sparks of life that are to generate heaven.

This is why one has to resist evil "in any kind, under every shape and colour", so that the life and light of heaven may rise up in oneself and God's Kingdom may come "and His will be done in all nature and creature".

Everything that is disagreeable and horrible in this life, everything that can afflict and terrify our senses, all the kinds of natural and moral evil are only so much of the nature, effects and manifestation of hell: for hell and evil are only two words for one and the same thing. .... On the other hand, all that is sweet, delightful and amiable in this world, in the serenity of the air, the fineness of the seasons, the joy of light, the melody of sounds, the beauty of colours, the fragrancy of smells, the splendour of precious stones, is nothing else but heaven breaking through the veil of this world.

== Chapter III ==
At the beginning of the third chapter of An Appeal Law wrote the following summary:

The true ground of all the doctrines of the gospel discovered. Why Adam could make no atonement for his sins. Why and how Jesus Christ alone could make this atonement. Whence the shedding of blood for the remission of sins [crucifixion of Christ]. What wrath and anger it is, that is quenched and atoned by the blood of Christ. Of the last suffering of Christ. Why and how we must eat the flesh and drink the blood of Jesus Christ.

=== The Atonement (Redemption) and the Eucharist (The Holy Sacrament of the Lord's or Last Supper) ===
In this third chapter Law shows the reader all the objections which "Deists, Arians and Socinians have brought against the first articles of Christian faith", but he will also explain his own view of the suffering of Christ. It is not by an "arbitrary discretionary pleasure of God" who would accept the sufferings of an innocent person as a "sufficient amends or satisfaction for the sins of criminals". God is reconciled to us, so Law argues, through Jesus Christ insofar as we are newly born, newly created in Jesus Christ. He saved us not by "giving the merit of his innocent sufferings as a full payment for our [sins]" but by enabling us to come out of our "guilt and iniquities" by having his nature reborn into us. To be redeemed, Law is convinced that there is an absolute necessity that "our souls [will be] clothed again with this first paradisaical or heavenly flesh and blood" without which we can never enter into the Kingdom of Heaven. This heavenly flesh and blood must be born again in us, or derived again into us from this blood of Christ. This drinking of the blood of Christ, the second Adam, is only saying that it "must do that for us and in us, which the first Adam should have done". Law admonishes the reader not to look for a figurative meaning of the words "flesh and blood". The flesh and blood does not refer to the "outward, visible, mortal flesh and blood of Christ, but a heavenly, immortal flesh and blood which "came down from heaven" and which has the nature, qualities and life of heaven in it, the "flesh and blood of eternal life" which brings heaven and immortality again into us. Law warns:

Woe be to those who come to it with the mouths of beasts, and the minds of serpents! Who with impertinent hearts, devoted to the lusts of the flesh, the lusts of the eyes, and the pride of life, for worldly ends, outward appearances, and secular conformity, boldly meddle with those mysteries that are only to be approached by those that are of a pure heart and who worship God in spirit and in truth.

This is according to Law the plain and full truth of the "most mysterious part" of the Holy Sacrament, disentangled by him from the tedious strife of words and that "thickness of darkness" which so many learned contenders on all sides brought into it. Law preserved the letter and the spirit of Scripture. And here Law ends An Appeal to All Who Doubt or Disbelieve the Truth of the Gospel.

== The Publication Date of the First Edition of An Appeal is 1742 ==
There has been some confusion as to the publication date of the first edition of William Law's An Appeal as a result of which for a long time 1740 has been assumed to have been the publication date for the first edition. However, the first edition appeared in 1742, a second edition in 1756 and a third edition in 1768. This confusion was probably caused by John Henry Overton (1835–1903). He was an English cleric and a church historian who, together with his college friend Charles John Abbey, published in 1878 The English Church in the Eighteenth Century, in two volumes. Overton also published William Law, Nonjuror and Mystic, in 1881 in which he gave 1740 as the publication date of the first edition of the Appeal. He wrote:

The Answer to Dr. Trapp appeared in the early part of 1740. Later in the same year Law published one of the most comprehensive and important of all his mystic works. It is entitled in full, An Appeal to all that Doubt or Disbelieve the Truths of the Gospel, whether they be Deists, Arians, Socinians, or nominal Christians.

The Moreton edition of The Works of William Law in nine volumes of 1892–1893 by G. Moreton also used 1740 as the date of the first edition of An Appeal. Subsequently, Stephen Hobhouse using the "Moreton edition" as a "trustworthy reprint … following the original editions" for his Selected Mystical of William Law (1938), equally quoted 1740 as the publication date of the first edition of An Appeal.

== Publication dates of An Appeal ==
The first edition of William Law's Appeal appeared in 1742. It was printed for W. Innys who was a bookseller at the West-End of St. Paul's, London. The second edition of 1756 was printed for W. Innys and J. Richardson, in Pater-Noster Row, London. The third edition of 1768 was printed for Robinson and Roberts at 25 Pater-Noster Row, London. The complete Works of William Law which appeared in nine volumes were printed for J. Richardson, 1762, London. This collected work consists of various editions of the individual books of William Law. The dates on the individual title pages range from 1753 to 1776. The sixth Volume contained the third edition of An Appeal from 1768 which had been printed for Robinson and Roberts, 25 Pater-Noster Row, London. There also was a later edition of The Works of 1762 published in 1780, consisting of various other editions of Law's Works.
