= UR Group =

Italian esotericist organization

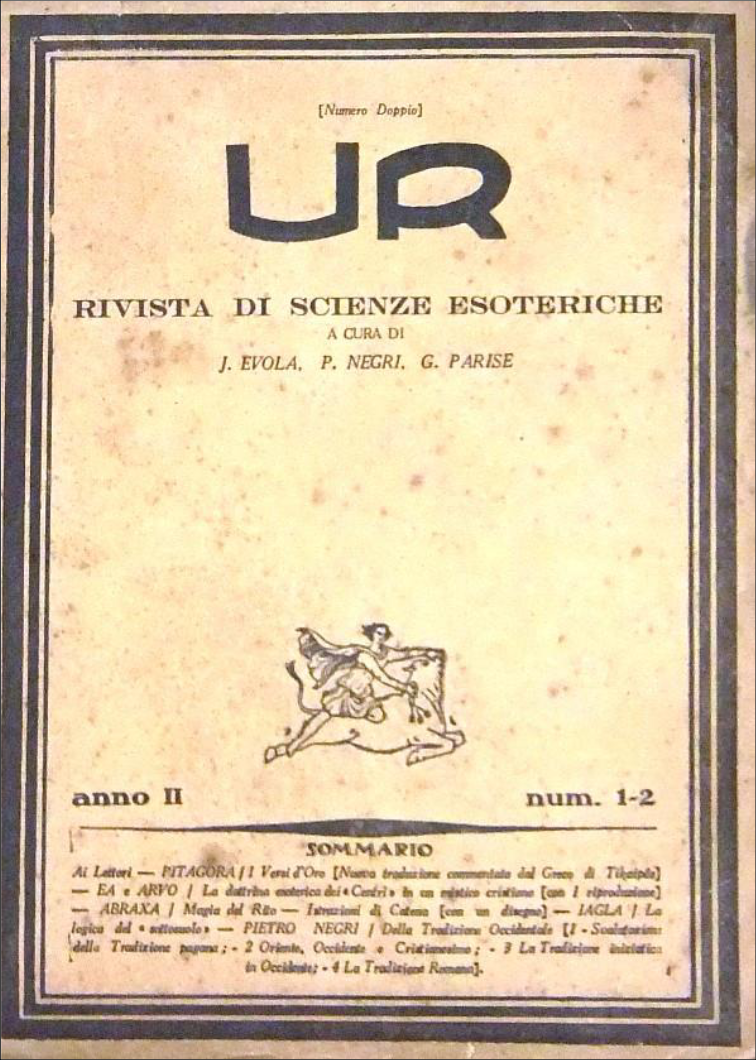
Cover of the magazine UR in 1928

UR Group (Italian: Gruppo di Ur) was an Italian esotericist association, founded around 1927 by intellectuals including Julius Evola, Arturo Reghini and Giovanni Colazza for the study of Traditionalism and Magic. They published monthly series of issues in UR (1927–28) and KRUR (1929) journals, reprinted in the three volumes of the book Introduzione alla Magia quale Scienza dell'Io [Introduction to Magic as Science of the Self] in 1955 and 1971.

== History ==
The UR Group was founded by Julius Evola. His original purpose was to use magical means in an attempt to influence Benito Mussolini to abandon populism and instead create an aristocratic regime based on ancient Roman virtues. Among the first collaborators were the freemason Arturo Reghini, follower of the neo-Pythagoreanism of the Rocco Armentano's "Schola Italica", his pupil Giulio Parise, and the anthroposophist Giovanni Colazza, a disciple of Rudolf Steiner, belonging to the tradition of Christian esotericism. They gathered various seekers devoted to initiate asceticism, united by the sharing of similar esoteric studies, to revitalize the perennial tradition of the ancient sacred mysteries.

Julius Evola was the first editor of the magazine UR. The size of the Group has remained hidden but it is estimated between twelve and fifteen people. Evola rapidly expanded his influence on the Group's magazine, to the point of ousting Arturo Reghini and his disciple Giulio Parise from the management at the end of 1928. Strong personal disagreements with Parise had in fact led to a split in the group itself, after which, in January 1929, Evola founded a new magazine called KRUR. Reghini's support for Freemasonry would prove a bone of contention for Evola, who accused him of wanting to put the magazine under the direct control of the Grand Orient of Italy.

The UR Group declared itself independent of esoteric schools or tendencies formed in modern and contemporary times, referring, if anything, to a universal Tradition prior to particular doctrinal forms. In addition to Hermetists and Kremmerzians, were also accepted within it some Catholics and a significant component of Steinerians, whose anthroposophy undoubtedly inspires most of the members of the Group.

Operating branches of the Group were established in Rome and in other cities of Italy, the so-called "chains", based on common intentions and practices, mainly employing the anthroposophical exercises taught by Steiner for spiritual development, as well as techniques from Buddhist, Tantric and rare Hermetic texts.

=== Name ===
The name of the group comes from the phonetic expression u-r, existing in the Chaldean and in the Runic with the meaning of fire and bull or ram respectively, as well as a prefix "ur-" in German to indicate something primal, ancestral.

== Magazines ==
In the magazines, expressions of the works within the Ur Group, the authors of the articles signed themselves with a pseudonym, because they preferred to spread their thought rather than advertise their own person. The magazine's director was Julius Evola as it appears on the 1927 cover; together with the "curators" Pietro Negri (alias Arturo Reghini) and Giulio Parise in the cover of 1928; again and only Evola in 1929, when the magazine's name was changed to KRUR.

Each of the three publication years corresponds to one of the three volumes of the work Introduction to Magic as Science of the Ego reprinted in 1955 and 1971.

Several hermetic-alchemical texts such as the Turba philosophorum, or Gichtel's Theosophia practica were published in the journals of UR and KRUR, and others of a philosophical and ritual nature from various sources.

=== Members ===
The pseudonyms behind which the members of the Ur Group hid were partly revealed by the researches of Gianfranco de Turris, and Renato Del Ponte. Below a list of those who collaborated with the magazines of UR and KRUR (in brackets their symbolic name used to sign, according to the idea of 'active impersonality'):

- Giovanni Colazza (Leo, and possibly Breno and Krur), anthroposophist, direct disciple of Rudolf Steiner.
- Giovanni Antonio Colonna (Breno and Krur, or Arvo), anthroposophist.
- Girolamo Comi (Gic), Catholic poet, friend of Arturo Onofri.
- Guido De Giorgio (Havismat), Catholic, first close to the thought of René Guénon, then follower of Pius of Pietrelcina.
- Aniceto Del Massa (Sagittarius), friend and disciple of Arturo Reghini, Pythagorean, later anthroposophist.
- Julius Evola (Agarda, Arvo, Ea, Iagla).
- Nicola Moscardelli (Sirio, Sirius), Catholic poet inspired by Onofri's poetics.
- Roggero Musmeci Ferrari Bravo (Ignis), whose name does not appear in magazines, however.
- Arturo Onofri (Oso), poet, anthroposophist.
- Giulio Parise (Luce), Freemason.
- Ercole Quadrelli (Abraxa, Tikaipos), Kremmerzian.
- Arturo Reghini (Pietro Negri, once Henìocos Àristos), Pythagorean and Freemason.
- Corallo Reginelli (Taurulus), first anthroposophist, then hermetist.
- Domenico Rudatis (Rud), mountaineer and esotericist.
- Massimo Scaligero (Maximus), anthroposophist, direct disciple of Giovanni Colazza.
- Emilio Servadio (Es), psychoanalyst, poet.

Other people, whose identity is unknown, signed with the pseudonyms of: Alba, Apro, Arom, Nilius, Primo Sole, Zam. Another enigmatic name, Ekatlos, is attributable to a lady, or perhaps to Leone Caetani. In the magazine Krur also wrote Agnostus, behind which the French esotericist René Guénon is probably hidden.

== Works ==
=== English translations ===
- Evola, Julius; The UR Group (2001). Moynihan, Michael (ed.). Introduction to Magic: Rituals and Practical Techniques for the Magus. Vol. I. Translated by Guido Stucco. Rochester, VT: Inner Traditions/Bear. ISBN 978-0-89281-624-8.
- Evola, Julius; The UR Group (2019). Hakl, Hans Thomas (ed.). Introduction to Magic: The Path of Initiatic Wisdom. Vol. II. Translated by Joscelyn Godwin. Rochester, VT: Simon and Schuster. ISBN 978-1-62055-718-1.
- Evola, Julius; The UR Group (2021). Hakl, Hans Thomas (ed.). Introduction to Magic: Realizations of the Absolute Individual. Vol. III. Translated by Joscelyn Godwin. Rochester, VT: Simon and Schuster. ISBN 978-1-62055-720-4.

== See also ==
- Amedeo Rocco Armentano
- Hermeticism (poetry)
- Neopythagoreanism
- Roman Traditional Movement
- Pietas Comunità Gentile
- Urreligion
