= Arturo Reghini =

Italian mathematician and philosopher (1878–1946)

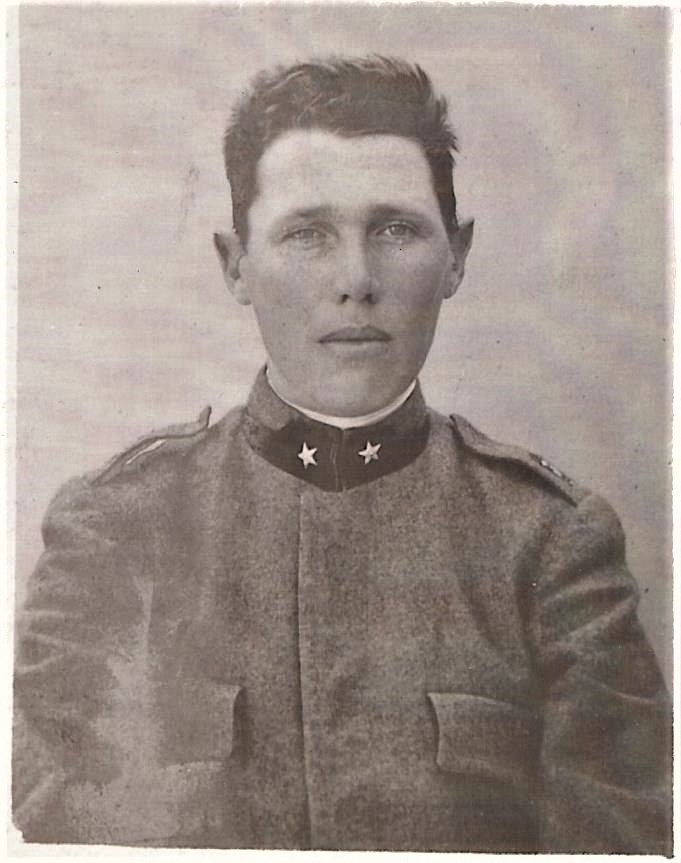
- Reghini in military uniform
- Born: 12 November 1878; Florence, Kingdom of Italy
- Died: 1 July 1946 (aged 67); Budrio, Italy

Education
- Education: University of Pisa
- Academic advisor: Amedeo Rocco Armentano

Philosophical work
- Era: 20th-century philosophy
- Region: Western philosophy
- School: Neo-Pythagoreanism; Traditionalism
- Notable students: Julius Evola
- Main interests: Western esotericism, philosophy of mathematics

Arturo Reghini (12 November 1878 – 1 July 1946) was an Italian mathematician, philosopher and esotericist.

== Biography ==
Arturo Reghini was born in Florence on 12 November 1878. In 1898, he became a member of the Theosophical Society for which he founded a section in Rome. In 1903, he published in Palermo the first books of the editorial series named Biblioteca Teosofica (Theosophical Library) and later Biblioteca filosofica). In the same year, he was initiated in the Memphis' rite, a Masonic spiritual path that is derived by the ancient Egyptians and in Italy is uniquely practised in Palermo. In 1907, he was admitted to the regular Scottish Rite Masonic Lodge "Lucifero" in Florence, affiliated to the Grand Orient of Italy. Subsequently, Reghini adhered for a short period to the Martinism of Gérard Encausse and started to report the errors of the lawyer and Grand Master Sacchi about his administration of the Italian Freemasonry, also confuting his publications.

In 1907, Amedeo Rocco Armentano introduced Reghini to the knowledge of the Pythagoreanism. In 1912, Reghini was in the directorate of the Italian Freemasonry (in Italian: Supremo Consiglio Universale of the Rito filosofico italiano) from which he resigned in 1940 with a strongly negative judgement about the national brotherhood.

In 1921, he was initiated to the 33rd and highest degree of the Scottish Rite. Then he was elected as effective member of the Supremo Consiglio d'Italia of which he became the Great Commendor and the General Secretary. In 1925, Reghini signed the internal decree No 245 related to its termination. On May 19, the Italian Parliament had approved the law of reform for the freedom of association, banning the masonic lodges out of the country.

Reghini edited the journals Atanór (1924) and Ignis (1925) devoted to initiate studies, covering topics such as Pythagoreanism, yoga, Hebrew Cabalism and the Freemasonry of Alessandro Cagliostro. A circle of esotericists formed around these journals and adopted the name Gruppo di Ur. The group's members included Julius Evola and the anthroposophists Giovanni Colazza and Giovanni Antonio Colonna di Cesarò. From 1927 to 1928 the group published the monthly journal UR. Reghini fell out with Evola and the Ur Group in 1928; a major reason was Reghini's support for Freemasonry, which was not in line with the direction the journal had taken. Reghini left the editorial board and UR was discontinued. It was briefly replaced in 1929 by a journal named Krur, without Reghini's involvement.

Reghini was opposed to Christianity, which he associated with modernity and egalitarianism, and sought to establish a form of modern Paganism he called "magia colta", "cultured magic", which he drew from Hermeticism and Platonism. A critic of democracy and an advocate for the ancient Roman aristocracy, Reghini welcomed the rise of Italian Fascism, which he associated with the ancient world. He wrote in Atanór in 1924 that he had anticipated the emergence of such a regime in Italy 15 years prior. From the second half of the 1920s, he wrote critically about clerical fascism and the increasing fascist hostility towards non-Catholic religious views. He adopted an ironic writing style associated with the anti-clericalism of the era before World War I and the Risorgimento.

Reghini died in Budrio on 1 July 1946.

== Legacy ==
Reghini was an important influence on Evola during the years 1924 to 1930. He introduced Evola to the major texts on alchemy, which became the basis for Evola's book The Hermetic Tradition (1931). It was also through Reghini that Evola came in contact with René Guénon, whose Traditionalism would have a profound impact on his thinking. Reghini's journals and the works of the Ur group have influenced the development of Italic-Roman neopaganism and Roman polytheistic reconstructionism.

== Bibliography ==
- Le parole sacre e di passo dei primi tre gradi ed il massimo mistero massonico, Atanor, Rome, 1922.
- Per la restituzione della geometria pitagorica (1935); new edition Il Basilisco, Genoa, 1988, which also includes I numeri sacri nella tradizione pitagorica; new title Numeri sacri e geometria pitagorica.
- Il fascio littorio, ovvero il simbolismo duodecimale e il fascio etrusco (1935); new edition Il Basilisco, Genoa, 1980.
- Dei Numeri pitagorici (Libri sette) (1940) – Prologo – Associazione culturale Ignis, 2004.
- Dei Numeri Pitagorici (Libri sette) – Parte Prima – Volume Primo – Dell'equazione indeterminata di secondo grado con due incognite – Archè/pizeta, 2006.
- Dei Numeri Pitagorici (Libri sette) – Parte Prima – Volume Secondo – Delle soluzioni primitive dell'equazione di tipo Pell x^{2} − Dy^{2} = B e del loro numero – Archè/pizeta, 2012.
- Dizionario Filologico, ("Associazione culturale Ignis"), 2008.
- Cagliostro, ("Associazione culturale Ignis"), 2007.
- Considerazioni sul Rituale dell'apprendista libero muratore, Phoenix, Genoa, 1978.
- Paganesimo, Pitagorismo, Massoneria, Mantinea, Furnari (Messina), 1986.
- Per la restituzione della Massoneria Pitagorica Italiana, introduction by Vinicio Serino, Raffaelli Editore, Rimini, 2005, ISBN 88-89642-01-7
- La Tradizione Pitagorica Massonica, Fratelli Melita Editori, Genoa, 1988, ISBN 88-403-9155-X
- Trascendenza di Spazio e Tempo, "Mondo Occulto", Napoli, 1926, reprint Libreria Ed. ASEQ 2010.

Selected translations with introductions and annotations:

- De occulta philosophia by Heinrich Cornelius Agrippa (Alberto Fidi, Milan, 1926; two volumes); reprinted by Edizioni Mediterranee and I Dioscuri, Genoa, 1988.
- Le Roi du Monde by René Guénon (Alberto Fidi editore, Milan, 1927).

== See also ==
- Julius Evola
- Giuliano Kremmerz
- Giustiniano Lebano
- Occult Imperium
- Reconstructionist Roman religion
