= Occult Imperium =

2022 book by Christian Giudice

Occult Imperium: Arturo Reghini, Roman Traditionalism and the Anti-Modern Reaction in Fascist Italy
- Author: Christian Giudice
- Language: English
- Series: Oxford Studies in Western Esotericism
- Subject: Arturo Reghini, Roman Traditionalism
- Publisher: Oxford University Press
- Publication date: 2022
- Media type: Print (hardcover)
- Pages: 328
- ISBN: 978-0197610244

Occult Imperium: Arturo Reghini, Roman Traditionalism and the Anti-Modern Reaction in Fascist Italy is a book by historian Christian Giudice published by Oxford University Press in 2022. The work is based on Giudice's doctoral dissertation which he completed at the University of Gothenburg in 2016, under the supervision of Henrik Bogdan and Marco Pasi.

== Content ==
The book covers the life and work of Italian esotericist Arturo Reghini (1878–1946). It contextualizes Reghini and his so-called "Roman Traditionalism" against several intersecting historical forces and influences like the Risorgimento, Spiritualism, Freemasonry, Guénonian Traditionalism and Italian Fascism.

There has been considerable discussion regarding Reghini's early involvement with the Theosophical Society. Previous scholarship has tended to either propose a break between Reghini's early years and his later Traditionalism, or characterize his theosophical years as a sort of naive youthful error. On the basis of new material, Giudice instead proposes a continuity between both, with Reghini's early Theosophical phase acting "as a necessary stepping stone" toward his later Roman Traditionalism.

In the book, Giudice gives an analysis of the unpublished correspondences between Reghini and the French esotericist René Guénon (1886–1951). He argues that the correspondence is evidence of a mutual influence between both intellectuals. Ultimately, he argues that the influence of Reghini on Guénon was the most significant, thus highlighting him as a key figure in the birth of Traditionalism as a religious movement.

== Reception ==
Scholar of esotericism Hans Thomas Hakl has written a generally positive review of the doctoral dissertation which formed the basis of the book. However, he did note that, in his opinion, too little attention was paid to the actual content of Reghini's esotericism.

Historian Mark Sedgwick called the book "an important contribution", which offers a revealing insight into Italian esoteric milieu of the twentieth century. Sedgwick has emphasized how an understanding of Reghini, Roman Traditionalism and this broader Italian esoteric milieu can be crucial for the study of the influential esotericist Julius Evola.

Historian Peter Staudenmaier called Occult Imperium an important but flawed book. His review especially found fault with the way Giudice handled source criticism, relying on political police records in portraying the relationship between Reghini and the Fascist regime. He noted Giudice "may have misunderstood the function of the anonymous informant reports that make up the bulk of such dossiers; they are an inherently unreliable genre, continually concocting inaccurate allegations".

Historian Davide Marino praised the book for its clarity of style and informative nature, but criticised the book for inaccurately characterizing the early Guénon.

A reviewer for the journal Correspondences was generally positive about the book, but found its overall analysis of the relationship between occultism and modernity "somewhat underwhelming".

== See also ==
- Reconstructionist Roman religion
