= George Cheyne (physician) =

Scottish physician (1672–1743)

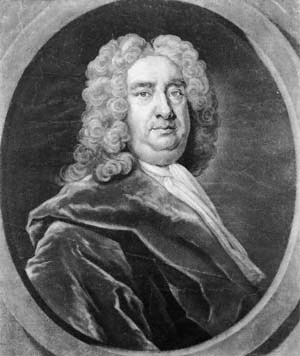
- Born: 1672; Methlick Aberdeenshire, Scotland
- Died: 1743 (aged 70–71)
- Occupation: physician
- Known for: vegetarianism

George Cheyne, MD, FRCS Ed., FRS, (1672–1743), was a Scottish physician, early proto-psychiatrist, philosopher and mathematician.

== Life ==
George Cheyne was a Newtonian physician and Behmenist, deeply immersed in mysticism. Born in 1672 in Methlick, near Aberdeen in Scotland, he was baptized in Mains of Kelly, Methlick, Aberdeenshire, on 24 February 1673. He died in Bath on 12 April 1743. The books he published during his life show his wide interest which extended from medicine and natural philosophy to religion, metaphysics, astronomy and mathematics. His books were mostly very successful and as a result they were translated into other languages, e.g. Latin, Dutch, French, Italian and German. The printer and author Samuel Richardson printed several of his books. Among many others Thomas Gray, Samuel Johnson, John Wesley, John Byrom and Edward Young liked his work. His clients included Alexander Pope, John Gay and Samuel Richardson. Today he is best known for his contribution to vegetarianism.

Cheyne was acquainted with Sir Isaac Newton and provoked Newton to publish his Quadratures and with it, his Light & Colours. Newton later offered him financial support to publish Fluxionum methodus inversa (The Inverse Method of Fluxions), but apparently he turned down the offer. Newton refused to see him any more.

Cheyne did not believe that the present state of things is "from all Eternity". Using the metaphor of "a Piece of Clock-work", he argues that when a thing depends upon another thing as its cause, this implies that “the first thing exists that the second may exist”. He adds: "remove the sun and there will be no fruit, take away the moon and the seas would stagnate, destroy our Atmosphere and we should swell like poison´d Rats". Therefore, it is absolutely impossible, according to Cheyne, that “any of the Species of Animals or Vegetables should have existed from all Eternity”.

Cheyne also wrote on fevers, nervous disorders, and hygiene. In 1740 he wrote The Essay on Regimen and this work is often quoted by vegetarians and animal rights activists, particularly the following passage:

To see the convulsions, agonies and tortures of a poor fellow-creature, whom they cannot restore nor recompense, dying to gratify luxury and tickle callous and rank organs, must require a rocky heart, and a great degree of cruelty and ferocity. I cannot find any great difference between feeding on human flesh and feeding on animal flesh, except custom and practice.

Speaking from personal experience, Cheyne asserted that mental depression afflicted the brilliant rather than the dull, writing that "those of the liveliest and quickest natural Parts ... whose Genius is most keen and penetrating were most prone to such disorders. Fools, weak or stupid Persons, heavy and dull Souls, are seldom troubled with Vapours or Lowness of Spirits."

== Education ==
Cheyne attended the University of Edinburgh and the University of Aberdeen to study medicine. During these years he may have spent a brief time in Leiden. Having finished his studies he went to London in 1701 where he started a practice and became a Fellow of the Royal Society in 1702. Cheyne describes his own life up to 1733 in The English Malady.

== Cheyne's Family Life ==
Cheyne married Margaret Middleton around 1712 or earlier. They had three surviving children, Francis, who was baptized on 23 August 1713 at St Michael's parish in Bath, Peggy (Margaret), and John, possibly born in 1717. John became vicar of Brigstock in Northamptonshire.

== Practice in Bath and London ==
In the summer Cheyne worked in Bath and in the winter at London. However, in 1718 he decided to give up his practice in London to settle in Bath permanently. Roy Porter refers to Cheyne as one of the originators of the neurological school of psychiatry. Though appreciated by many, Cheyne was sometimes the subject of banter as appears from the following poem, which appeared in the 1730s (reprinted in 1757 in the London Magazine). The reference to Cheyne’s weight was based on the fact that Cheyne with 32 stone (almost 203 kg) was seriously overweight. After an illness Cheyne lost almost 10 stone.

Tell me from whom, fat-headed Scot
Thou didst thy system learn
From Hippocrate thou hast it not
Nor Celsus, nor Pitcairne.

Suppose we own that milk is good
And say the same of grass
The one for babes is only food
The other for an ass.

Doctor! One new prescription try
(A friend's advice forgive;)
Eat grass, reduce thyself, and die
Thy patients then may live.

Cheyne’s reply was:

My system, Doctor, is my own
No tutor I pretend
My blunders hurt myself alone
But yours your dearest friend.

Were you to milk and straw confin'd
Thrice happy might you be
Perhaps you might regain your mind
And from your wit get free.

I cannot your prescription try
But heartily "forgive"
'Tis nat'ral you should bid me die
That you yourself may live.

== Cheyne’s Admiration for William Law and Jakob Böhme ==
Cheyne’s admiration for William Law appeared in a letter to Samuel Richardson, his friend and the printer of several of his books. Cheyne was also his physician. The two men corresponded on a very regular basis from 1734 to the year of Cheyne’s death in 1743. In his letter of 9 March 1742 Cheyne enthusiastically asked Richardson whether he had “seen Law's Appeal?" and he described The Appeal as "admirable and unanswerable". Moreover, he wished all the Methodists "might get it by Heart". Cheyne referred here to The Appeal to all that Doubt, or Disbelieve the Truths of the Gospel, whether they be Deists, Arians, Socinians, or Nominal Christians, which had been written by William Law in 1740.

A few weeks later Cheyne wrote in a letter dated 26 April 1742 that Law had already sent him the Regeneration (The Grounds and Reasons of Christian Regeneration, published in 1739) as well as the Appeal. He would, however, very much appreciate it if Richardson could ask the London bookseller William Innys to get all Law's works send to him:

I have had but too much of your Compliments and Gratitude, and instead of your thinking yourself in my Debt for any Thing I can do for you, I have always thought myself in Yours. Remember the Catechism, Mr. Baillie's Character, … but to ease your hyppish, honest, grateful Heart, if you'll get Innys to gather all Mr. Law's Pieces, all he ever wrote or published or is reckoned his, and get them handsomely bound and send them to me, I will keep them in my Family and Library as an eternal Remembrance of you and him, whom I know to be the greatest best Man, and the most solid and deep of this Island. I have most of his larger Pieces already sent by himself, his Appeal and Regeneration lately.

In a footnote to his letter to Richardson of 17 May 1742 Cheyne mentioned that he had received Richardson's "most valuable Present of Mr. Law's Works".

A few months later Samuel Richardson sent one of Jakob Böhme’s works as a gift to Cheyne, as is testified in Cheyne’s letter of 29 August 1742. Cheyne wrote:

I thank you for your Jacob Behemen [sic]; you will never have done with your Bribes. I wish I could do for you what you want and desire. All I can say, without Bribe or Entreaty, of mere Love and good Will, I shall ever do my best for you, and I shall beg of God to direct me in this particularly.

Cheyne may have referred here to any of Boehme's works which had been translated into English during 1645-1662 by John Sparrow, John Ellistone, Humphrey Blunden and Charles Hotham.

== The Importance of Exercise ==
Cheyne was always stressing to his patients the importance of exercise. In winter and bad weather he advised within doors the tremoussoir (or chamber-horse), or walking in a gallery or a suite of rooms, and in good weather any of the exercises mentioned in his earlier works such as walking, riding, fencing, dancing, billiards, tennis, football and digging, of which Cheyne thought walking the most natural, and riding, as it shakes the "whole Machine", the most manly, healthy and least laborious. The valetudinarian might choose the ones suited to the weakness of his organs or limbs. Cheyne also stressed the importance of exercise for women. Even pregnant women should not be confined to their chambers, couches or beds. The only solid and certain way to prevent miscarriages was to pursue all those means and methods likeliest to promote good health, such as air and gentle exercise. All violence or excess was of course to be carefully avoided, but fresh air, gentle exercise and walking was as necessary as food or rest, according to Cheyne. However, exercise ought to be constant and uniform, and never to be performed on a full stomach, nor should they be violent, or long at a time, but orderly at proper hours: "not to Sweating, but to Warmth".

== How to Obtain a Green Old Age ==
To obtain what Cheyne called a "Green Old Age", he advised a wise man who wanted to live on to seventy or eighty to begin at least at the age of fifty to lessen his daily intake of meat and drink, especially in quantity. This was because about this time the "great Crise or Climacteric of Life" generally began in both sexes. For it was then, Cheyne argued, that the blood and the juices of the most healthy and strong began to cool, to thicken and were becoming "vapid" and obstructed in the "Capillaries and Lymphatics". As a result many of these vessels coalesced and became cartilaginous”.

== Aversion of Pain ==
Cheyne had a deep aversion against pain. He concluded The English Malady (1733) by stating that he was one of those "mean-spirited Wretches" who was content to live as long as nature designed him to last and that he would submit with the utmost peace and resignation he could arrive at when his life had to end. But pain, sickness, and especially oppression, anxiety and lowness were his "mortal Aversion" and he added that he would refuse no means to avoid them, except those that would bring him even greater suffering. For he knew there were as many and different degrees of sensibility or of feeling as there were degrees of intelligence and perception in human beings. One perhaps suffered more from the "Prick of a Pin" than others from being "run through their Body", and the first sort seemed to be of the class of the "Quick-Thinkers". None could, however, choose for themselves their own particular frame of mind, nor constitution of body, just as they could not choose their own degree of sensibility, for that was given by the "Author of his Nature", and was already determined. Both were as various as the faces and forms of mankind.

== Vegetarianism ==
In order to succeed in medical practice, Cheyne tried to develop a rapport with his patients by regularly visiting the local taverns where they spent time, a practice common among medical practitioners of the day. He became a popular figure of local social life, and the quantity of rich food and drink he consumed in consequence left him grossly obese and very unhealthy. He began a meatless diet, taking only milk and vegetables, and regained his health. But when he returned to a more typical diet - albeit more moderate than he had previously indulged - he regained weight and his health once again deteriorated. He went back to his vegetarian diet for the remainder of his life, recommending it for everyone suffering from obesity.

Cheyne was an early advocate of lacto-vegetarianism. He promoted his milk and vegetable diet to treat obesity and other health problems. Cheyne wrote about it in An Essay of Health and Long Life, first published in 1724. His diet was criticized by the medical community of his time but was a huge success and his book went through four editions in its first year alone.

== Main works ==
The subjects in Cheyne´s books were of a medical, philosophical and mathematical nature, but certain metaphysical and religious issues of the day, combining Enlightenment objectives with ideas in mystical and radical Pietism, played an important part. His writings, which often went through several editions, were translated into Latin, Dutch, French, Italian and German. His main works are:

- Philosophical Principles of Religion: Natural and Revealed, 1705 (Part I, entitled Philosophical Principles of Natural Religion) and 1715 (Part II) which is mainly concerned with metaphysical matters or the spirit. The first part contained "the Elements of Natural Philosophy and the Proofs for Natural Religion arising from them". Part II contained "the Nature and Kinds of Infinites; their Arithmetick and Uses, and the Philosophick Principles of Revealed Religion".
- Observations concerning the Nature and due Method of treating the Gout, 1720, which deals with physical matters or the body. In this book Cheyne shares his "Observations concerning the Nature and due Method of treating the Gout, … together with an account of the Nature and qualities of the Bath Waters".
- The Essay of Health and Long Life, 1724, which is equally focused on physical matters or the body. In the Preface Cheyne wrote that he had consulted nothing but his “own Experience and Observation on my own crazy Carcase and the Infirmities of others I have treated”. In the first chapter Cheyne wrote that it was easier to preserve health than to recover it, and to prevent diseases than to cure them.
- The English Malady, 1733, which discusses nervous diseases of all kinds. The subtitle of the work was a Treatise of Nervous Diseases of all kinds, Spleen, Vapours, Lowness of Spirits, Hypochondraical, and Hysterical Distempers, etc.
- The Essay on Regimen, 1740, which discusses metaphysical matters, but physical matters as well. It was especially meant for Cheyne's "fellow-sufferers, the gouty, consumptive, or nervous valetudinarian-low-livers".
- The Natural Method of Cureing [sic] the Diseases of the Body, and the Disorders of the Mind depending on the Body, 1742, which is mainly concerned with physical matters, but sometimes also with metaphysical matters. It was his last work and became very popular (five editions).

== Gallery ==
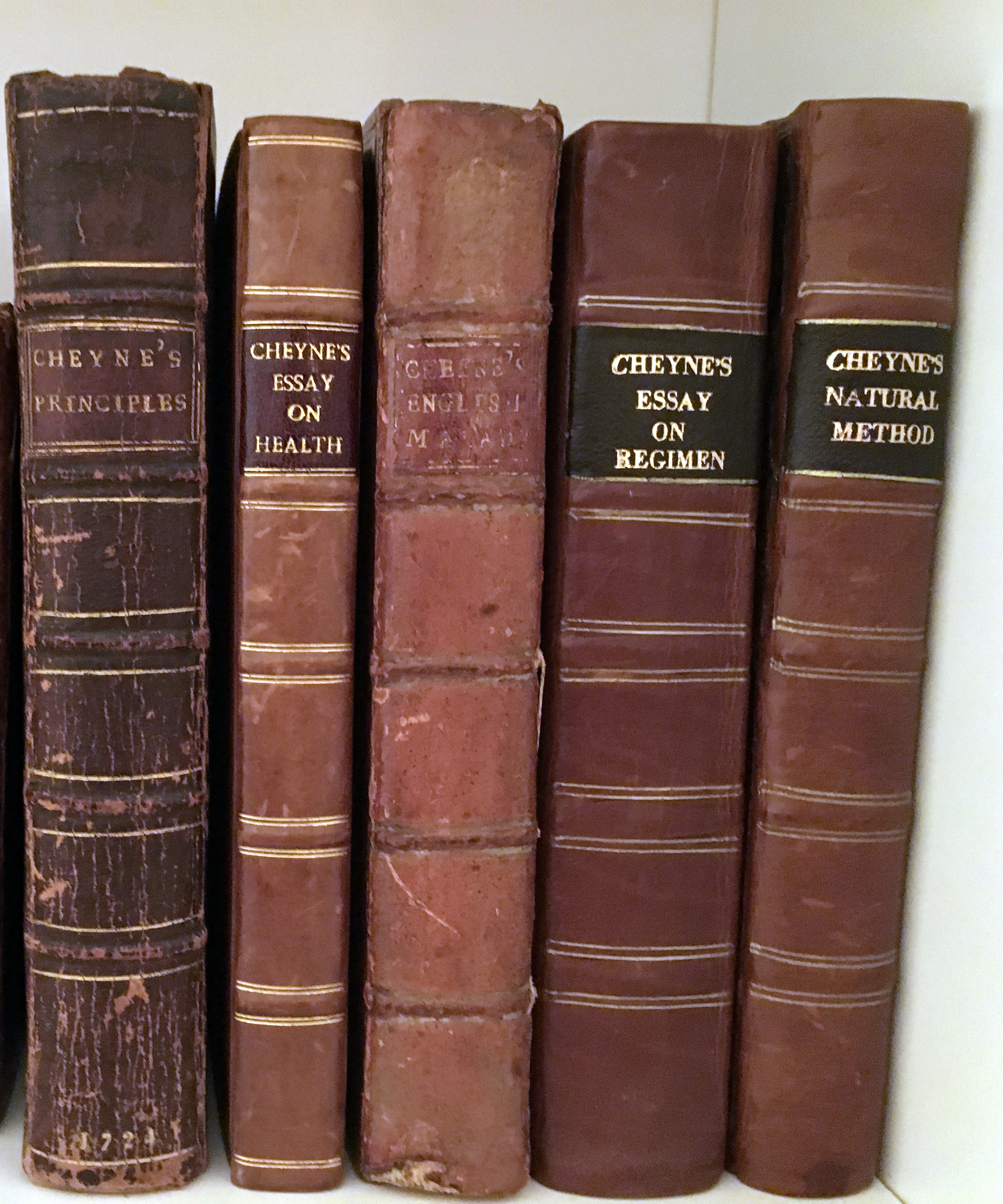
Cheyne's Main Works (except for the Method of Treating the Gout).

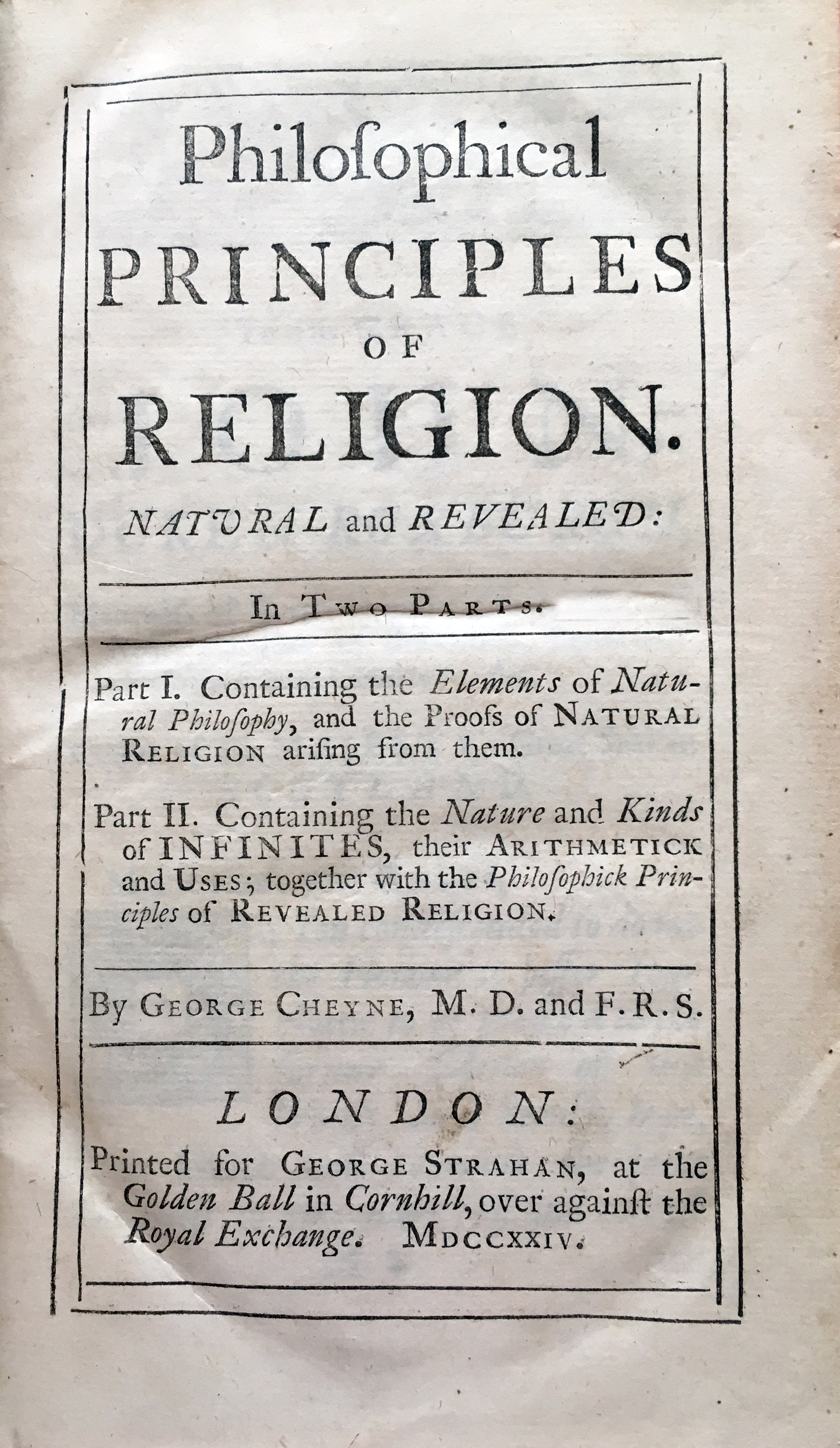
Philosophical Principles, Part I (1705) and II (1715), 1724.

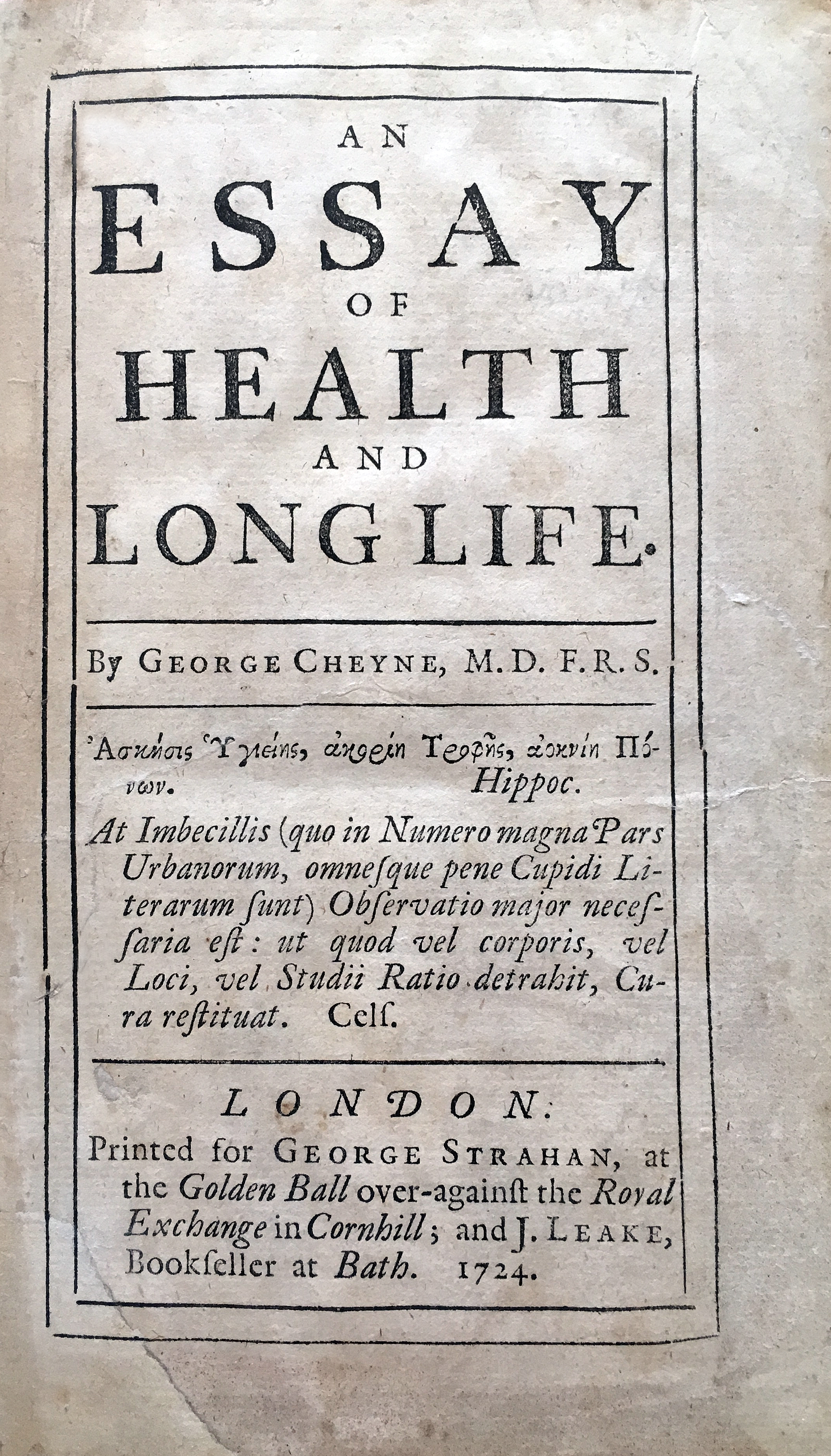
An Essay of Health and Long Life, 1724, George Cheyne.

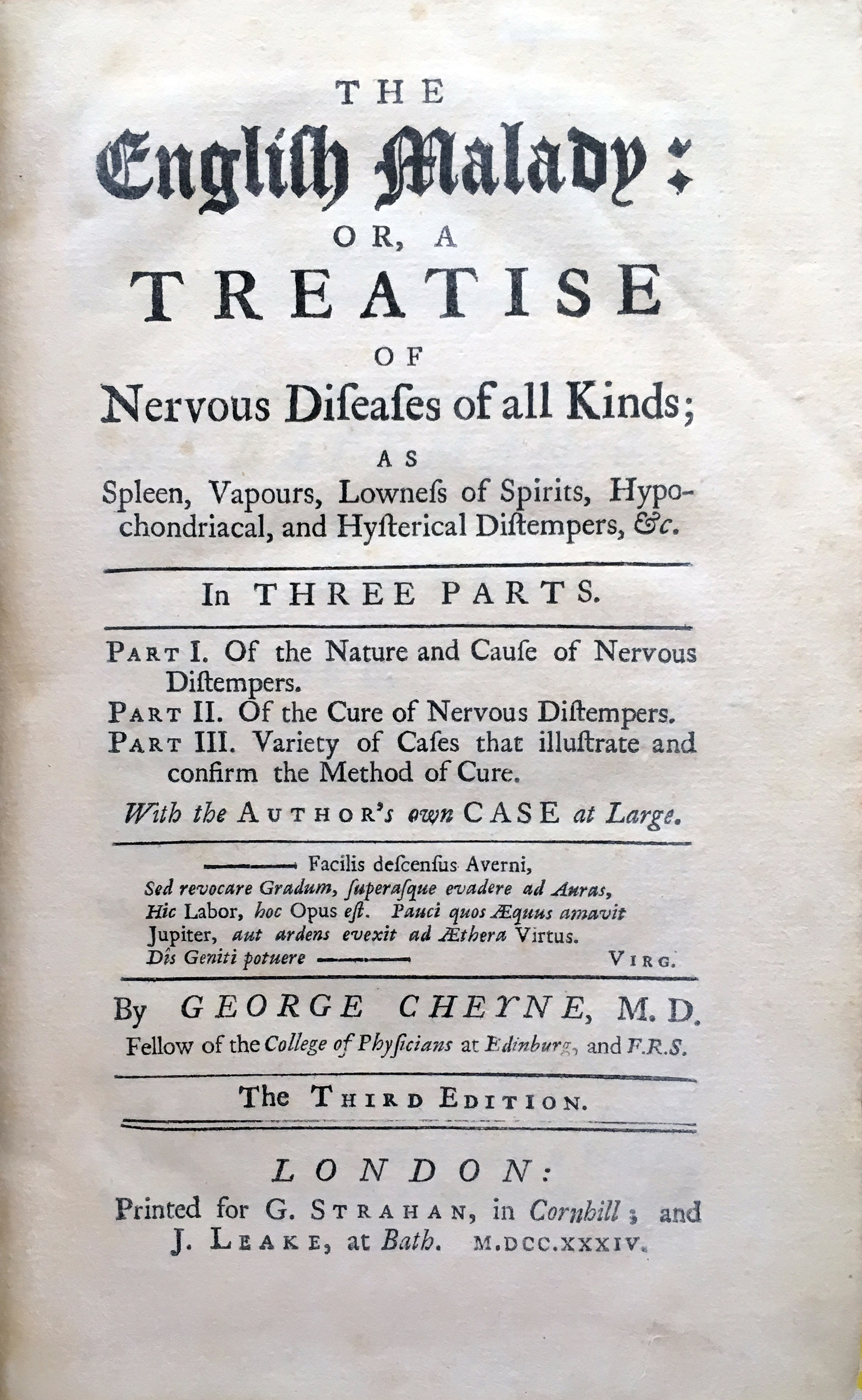
The English Malady, 1733, George Cheyne, third edition of 1734.

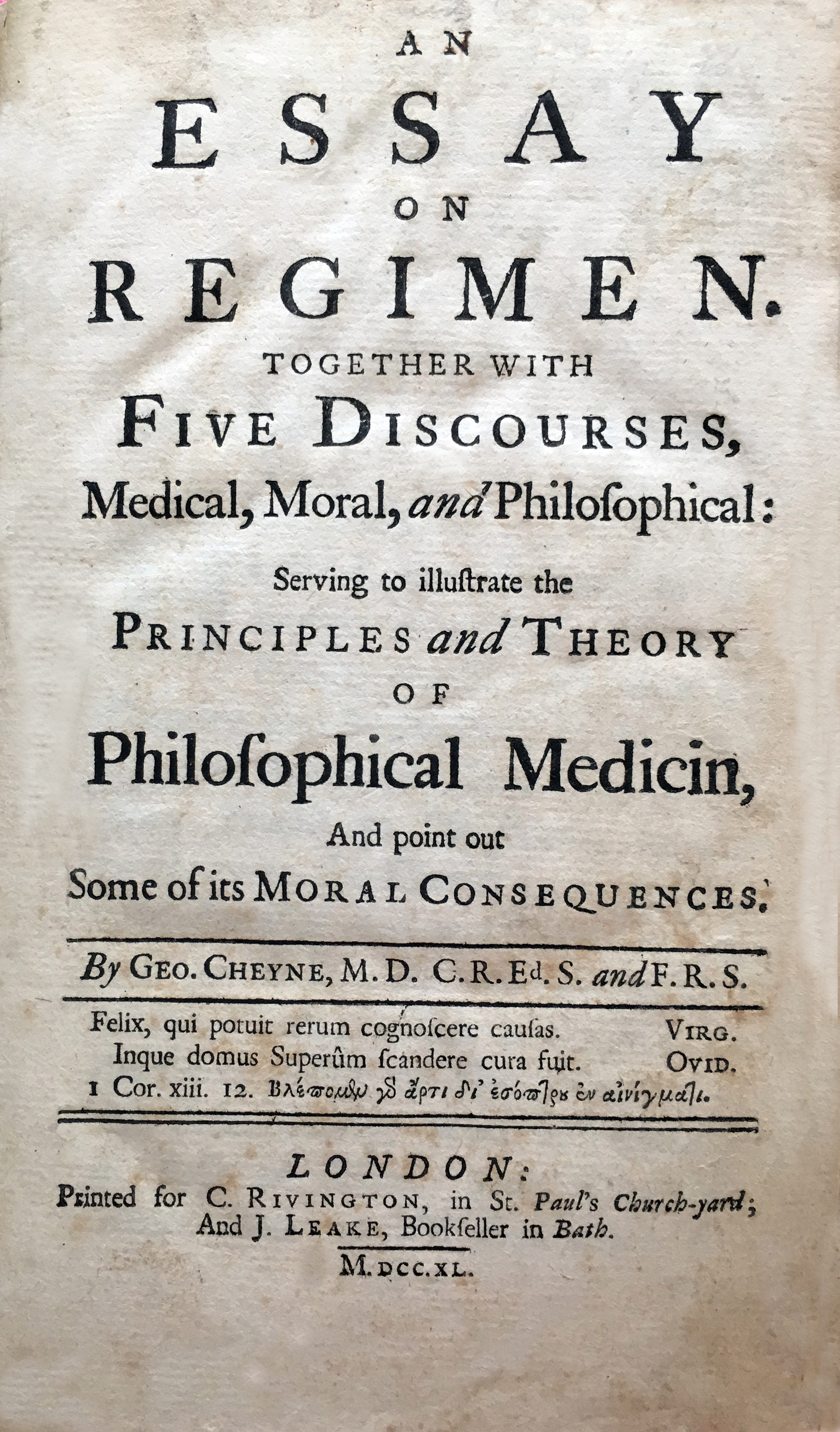
An Essay on Regimen, 1740, George Cheyne.

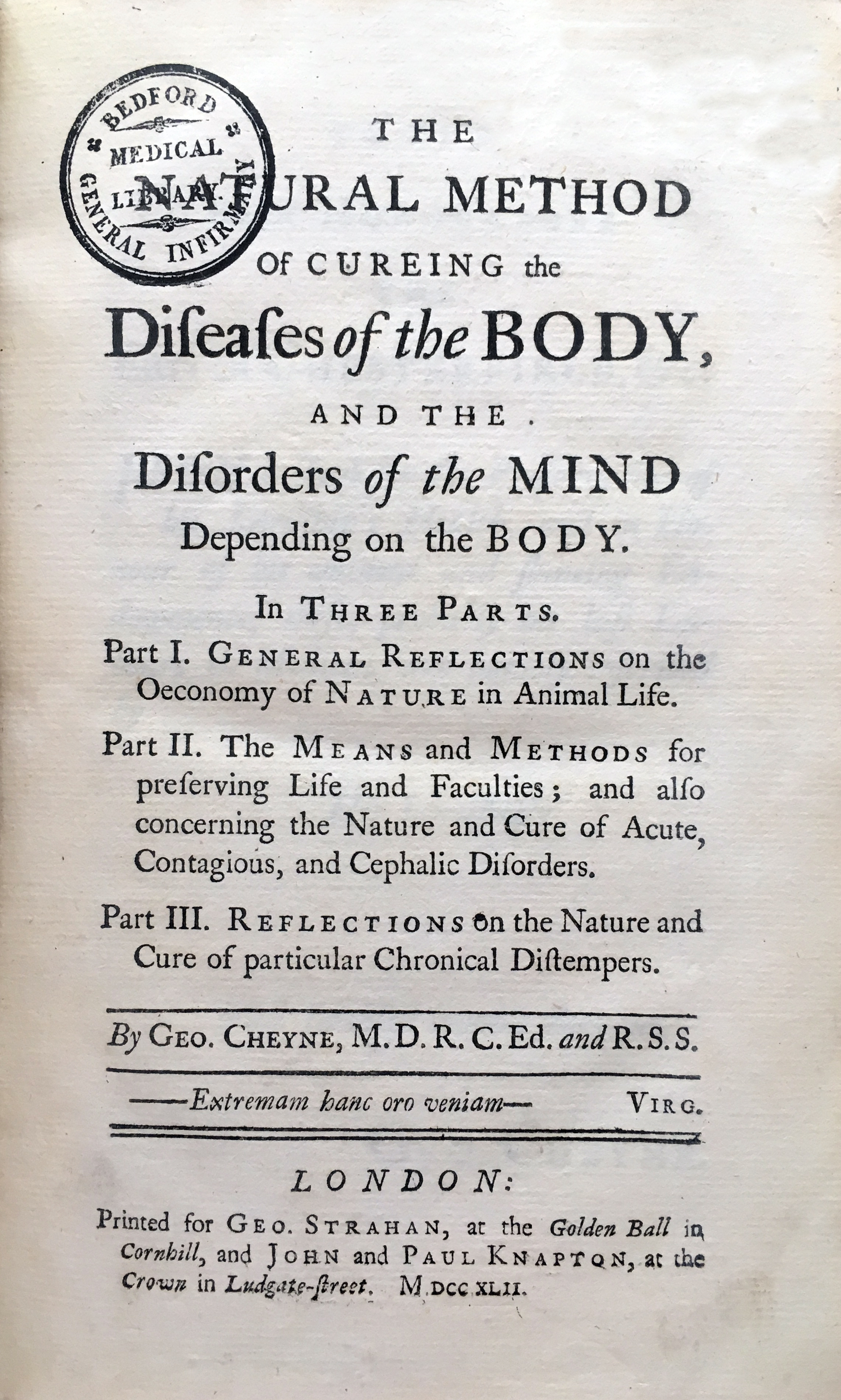
The Natural Method, 1742, George Cheyne.
