= Gianfranco de Turris =

Italian journalist

- Occupation(s): Journalist, writer
- Known for: President of the Fondazione Julius Evola

Gianfranco de Turris is an Italian journalist and the president of the Fondazione Julius Evola. He has been described by political scientist Jean-Yves Camus as "a key figure in Italian right-wing circles".

== Biography ==
A former deputy editor of the RAI Radio Journal for culture, he serves as editorial consultant for Edizioni Mediterranee in Rome; he is also secretary of the Julius Evola Foundation, on whose behalf he edits all reprints of the Traditionalist conservatism philosopher's books.

He was the creator and columnist of the Rai Radio 1 program L'Argonauta, which aired since 2002 for 12 years, with 399 episodes curated by de Turris until July 1, 2012, and then by Paolo Corsini until its closure on April 6, 2014.

In the 1960s he edited the fiction section of the magazine Beyond the Sky. Since the 1970s, he has authored numerous essays and books on fantastic literature, particularly on J. R. R. Tolkien and H. P. Lovecraft, as well as editor of The Other Realm, a journal of science fiction criticism published until the late 1980s; he was also chairman of the J. R. R. Tolkien Prize for all thirteen editions from 1980 to 1992.

His journalistic activity includes collaborations with L'Italiano, Il Conciliatore, Linea, Secolo d'Italia, Il Tempo, L'Italia che scrive, Roma, Dialoghi, Liberal, Il Giornale d'Italia, L'Indipendente, Prospettive nel mondo, La Destra, Il Giornale, Area, L'Italia settimanale and Intervento.

His research has helped shed light on the identity of some of the Pseudonym by which members of the so-called UR Group, an Italian esoteric sodality active in the late 1920s, signed themselves, starting with an article in the 1987 journal Abstracta. On the relationship between Fascism and esoteric circles such as Freemasonry, Theosophy, Anthroposophy, Neopaganism, and the Reconstructionist Roman religion, he also edited a collection of essays by various authors.

In the field of comics, he collaborated for years on Linus magazine edited by Oreste Del Buono and L'Eternauta.

== Writings on Evola ==
De Turris is known for his work on the Italian far-right philosopher Julius Evola, who he portrays as a thinker "committed more to a detached criticism of the contemporary world similar to Nietzsche's critique of nihilism than to political engagement."

He is also the editor-in-chief of Evola's works in Italian with the publisher Edizioni Mediterranee.
