= Massimo Scaligero =

Italian spiritual teacher (1906–1980)

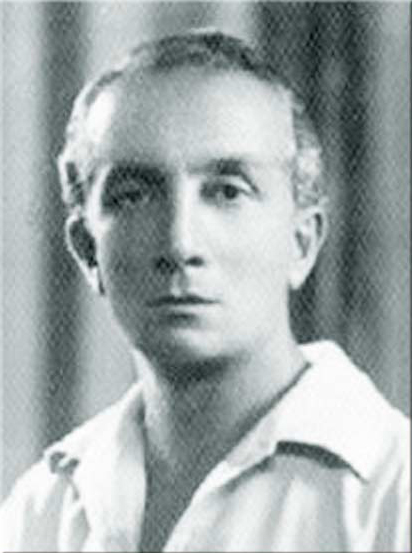
Scaligero in 1949

Massimo Scaligero (born Antonio Sgabelloni; 17 September 1906 – 26 January 1980) was an Italian spiritual teacher and member of the UR Group, which gathered occultists and mystics. A mentee of Julius Evola, Scaligero espoused fierce antisemitic views which were combined with esotericism and anthroposophy into a system of "integral racism" with the aim to bring Germany and Italy closer together in the same way it would the spiritual and the biological. He pleaded for the elimination of Jews.

== Early life and education ==
Massimo Scaligero, born Antonio Sgabelloni on 17 September 1906, in Veroli, Italy, grew up in a culturally rich environment that significantly influenced his spiritual and intellectual development. From an early age, he exhibited a profound interest in literature, philosophy, and spirituality. His formal education encompassed a broad spectrum of humanistic studies, including logic, mathematics, and philosophy.

As a young man, Scaligero experienced intense spiritual phenomena, which led him on a quest to understand the deeper aspects of these experiences. This quest eventually brought him into contact with the works of Rudolf Steiner, the founder of Anthroposophy. Scaligero found that Steiner's descriptions of spiritual science resonated deeply with his own inner experiences. This marked the beginning of his lifelong dedication to anthroposophical studies and practices.

Scaligero's engagement with Steiner's teachings was further solidified through his association with Giovanni Colazza, a direct disciple of Steiner. Under Colazza's mentorship, Scaligero immersed himself in the study of anthroposophy, developing a profound understanding of Steiner's spiritual science. This foundation enabled him to contribute significantly to the dissemination and development of anthroposophical ideas in Italy.

== Association with Julius Evola ==
Scaligero's philosophical and spiritual development was significantly influenced by his association with Julius Evola, a leading esoteric thinker of the 20th century. Evola, known for his traditionalist and esoteric writings, played a crucial role in the formation and direction of the UR Group, an esoteric organization that Scaligero joined. This group was dedicated to exploring and integrating various mystical and occult traditions, and Evola's ideas provided a foundational framework for its members.

Scaligero adopted and further developed many of Evola's esoteric teachings, particularly those related to spiritual transformation and initiation. Evola's work, deeply rooted in Hermeticism, traditionalism, and Eastern philosophy, provided many of the ideas that Scaligero wove into his own explorations and writings. This influence is evident in Scaligero's emphasis on the transformative power of inner spiritual practices and the pursuit of higher knowledge.

Additionally, Scaligero shared some of Evola's controversial views, including antisemitism and the concept of "integral racism". This ideology sought to merge spiritual and biological elements to achieve a form of racial purity, aligning with the broader racial theories prevalent during the fascist period. Both Evola and Scaligero viewed this integration as a means to rejuvenate European civilization by returning to traditional values and spiritual principles. This aspect of their philosophy was part of their broader critique of modernity and their desire to revive what they saw as the spiritual and cultural grandeur of ancient traditions.

Within the UR Group, Scaligero worked closely with Evola and other esotericists. The group's activities included the publication of UR and KRUR, journals that disseminated their esoteric teachings and explored the intersection of mysticism, politics, and spirituality. Scaligero's contributions to these journals highlight his deep engagement with the group's objectives and his alignment with Evola's vision. These publications were instrumental in spreading their ideas and attracting a following among those interested in esoteric and occult practices.

Evola's death in 1974 marked the end of a significant chapter in Scaligero's life. Evola's passing led to changes in how Scaligero and the remaining members of the UR Group continued their esoteric pursuits and teachings.

== Esoteric and spiritual work ==
Following Julius Evola's death in 1974, Scaligero continued to develop and expand upon his esoteric and spiritual teachings. Scaligero's post-Evola work emphasized the transformative power of thought and inner spiritual practices, deeply rooted in anthroposophy and the broader esoteric traditions he had explored throughout his life.

Scaligero wrote extensively, producing over 30 books that delved into various aspects of esoteric philosophy, spiritual science, and the practice of inner transformation. His writings focused on the concept of "Living Thought", which he described as the process of transforming human thinking into a direct and authentic instrument for spiritual experience. This idea was central to his book A Treatise on Living Thought, where he outlined a system of exercises aimed at developing what he called "sense-free thinking". This method was intended to enable practitioners to experience thought as a living, spiritual substance rather than a mere intellectual abstraction.

In addition to his written works, Scaligero was a dedicated teacher and lecturer. He conducted numerous lectures and personal meetings, where he guided students in their spiritual practices and provided insights into his esoteric teachings. His emphasis on personal experience and inner development was a hallmark of his approach, reflecting his belief that true spiritual knowledge could only be attained through direct, inner experience.

Scaligero also maintained a strong connection to anthroposophy, continuing the work of his mentor, Rudolf Steiner. He integrated Steiner's spiritual science into his teachings, focusing on the application of anthroposophical principles to personal spiritual development. This integration is evident in his book From Yoga to the Rose Cross, where he explores the connections between Eastern spiritual practices and Western esoteric traditions, demonstrating how these diverse influences can be harmonized within a comprehensive spiritual framework.

Massimo Scaligero died on 26 January 1980. His writings remain a subject of study and practice for those interested in anthroposophy and the integration of Eastern and Western esoteric traditions.

== Legacy ==
Scaligero's contributions to esoteric thought and practice extended beyond his immediate circle of students. His works have been translated into multiple languages, reaching a broader audience and influencing contemporary esoteric and spiritual movements. His legacy continues to be recognized in the field of esotericism, with scholars and practitioners alike acknowledging his role in the development of modern esoteric spirituality.

== Works ==
- La Razza di Roma, (Mantero, Tivoli, 1939)
- Niccoloso da Recco, navigatore atlantico (Milano, Editore Zucchi; ristampa:Roma, Tilopa, 2003)
- Iniziazione e Tradizione (Roma, Tilopa, 1956)
- Avvento dell'uomo interiore. Lineamenti di una tecnica dell'esperienza sovrasensibile (Firenze, Sansoni, 1959)
- Trattato del pensiero vivente. Una Via oltre le filosofie occidentali, oltre lo Yoga, oltre lo Zen (Milano, Feriani, 1961)
- La Via della volontà solare. Fenomenologia dell'Uomo Interiore (Roma, Tilopa, 1962)
- Dell'amore immortale (Roma, Tilopa, 1963)
- Segreti dello spazio e del tempo (Roma, Tilopa, 1963)
- La Luce. Introduzione all'Immaginazione Creatrice (Roma, Tilopa, 1964)
- Il marxismo accusa il mondo (Roma, Tilopa, 1964)
- Magia sacra. Una via per la reintegrazione dell'Uomo (Roma, Tilopa, 1966)
- La logica contro l'uomo. Il mito della scienza e la Via del Pensiero (Roma, Tilopa, 1967)
- Hegel, Marcuse, Mao. Marxismo o Rivoluzione? (Roma, Volpe, 1968)
- Graal. Saggio sul Mistero del Sacro Amore (Roma, Perseo, 1969)
- Rivoluzione. Discorso ai giovani (Roma, Perseo, 1969)
- Lotta di classe e karma (Roma, Perseo, 1970)
- Yoga, meditazione, magia (Roma, Teseo, 1971)
- La tradizione solare (Roma, Teseo, 1971)
- Dallo Yoga alla Rosacroce (Roma, Perseo, 1972)
- Manuale pratico della meditazione (Roma, Teseo, 1973)
- Il Logos e i nuovi misteri (Roma, Teseo, 1973)
- Psicoterapia. Fondamenti Esoterici (Roma, Perseo, 1974)
- Tecniche di concentrazione interiore (Roma, Edizioni Mediterranee, 1975)
- Guarire con il pensiero (Roma, Edizioni Mediterranee, 1975)
- Reincarnazione e karma (Roma, Edizioni Mediterranee, 1976)
- L'uomo interiore. Lineamenti dell'Esperienza Sovrasensibile (Roma, Edizioni Mediterranee, 1976)
- Meditazione e miracolo (Roma, Edizioni Mediterranee, 1977)
- Il pensiero come antimateria (Roma, Perseo, 1978)
- Kundalini d'occidente. Il centro umano della potenza (Roma, Edizioni Mediterranee, 1980)
- Iside Sophia. La Dea ignota (Roma, Edizioni Mediterranee, 1980)
- Zen e Logos (Roma, Tilopa, 1980)
- Il sorriso degli Dei (Roma, Tilopa, 1986)
- La pietra e la folgore (Roma, Tilopa, 1988)

=== English translations ===
- The Light (La Luce): An introduction to creative imagination. Great Barrington, MA: Lindesfarne Books, 2001. ISBN 978-0-9701097-6-7.
- The Secrets of Space and Time. Great Barrington, MA: Lindesfarne Books, 2013. ISBN 978-1-58420-130-4.
- A Practical Manual of Meditation. Great Barrington, MA: Lindesfarne Books, 2015. ISBN 978-1-58420-190-8.
- A Treatise on Living Thinking: A Path beyond Western Philosophy, beyond Yoga, beyond Zen. Great Barrington, MA: Lindesfarne Books, 2015. ISBN 978-1-58420-179-3.
- The Logic Against Humanity: The Myth of Science and the Path of Thinking. Great Barrington, MA: Lindesfarne Books, 2017. ISBN 978-1-58420-944-7.

== See also ==
- The Philosophy of Freedom – Philosophical treatise by Rudolf Steiner
