= John Henry Overton =

English cleric

- Born: 4 January 1835
- Died: 17 September 1903 (aged 68)

John Henry Overton, VD, DD (hon) (4 January 1835–17 September 1903) was an English cleric, known as a church historian.

== Life ==
Born at Louth, Lincolnshire, on 4 January 1835, he was the only son of Francis Overton, a surgeon of Louth, by his wife Helen Martha, daughter of Major John Booth, of Louth. Educated first (1842–5) at Louth grammar school, and then at a private school at Laleham, Middlesex under the Rev. John Buckland, Overton went to Rugby School in February 1849. He obtained an open scholarship at Lincoln College, Oxford. A sportsman, he was placed in the first class in classical moderations in 1855 and in the third class in the final classical school in 1857. He graduated B.A. in 1858, and proceeded M.A. in 1860.

In 1858 Overton was ordained to the curacy of Quedgeley, Gloucestershire, and in 1860 was presented by J. L. Fytche, a friend of his father, to the vicarage of Legbourne, Lincolnshire. He took pupils, and studied English church history. Overton was collated to a prebend in Lincoln Cathedral by Bishop Christopher Wordsworth in 1879, and in 1883, on William Gladstone's recommendation, was presented by the crown to the rectory of Epworth, Lincolnshire. While at Epworth he was rural dean of Axholme.

In 1889 Overton was made hon. D.D. of Edinburgh University. From 1892 to 1898 he was proctor for the clergy in Convocation. In 1898 he was presented by the dean and chapter of Lincoln to the rectory of Gumley, near Market Harborough, and represented the chapter in convocation. He was a frequent speaker at church congresses. In 1901 he was a select preacher at Oxford, and from 1902 Birkbeck lecturer in Ecclesiastical History at Trinity College, Cambridge. Early in 1903 Carr Glyn, the bishop of Peterborough, made him a residentiary canon of his cathedral; he was installed on 12 February.

Overton was for more than 20 years an Honorary Chaplain to the 1st Lincolnshire (Western Division) Artillery, for which he received the Volunteer Officers' Decoration (VD) 3 April 1894.

== Death and legacy ==
Overton kept one period of residence at Peterborough, but did not live to inhabit his prebendal house. He died at Gumley rectory on 17 September 1903. He was buried in the churchyard of the parish church of Skidbrook near Louth. He was a high churchman and a member of the English Church Union.

As memorials of Overton a brass tablet was placed in Epworth parish church by the parishioners, a stained glass window and a reredos in Skidbrook church, and a two-light window in the chapter-house of Lincoln Cathedral. A stained-glass window [13 Nave - North Wall (ix)] in St James' Church, Louth, Lincolnshire has the dedication 'To the glory of God and in memory of John Henry Overton M.A. D.D., Pastor, Scholar and Historian born at Louth 4th Janry 1835, died at Gumley 17 September 1903'.

== Works ==
In 1878, with his college friend Charles John Abbey, rector of Checkendon, Oxfordshire, he published The English Church in the Eighteenth Century, 2 vols. A second and abridged edition in one volume was published in 1887. He also published:

- William Law, Nonjuror and Mystic, 1881.
- Life in the English Church, 1660–1714, 1885.
- The Evangelical Revival in the Eighteenth Century in Mandell Creighton's Epochs of Church History, 1886.
- Life of Christopher Wordsworth, Bishop of Lincoln, with Elizabeth Wordsworth, 1888, 1890.
- John Hannah, a Clerical Study, 1890.
- John Wesley, in the "Leaders of Religion" series, 1891.
- The English Church in the Nineteenth Century, 1894.
- The Church in England, 2 vols., in Peter Hempson Ditchfield's "National Churches", 1897.
- The Anglican Revival in the "Victorian Era" series, 1897.
- An edition of William Law's Serious Call in the English Theological Library, 1898.
- The Nonjurors, their Lives, &c., 1902.
- Some Post-Reformation Saints, 1905, posthumous.

At his death Overton left unfinished A History of the English Church from the Accession of George I to the End of the Eighteenth Century,’ a volume for the "History of the English Church" edited by Dean Stephens and William Hunt; the book was edited and completed by the Rev. Frederic Relton in 1906. He contributed memoirs of divines to the Dictionary of National Biography, and wrote for the Dictionary of Hymnology, the Church Quarterly Review, and other periodicals.

== Family ==
On 17 July 1862 Overton married Marianne Ludlam, daughter of John Allott of Hague Hall, Yorkshire, and rector of Maltby, Lincolnshire; she survived him with one daughter.
