= Amedeo Rocco Armentano =

Amedeo Rocco Armentano (6 February 1886, Scalea – 14 September 1966, São Paulo) was an Italian esotericist and musician. Armentano was, together with Arturo Reghini, one of the main creators of the pagan revival in Italy.

== Biography ==
Born in Scalea (Cosenza) on 10 February 1886 to Giuseppe Armentano and Maria Alario, at the age of fifteen he moved with his family to Brazil, where relatives had been living for some time. There he began to study music (piano and violin) and attended the Liberi Pensatori (english: free thinkers) club in São Paulo.

In 1905 he returned to Italy and settled in Florence to attend the Reale Istituto Musicale. In 1907, after having been initiated into Freemasonry, Armentano met Arturo Reghini and began to work with him on a reform of the Italian Freemasonry, in order to give it a more properly Italian-Pythagorean rather than a Jewish-Christian connotation. In that year, he was initiated into the "Lucifero" Lodge of the Rito Simbolico Italiano (Grand Orient of Italy), of which Reghini had been one of the founders.

Around 1909, Armentano rented the Torre Talao, overlooking the sea near Scalea and which he bought a few years later, to make it the meeting place of a Pythagorean school (the Schola italica) that would take up the ancient one.

In the same years the Rito Filosofico Italiano (english: Italian Philosophical Rite) was established, of which Armentano himself, with the nickname "Ermete Cosentino" and together with Arturo Reghini and Edoardo Frosini, became exponents. The new rite wanted to link up with the Scottish Philosophical Rite (italian: Rito Filosofico Scozzese), considered the heir and continuer of the British Pythagorean tradition. Armentano and Reghini, in rewriting the statutes of the Philosophical Rite, established that, in a masonic temple, a copy of the Golden Verses of Pythagoras should be kept instead of the Bible, as was and is normally the case in Masonic lodges.

At the outbreak of the Great War, he left as a volunteer for the Cadore front. He joined the Alpini corps, but was later transferred to Belluno due to an onset of heart disease and finally to a unit in Naples, far from the war scene. Arturo Reghini and other disciples, such as Giulio Guerrieri, also volunteered, motivated by a spirit of patriotism; a spirit that had previously manifested itself in activities, including public ones, of an interventionist nature (such as Reghini's participation in the Radiosomaggismo in Rome).

In 1919, the Philosophical Rite was "suspended" and in the early months of the year, Armentano concluded negotiations for a co-option of his and Reghini's group in the Ancient and Accepted Scottish Rite of which Saverio Fera was the Sovereign Grand Commander. He joined his Supreme Council of Italy (Piazza del Gesù) with the 33rd degree.

On 18 December 1923, together with Reghini and others, he formed the Sodalizio Pitagorico, which took up the spirit of the Schola Italica of ten years earlier.

Armentano embarked in Naples for Brazil with his whole family on 3 May 1924 and never returned home. He maintained correspondence with his disciples and collaborators, including Giulio Parise and Manlio Magnani.

== Personality and alleged powers ==
It is widely believed in pagan, esoteric and Masonic circles that Armentano had a charismatic personality, even possessing psychic powers, and it is said that after his departure for Brazil, his disciples continued to have a deep veneration for their Master. In the same circles, it is still believed that Armentano was the last exponent of a pagan Pythagorean chain of initiation from antiquity to the present day.

== Bibliography ==
- Massime di scienza iniziatica, edited by Roberto Sestito, Editrice Associazione Culturale Agnis, Ancona, 1992.
