= William Law =

Church of England priest (1686–1761)

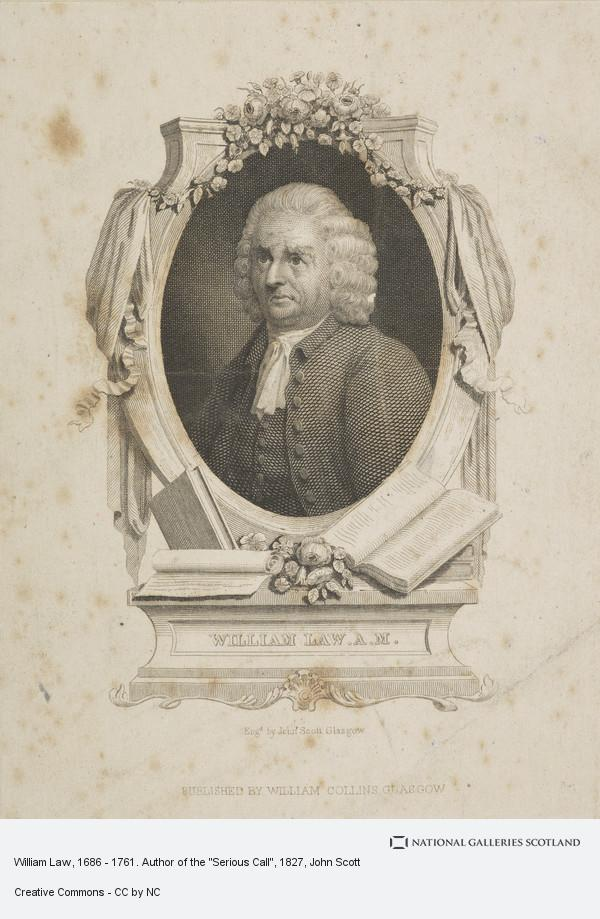
- Line engraving c. 1827
- Born: 1686; King's Cliffe, Northamptonshire, England
- Died: 9 April 1761 (aged 74–75); King's Cliffe, Northamptonshire, England
- Venerated in: Anglican Communion
- Feast: 10 April

William Law (1686 – 9 April 1761) was a Church of England priest, spiritual writer, and theologian whose influence extended far beyond the circumstances that curtailed his ministry. He lost his position at Emmanuel College, Cambridge, when his conscience would not allow him to take the required oath of allegiance to the first Hanoverian monarch, King George I. Having previously sworn allegiance to the House of Stuart, Law is sometimes considered a second-generation non-juror.

Following his removal, Law continued as a simple priest (curate), but when that too became impossible without the required oath, he supported himself through private teaching while pursuing an extensive literary and devotional career. His personal integrity, together with his mystical and theological writings, made him one of the most influential religious voices of his age, shaping both the evangelistic movement and the thought of Enlightenment figures such as the writer Samuel Johnson and the historian Edward Gibbon.

Law's writings continued to inspire readers long after his death. In 1784, William Wilberforce (1759–1833), the politician, philanthropist, and leader of the movement to stop the slave trade, was deeply touched by reading William Law's book A Serious Call to a Devout and Holy Life (1729). Law's spiritual writings remain in print today.

== Bangorian controversy and after ==
The first of Law's controversial works was Three Letters to the Bishop of Bangor (1717), a contribution to the Bangorian controversy on the high-church side. It was followed by Remarks on Mandeville's Fable of the Bees (1723), in which he vindicated morality; it was praised by John Sterling, and republished by F. D. Maurice. Law's Case of Reason (1732), in answer to Tindal's Christianity as old as the Creation, is to some extent an anticipation of Joseph Butler's argument in the Analogy of Religion. His Letters to a Lady inclined to enter the Church of Rome are specimens of the attitude of a High Church Anglican towards Roman Catholicism.

== Writings on practical divinity ==
A Serious Call to a Devout and Holy Life (1729), together with its predecessor, A Practical Treatise Upon Christian Perfection (1726), influenced the chief actors in the great evangelistic revival. John and Charles Wesley, George Whitefield, Henry Venn, Thomas Scott and Thomas Adam all expressed their obligation to the author. The Serious Call is still the work for which its author is best known, and Samuel Johnson, Gibbon, Lord Lyttelton and Bishop Home have made statements about its merits.

In a tract entitled The Absolute Unlawfulness of the Stage Entertainment (1726), Law was agitated by the corruptions of the stage to preach against all plays, and incurred some criticism the same year from John Dennis in The Stage Defended.

His writing is anthologised by various denominations, including in the Classics of Western Spirituality series by the Catholic Paulist Press.

The devotional writer Andrew Murray was so impressed by Law's writings that he republished a number of his works, stating "I do not know where to find anywhere else the same clear and powerful statement of the truth which the Church needs at the present day."

== Mysticism ==
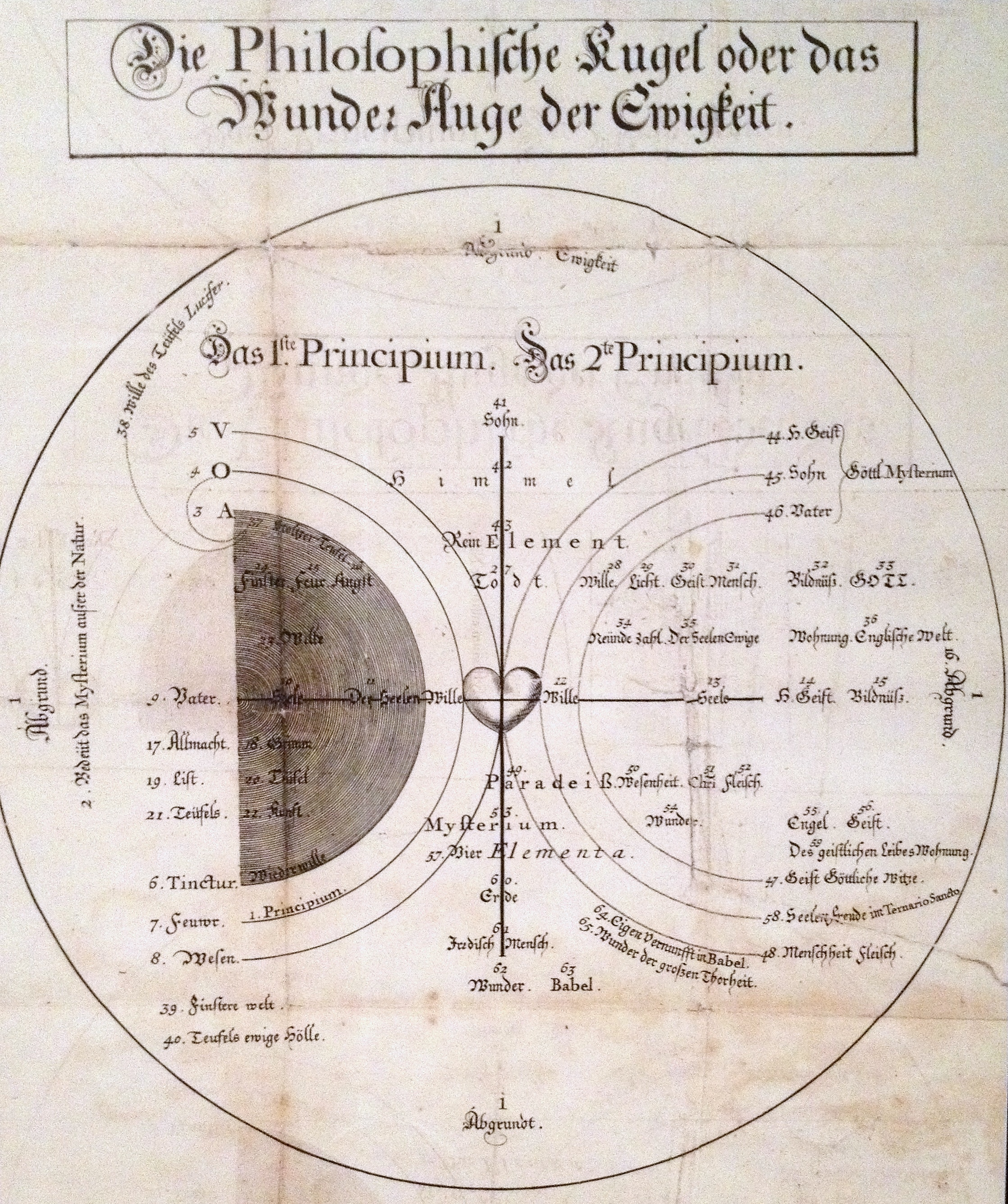
Böhme's cosmogony: The Philosophical Sphere or the Wonder Eye of Eternity (1620).

In his later years, Law became an admirer of the German Christian mystic Jakob Böhme. The journal of John Byrom mentions that, probably around 1735 or 1736, the physician and Behmenist George Cheyne had drawn Law's attention to the book Fides et Ratio, written in 1708 by the French Protestant theologian Pierre Poiret. It was in this book that Law came across the name of the mystic Jakob Böhme. From then on, Law's writings, such as A Demonstration of the Errors of a late Book (1737) and The Grounds and Reasons of Christian Regeneration (1739), contained a mystical note. In 1740 appeared An Earnest and Serious Answer to Dr. Trapp and in 1742 An Appeal to All that Doubt. An Appeal was greatly admired by Law's friend George Cheyne, who wrote on 9 March 1742 to his good friend, the printer and novelist Samuel Richardson: "Have you seen Law's Appeal ... it is admirable and unanswerable". John Byrom wrote a poem based on An Earnest and Serious Answer, which was found among the manuscripts of Samuel Richardson after his death in 1761.

Law's mystical tendencies caused the first breach in 1738 between Law and the practical-minded John Wesley after an exchange of four letters in which each explained his own position. After eighteen years of silence, Wesley attacked Law and his Behmenist philosophy once again in an open letter in 1756 in which Wesley wrote:

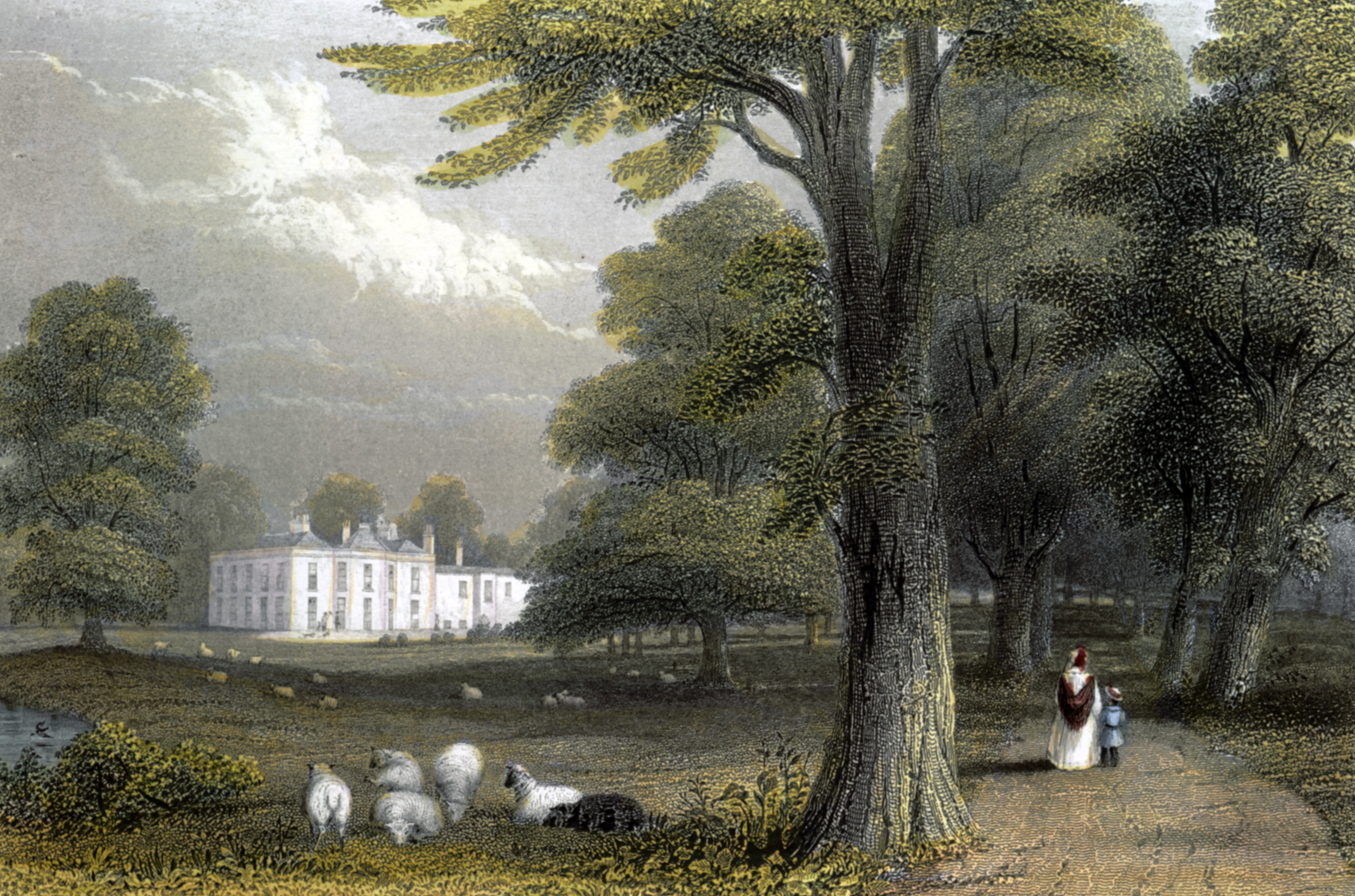
Lime Grove Putney (1846), home of the Gibbon family where William Law walked with John Byrom and other friends.

I have scarce met with a greater friend to darkness except 'the illuminated Jacob Behmen'. But, Sir, have you not done him an irreparable injury? I do not mean by misrepresenting his sentiments; (though some of his profound admirers are positive that you misunderstand and murder him throughout) but by dragging him out of his awful obscurity; by pouring light upon his venerable darkness. Men may admire the deepness of the well, and the excellence of the water it contains: But if some officious person puts a light into it, it will appear to be both very shallow and very dirty. I could not have borne to spend so many words on so egregious trifles, but that they are mischievous trifles: ... bad philosophy has, by insensible degrees, paved the way for bad divinity.

Law never responded to this open letter, though he had been deeply upset, as testified by John Byrom.

After seven years of silence, Law further explored Böhme's ideas in The Spirit of Prayer (1749–1750), followed by The Way to Divine Knowledge (1752) and The Spirit of Love (1752–1754). He worked on a new translation of Böhme's works, for which The Way to Divine Knowledge had been the preparation. Samuel Richardson had been involved in the printing of some of Law's works, e.g. A Practical Treatise upon Christian Perfection (second edition of 1728), and The Way to Divine Knowledge (1752), since Law's publishers William and John Innys worked closely with Samuel Richardson.

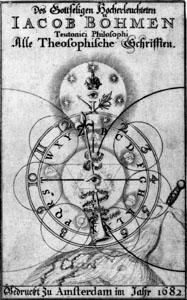
Title page of the Johann Georg Gichtel (1638–1710) edition of 1682, printed in Amsterdam.

Law had taught himself the "High Dutch Language" to be able to read the original text of the "blessed Jacob". He owned a quarto edition of 1715, which had been carefully printed from the Johann Georg Gichtel edition of 1682, printed in Amsterdam where Gichtel (1638–1710) lived and worked.

After the death of both Law and Richardson in 1761, Law's friends George Ward and Thomas Langcake published a four-volume version of the works of Jakob Böhme between 1764 and 1781. It was paid for by Elizabeth Hutcheson. This version became known as the "Law-edition of Böhme", even though Law had never found the time to contribute to this new edition. As a result of this, it was ultimately based on the original translations made by John Ellistone and John Sparrow between 1645 and 1662, with only a few changes. This edition was greatly admired by Samuel Taylor Coleridge and William Blake. Law had found some illustrations made by the German early Böhme exegetist Dionysius Andreas Freher (1649–1728), which had been included in this edition. Upon seeing these symbolic drawings, Blake said during a dinner party in 1825 "Michel Angelo could not have surpassed them".

Law served as Edward Gibbon's father's tutor, and his aunt's spiritual advisor. Law died at Gibbon's aunt's home. In his Autobiography, Edward Gibbon evaluates Law in these terms:

In our family he had the reputation of a worthy and pious man, who believed all that he professed, and practised all that he enjoyed. [...] His theological writings, which our domestic connexion has tempted me to peruse, preserve an imperfect sort of life, and I can pronounce with more confidence and knowledge on the merits of the author. His last compositions are darkly tinctured by the incomprehensible visions of Jacob Behmen; and his discourse on the absolute unlawfulness of stage entertainments is sometimes quoted for a ridiculous intemperance of sentiment and language. [...] But these sallies of religious frenzy must not extinguish the praise which is due to Mr. William Law as a wit and a scholar. His argument on topics of less absurdity is specious and acute, his manner is lively, his style is forcible and clear; and had not his vigorous mind been clouded by enthusiasm, he might be ranked with the most agreeable and ingenious writers of the times.

— Edward Gibbon, Autobiography, 15-16

=== Law's admiration for Isaac Newton and Jakob Böhme ===
Law greatly admired both Isaac Newton, whom he called "this great philosopher", and Jakob Böhme, "the illuminated instrument of God". In part I of The Spirit of Love (1752) Law wrote that in the three properties of desire one can see the "Ground and Reason" of the three great "laws of matter and motion lately discovered [by Sir Isaac Newton]". Law added that he "need[ed] no more to be told that the illustrious Sir Isaac [had] ploughed with Behmen's heifer", which had led to the discovery of these laws.

Law added that in the mathematical system of Newton these three properties of desire, i.e. "attraction, equal resistance, and the orbicular motion of the planets as the effect of them", are treated as facts and appearances, whose ground appears not to be known. However, Law wrote, it is in "our Behmen, the illuminated Instrument of God" that:

Their Birth and Power in Eternity are opened; their eternal Beginning is shown, and how and why all Worlds, and every Life of every Creature, whether it be heavenly, earthly, or hellish, must be in them, and from them, and can have no Nature, either spiritual or material, no kind of Happiness or Misery, but according to the working Power and State of these Properties. All outward Nature, all inward Life, is what it is, and works as it works, from this unceasing powerful Attraction, Resistance, and Whirling.

Aldous Huxley quotes admiringly and at length from Law's writings on mysticism in his anthology The Perennial Philosophy, pointing out remarkable parallels between his (Law's) mystical insights and those of Mahayana Buddhism, Vedanta, Sufism, Taoism and other traditions encompassed by Leibniz's concept of the Philosophia Perennis. Huxley wrote:

Granted that the ground of the individual soul is akin to...the divine Ground of all existence...what is the ultimate nature of good and evil, and what the true purpose and end of life? The answers to these questions will be given to a great extent in the words of that most surprising product of the English eighteenth century, William Law...a man who was not only a master of English prose, but also one of the most interesting thinkers of his period and one of the most endearingly saintly figures in the whole history of Anglicanism.

== Veneration ==
Law is honoured on 10 April on the calendars of the Church of England and the Episcopal Church.

== List of works ==
- Remarks upon a Late Book, Entituled, The Fable of the Bees (1724)
- "A Practical Treatise Upon Christian Perfection" (1726)
- A Serious Call to a Devout and Holy Life (1729)
- A Demonstration of the Gross and Fundamental Errors of a late Book called a Plain Account, etc., of the Lord's Supper (1737)
- The Grounds and Reasons of the Christian Regeneration (1739)
- An Earnest and Serious Answer to Dr Trapp's Sermon on being Righteous Overmuch (1740)
- An Appeal to All that Doubt (1742)
- The Spirit of Prayer (1749, 1750)
- The Way to Divine Knowledge (1752)
- The Spirit of Love (1752-1754)
- A Short but Sufficient Confutation of Dr Warburton's Projected Defence (as he calls it) of Christianity in his Divine Legation of Moses (1757). Reply to The Divine Legation of Moses.
- A Collection of Letters on the Most Interesting and Important Subjects, and on Several Occasions (1760)
- Of Justification by Faith and Works, A Dialogue between a Methodist and a Churchman (1760)
- "An Humble, Earnest and Affectionate Address to the Clergy" (1761), renamed "The Power of the Spirit" by Andrew Murray in his 1896 reprint.
- You Will Receive Power
- The Way to Christ by Jakob Böhme, translated by William Law
- The Supersensual Life by Jakob Böhme, translated by William Law (1901)
