= John Sparrow (translator) =

English translator

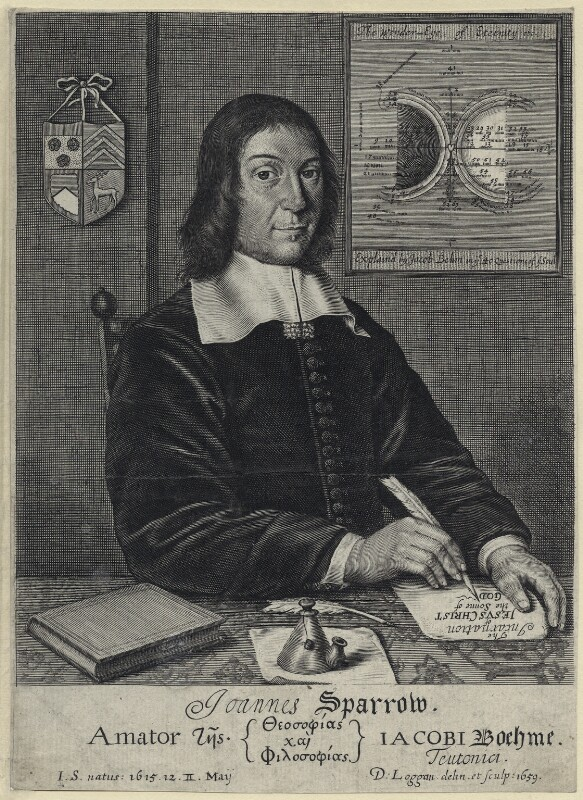
John Sparrow as engraved by David Loggan, 1659, National Portrait Gallery, London.

John Sparrow (1615 – December 1670) was an English translator, best known for his translations of the work of Jakob Böhme. Sparrow attended Trinity College, Cambridge, and entered the Inner Temple in 1633. There is an engraved portrait of John Sparrow in the British Museum and in the National Portrait Gallery, London, made in 1659 by David Loggan (1634–1692).

== Sparrow's Translations of the Works of Jakob Böhme ==
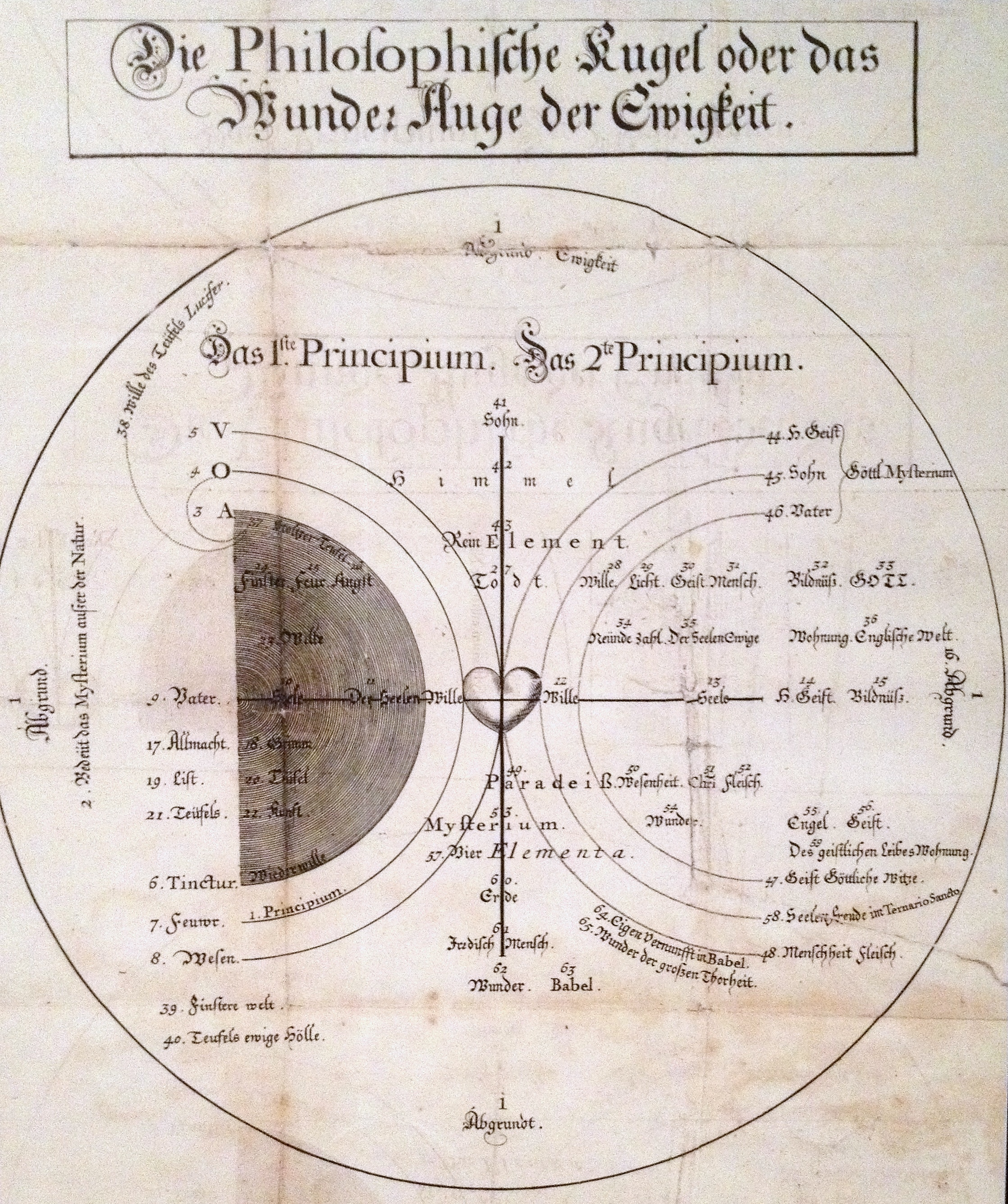
Böhme's cosmogony or the Philosophical Sphere or the Wonder Eye of Eternity (1620).

Between 1645 and 1662 John Sparrow and his cousin John Ellistone translated all the works of the German mystic Jakob Böhme (1575–1624) into English. They were printed by Humphrey Blunden, bookseller in London active between 1635 and 1652, and a few others. The bookseller Giles Calvert was also involved in the publication of Böhme's works. For the translation Sparrow used manuscripts from Abraham Willemszoon van Beyerland, sent from Holland. The image of Böhme's cosmogony or the "Wonder-Eye of Eternity" of 1620 is found on the engraved portrait of John Sparrow, made by David Loggan in 1659. The concept of the "Wonder-Eye of Eternity" is explained in Sparrow's translation of the XL Questions concerning the Soule (1647).

The following text from 1716, a much later date, describes the first English translators of Böhme as learned and pious men who understood the "spirit of the author", (except perhaps for the more obscure passages):

The person that translated these writings was John Sparrow, barrister of the Inner Temple; Mr. Ellistone and Mr. Hotham also have translated one or the other treatise into English, though Sparrow is generally considered the real translator and editor: he was a man of true piety and seems to have penetrated very deeply into the spirit of the author. His translation is considered faithful and correct in most points, except in some of the most obscure passages, which probably he did not apprehend. …. As regards the period, they were all translated towards the end of the reign of Charles I, and printed … during the Civil War except the last volume, which was not printed till the Restoration of Charles II in 1661 and 1662. Some have alleged that King Charles I read and highly esteemed the writings of Boehme (it had been said that he supplied the funds for their publication, and that therefore they are printed so royally).

== Translations by Sparrow, Ellistone, Blunden and Hotham ==
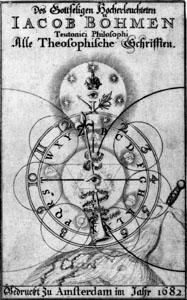
Title page of the Johann Georg Gichtel (1638–1710) edition of 1682, printed in Amsterdam.

The English translations appeared between 1645 and 1662, almost at the same time as the German editions, sometimes even preceding them. Most of the seventeenth-century German editions of the works of Böhme were published in Amsterdam between 1656 and 1678 by Hendrick Beets, who was German. In 1682 appeared the German Johann Georg Gichtel edition in two volumes, printed in Amsterdam. The English translations by John Sparrow, John Ellistone, Humphrey Blunden (printer and bookseller who was active between 1641 and 1667) and Charles Hotham followed the original German texts remarkably closely and they were later used for the William Law edition published between 1764 and 1781.

Published in 1645

1. Two theosophical Epistles; Dialogue between an Enlightened and a Distressed Soul [Anonymous]

2. The Tree of Christian Faith [Anonymous]

Published in 1647

3. XL Questions concerning the Soule [Sparrow]

4. The Clavis or Key … [Sparrow]

Published in 1648

5. Concerning the Three Principles of the Divine Essence [Sparrow]

6. The Threefold Life of Man [Sparrow]

7. The Way to Christ discovered [Blunden]

Published in 1649

8. The Fourth and Fifth Epistles [Sparrow]

9. The Epistles of Jacob Behmen [Ellistone]

10. Mercurius Teutonicus; or Christian Information concerning the last Times … gathered out of the mystical writings of Jacob Behmen [Anonymous]

Published in 1650

11. The High Deep Searching out of the Threefold Life of Man [Sparrow]

Published in 1651

12. Signatura Rerum [Ellistone]

Published in 1652

13. Of Christ's Testaments, viz.: Baptism and the Supper [Sparrow]

Published in 1653

14. A consideration upon the Book of Esaias Stiefel [Anonymous]

Published in 1654

15. Mysterium Magnum [Ellistone and Sparrow]

16. The Tree of Christian Faith [Anonymous]

17. Four Tables of Divine Revelation [Blunden]

18. A consolatory Treatise of the Four Complexions [Charles Hotham]

Published in 1655

19. Table of the Divine Manifestation [Anonymous]

20. Concerning the Election of Grace [Sparrow]

Published in 1656

21. Aurora [Sparrow]

Published in 1659

22. The Fifth Book of the Author, on Incarnation [Sparrow]

Published in 1661

23. Several Treatises [Sparrow]

24. Christian Information: prophetical passages out of Jacob Behmen's Works [Anonymous]

Published in 1662

25. The Remaining of Books [Sparrow]
