= Johann Georg Gichtel =

German mystic (1638–1710)

Johann Georg Gichtel (14 March 1638 – 21 January 1710) was a German mystic and religious leader who was a critic of Lutheranism. His followers ultimately separated from this faith.

== Biography ==
Gichtel was born in the Free Imperial City of Regensburg, where his father was a member of senate. Having acquired at school an acquaintance with Greek, Hebrew, Syriac and even Arabic, he proceeded to Strasbourg to study theology; but finding the theological prelections of J. S. Schmidt and P. J. Spener distasteful, he entered the faculty of law. He was admitted an advocate, first at Speyer, and then at Regensburg; but having become acquainted with the baron Justinianus von Weltz (1621–1668), a Hungarian nobleman who cherished schemes for the reunion of Christendom and the conversion of the world, and having himself become acquainted with another world in dreams and visions, he abandoned all interest in his profession, and became an energetic promoter of the Christerbauliche Jesusgesellschaft (Christian Edification Society of Jesus).

The movement in its beginnings provoked at least no active hostility; but when Gichtel began to attack the teaching of the Lutheran clergy and church, especially upon the fundamental doctrine of justification by faith, he exposed himself to a prosecution which resulted in sentence of banishment and confiscation (1665). After many months of wandering and occasionally romantic adventure, he reached the Netherlands in January 1667, and settled at Zwolle, where he co-operated with Friedrich Breckling (1629–1711), who shared his views and aspirations.

Having become involved in the troubles of this friend, Gichtel, after a period of imprisonment, was banished for a term of years from Zwolle, but finally in 1668 found a home in Amsterdam, where he made the acquaintance of Antoinette Bourignon, and in a state of poverty (which, however, never became destitution) lived out his life of visions and day-dreams, of prophecy and prayer. He gathered a community of the "Brethren of the Angelic Life".

He became an ardent disciple of Jakob Böhme, whose works he published in 1682 (Amsterdam, 2 vols); but before the time of his death, he had attracted to himself a small band of followers known as "Gichtelians" or "Brethren of the Angels," who propagated certain views at which he had arrived independently of Böhme. Seeking ever to hear the authoritative voice of God within them, and endeavouring to attain to a life altogether free from carnal desires, like that of "the angels in heaven, who neither marry nor are given in marriage," they claimed to exercise a priesthood "after the order of Melchizedek," appeasing the wrath of God, and ransoming the souls of the lost by sufferings endured vicariously after the example of Christ.

While, however, Böhme "desired to remain a faithful son of the Church," the Gichtelians became separatists.

== Works ==
Gichtel's correspondence was published without his knowledge by Gottfried Arnold, a disciple, in 1701 (2 vols.), and again in 1708 (3 vols.). It has been frequently reprinted under the title Theosophia practica. The seventh volume of the Berlin edition (1768) contains a notice of Gichtel's life.

== See also ==
- Behmenism
- Esoteric Christianity
- German mysticism
- Rosicrucianism
