= Rite of Memphis-Misraim =

Masonic rite

Ancient and Primitive Rite of Memphis-Misraïm
- Successor: Ancient and Primitive Rite of Memphis-Misraim
- Formation: September 1881
- Type: Freemasonry; Hermeticism; Esotericism
- Headquarters: Naples (originally)
- Location: International
- Parent organization: Rite of Misraïm (1813–1881); Rite of Memphis (1838–1881)

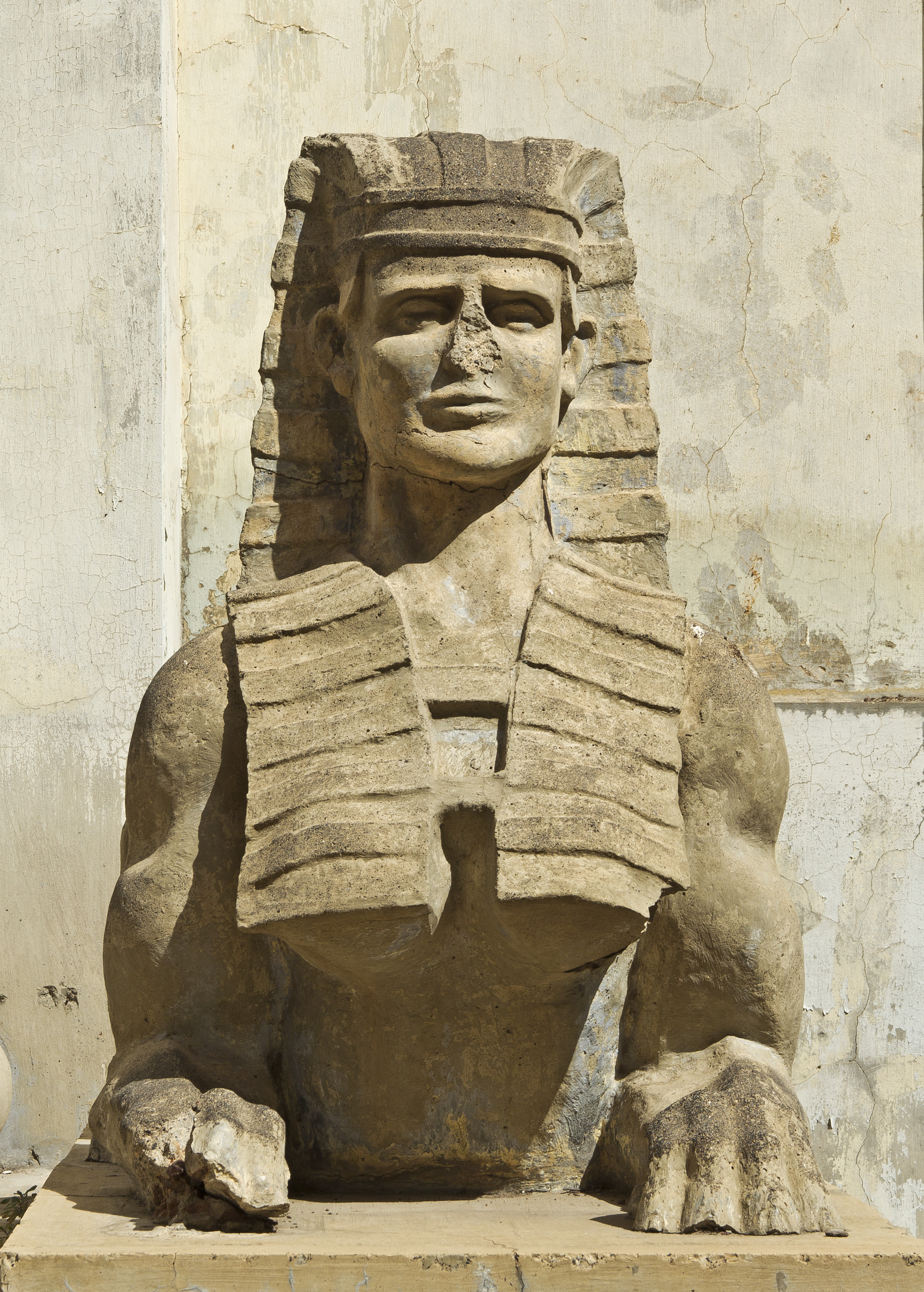
Sphinx sculpture in front of the Masonic temple of Santa Cruz de Tenerife, in the Canary Islands.

The Ancient and Primitive Rite of Memphis-Misraïm is a clandestine masonic rite combining esoteric spirituality with humanitarian ideals. Created in Naples in September 1881, it emerged from the fusion of two distinct masonic systems: the Rite of Misraïm, established in Venice in the late 18th century and brought to France in 1814 by the Bédarride brothers, and the Rite of Memphis, founded by Jacques-Étienne Marconis de Nègre in 1838. The rite is commonly known as "Egyptian Freemasonry" due to its extensive use of hermetic philosophy and Ancient Egyptian symbolism in its degree system and rituals.

Initially led by Giuseppe Garibaldi, the military leader of Italian unification, as its first Grand Hierophant, the rite developed an international presence under subsequent leaders including John Yarker (1902–1913) and Theodor Reuss (1913–1923). While centralized international governance ceased after Reuss's death, national organizations continued independently, particularly in France. There, under successive Grand Masters including Jean Bricaud, Constant Chevillon, and notably Robert Ambelain – who significantly reformed its rituals in 1960 – the rite maintained and developed its distinctive tradition.

The rite is characterized by an elaborate degree system historically ranging from 90 to 99 degrees, though many of these are honorary. It emphasizes both esoteric study and social progress, combining spiritual development through hermetic and kabbalistic teachings with humanitarian ideals. Through various schisms and reorganizations, the rite maintains active lodges in several countries today under different obediences, including the Grand Orient de France since 1862.

== Recognition by mainstream Freemasonry ==
The Rite of Memphis-Misraim has a broad presence across the Masonic world, being practiced by various types of Grand Lodges representing the various traditions of Freemasonry. Several Grand Lodges recognized by the United Grand Lodge of England (UGLE) incorporate this rite into their work,. The rite is also actively worked in lodges under the Grand Orient de France (GODF) and various Grand Lodges that maintain recognition with GODF. Additionally, multiple member organizations of CLIPSAS (Centre de Liaison et d'Information des Puissances maçonniques Signataires de l'Appel de Strasbourg) have embraced this rite. Its practice extends beyond these major Masonic bodies to include numerous independent Grand Lodges worldwide, showcasing its widespread adoption across both conservative and liberal branches of Freemasonry.

== History ==
=== Origins and Philosophical Foundations ===
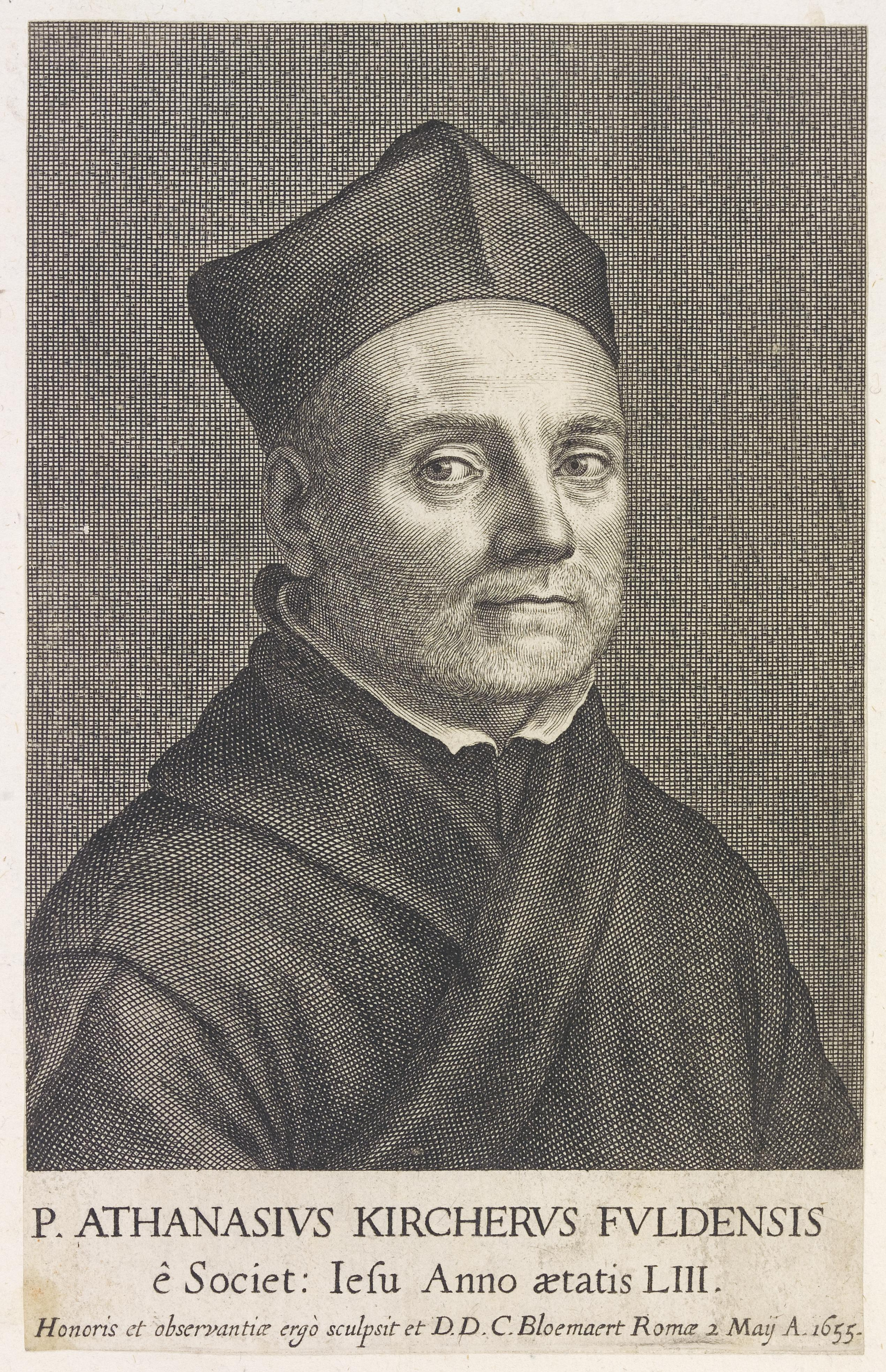
Athanasius Kircher, Egyptosophist and author of "Oedipus aegyptiacus" in 1652.

The Egyptian Masonic rites, with a history spanning over 200 years, claim descent from a Primitive Rite allegedly practiced in Paris in 1721, though this lineage has never been historically verified. They also trace their heritage to the Primitive Rite of the Philadelphians established in Narbonne in 1779. The historical complexity of these rites stems from their unique characteristics: Masonic legitimacy was primarily transmitted through leadership "charters," leaders were appointed for life until 1998, and their minority status within global Masonry has resulted in relatively scarce documentation compared to other Masonic traditions. In Italy, Egyptian Freemasonry, in its structure and in its higher degrees known as the Arcana Arcanorum, finds one of its main sources in the Osirian Egyptian Order, active in Naples since the 18th century. This Order, through the transmission of Hermetic, alchemical, and theurgical knowledge, profoundly influenced the formation of the Rite, integrating elements of Egyptian and Pythagorean tradition.

=== Early Esoteric Influences ===
In late 18th-century France, several initiatic rites and orders emerged, each claiming inheritance from ancient non-Masonic mystical currents. The African Architects appeared in 1767, followed by the Primitive Rite of the Philadelphians in 1780, the Rite of Perfect Initiates of Egypt in 1785, the Sacred Order of the Sophisians in 1801, and the Friends of the Desert in 1806. These organizations drew inspiration from what they termed the "Egyptian tradition," synthesizing various contemporary understandings of ancient wisdom. The intellectual foundation of these rites was built upon several influential texts, including Abbé Jean Terrasson's Life of Sethos (1731), Athanasius Kircher's Oedipus Aegyptiacus (1652), and Antoine Court de Gébelin's Primitive World (1773). These works were complemented by elements from Judeo-Christian Kabbalah, Neoplatonic Hermeticism, and various esoteric and chivalric traditions.

=== The Misraïm Rite ===
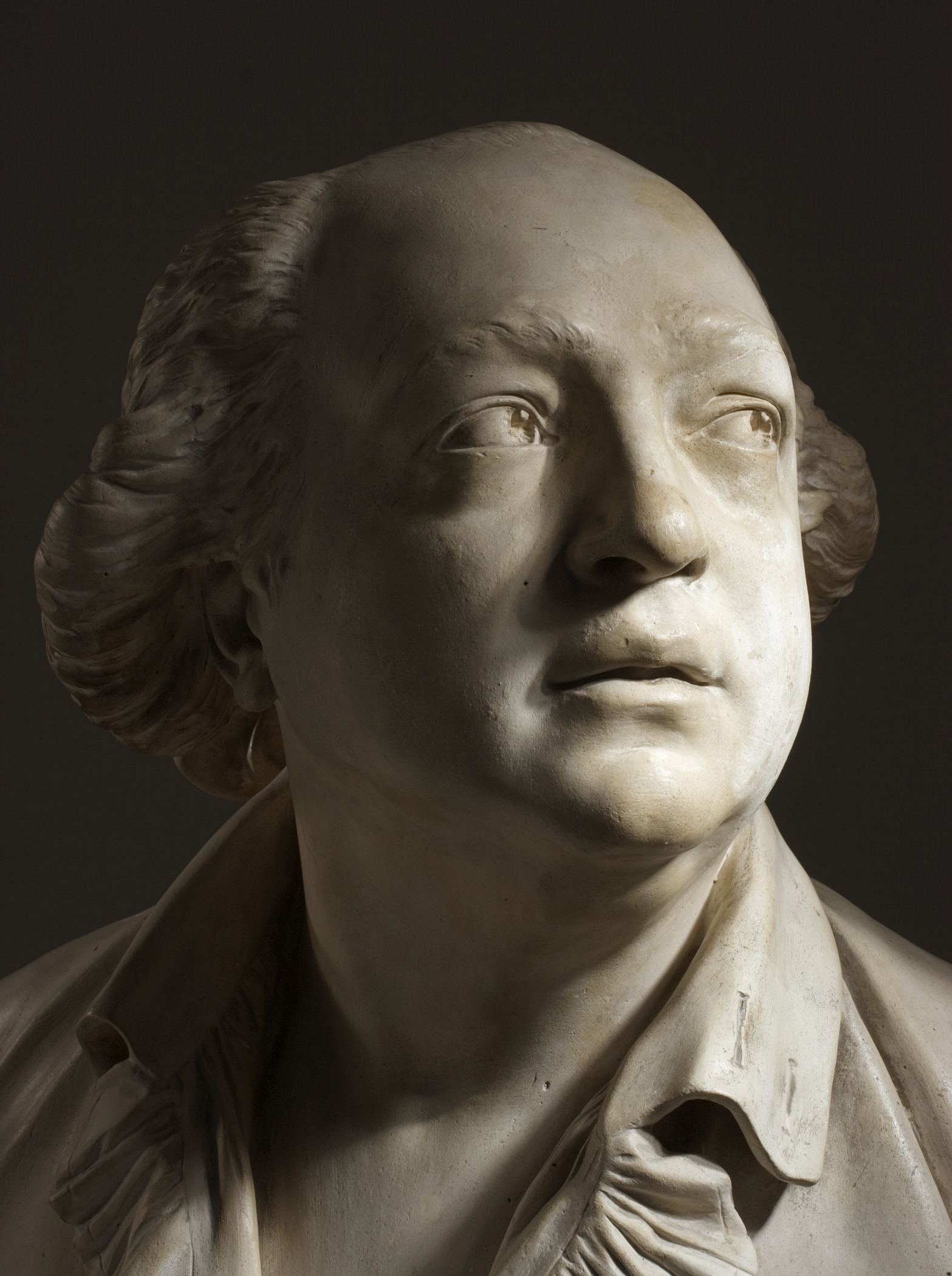
Portrait of Alessandro Cagliostro – founder of a rite in the 1780s of "Egyptian High Masonry".

The first documented French Misraïm lodge was established in Paris during 1814–1815 by the Bédarride brothers – Marc, Michel, and Joseph – who were middle-ranking officers in Napoleon's Italian army. Having brought the rite from Naples, they established what would become a significant presence in French Masonry. Historical research indicates the rite originated in the Republic of Venice, possibly stemming from a patent issued by Alessandro Cagliostro, before spreading through the Franco-Italian lodges of the Kingdom of Naples. The Bédarride brothers' system and charters gained support from prominent Masons, including Thory and Count Muraire, who connected them with Scottish Rite Masons. However, financial difficulties following the end of the Empire led the brothers to commercialize their rite, causing some members to withdraw and unsuccessfully seek admission to the Grand Orient de France's "Grand Consistory" in 1816. The rite faced significant challenges in 1822 when it was banned by the Restoration police after being used as a cover for liberal and republican political networks. Authorities closed approximately ten lodges and confiscated many archives, portions of which remain in the French National Archives. Though the rite received permission to reconstitute under the July Monarchy in 1831, only four Parisian lodges successfully reformed.

=== The Memphis Rite ===
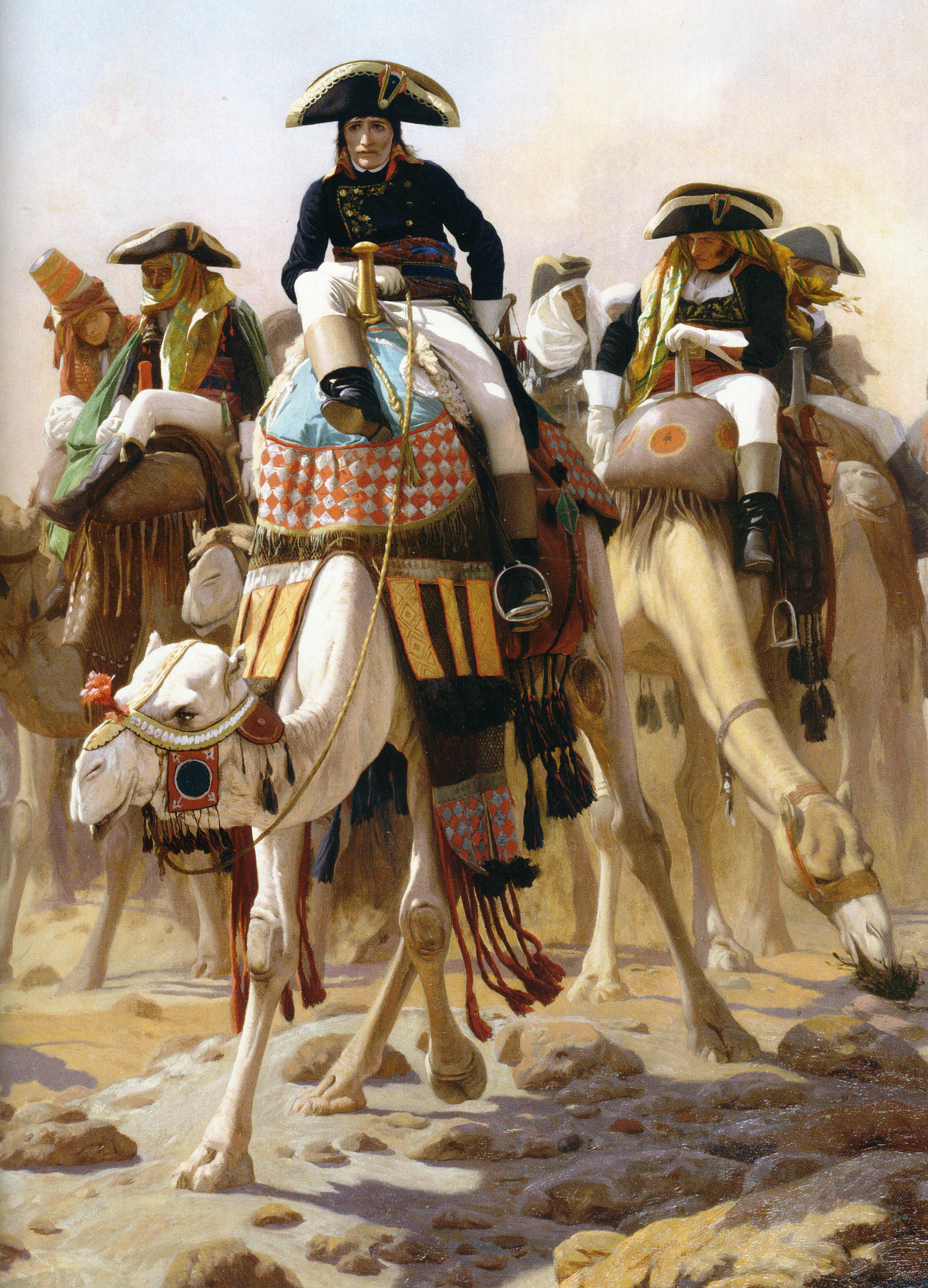
General Bonaparte and his Staff in Egypt by Jean-Léon Gérôme, 1867. It was following the Egyptian Campaign, that Egyptomania developed most significantly in Freemasonry.

Jacques-Étienne Marconis de Nègre (1795–1868) established the Rite of Memphis shortly before 1838 after being expelled from the Misraïm Rite. As Grand Master and Grand Hierophant of his new order, Marconis developed a system that, while never exceeding five or six lodges in 19th-century France, successfully expanded to the United States, Romania, and Egypt. The rite faced opposition in 1841 when, following denunciation by the Bédarride brothers, it was banned in France due to its alleged republican sympathies. In 1862, responding to Marshall Magnan's call for Masonic unity in France, Marconis negotiated the merger of his rite with the Grand Orient de France. This merger would have significant implications for the rite's future development and international expansion.

=== Unification Under Garibaldi ===
The Grand College of Rites of the Grand Orient de France, having become the custodian of the Memphis Rite, officially recognized the Sovereign Sanctuary of Memphis in the United States. Under Seymour's Grand Mastership, this body established numerous lodges both within the United States and internationally, including a Sovereign Sanctuary for Great Britain and Ireland under John Yarker. A pivotal moment occurred in 1881 when Yarker exchanged charters with Pessina's Reformed Misraïm Rite under the aegis of Giuseppe Garibaldi, who became the Grand Hierophant of the unified "Memphis and Misraïm" rites. Following Garibaldi's death, Yarker assumed leadership of the combined rites.

=== The Papus Era and Early 20th century ===
In France, Gérard Encausse, better known as Papus, emerged as a significant figure in esoteric Masonry at the turn of the 20th century. As founder of the Martinist Order and an opponent of the Grand Orient de France, Papus sought to advance esoteric Masonic traditions. After unsuccessful attempts to join both the Grand Lodge Misraïmite and the Grand Lodge of France, he obtained a patent from Yarker to establish a Swedenborgian lodge. His influence grew significantly in 1906 when Yarker authorized him to constitute a Grand Lodge, and in 1908, Théodore Reuss permitted him to establish the lodge "Humanidad," which became the Ancient and Primitive Oriental Rite of Memphis-Misraïm in France. Following Papus's leadership, a succession of notable figures guided the rite through the early 20th century. Teder (Charles Détré) served as Grand Master from 1916 to 1918, followed by Jean Bricaud from 1918 to 1934. Constant Chevillon then assumed leadership until his tragic assassination by the French Militia in 1944. Henri-Charles Dupont subsequently led the order from 1945 to 1960.

=== The Ambelain Period ===
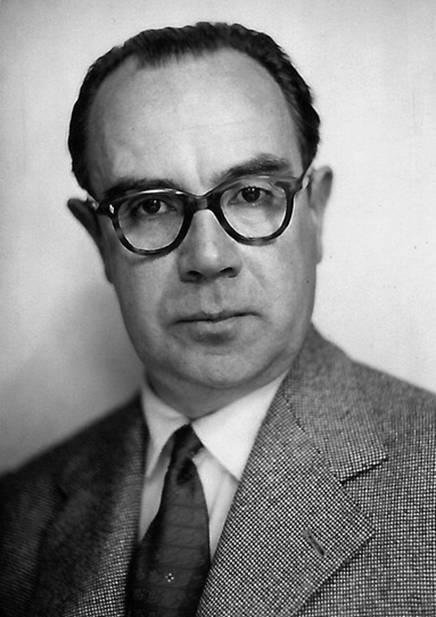
Robert Ambelain took leadership of the rite in 1960 and deeply reformed its rituals.

A significant transformation of the rite occurred under Robert Ambelain, who assumed direction in 1960. Ambelain undertook a comprehensive reform of the rituals and renamed his obedience the "French Grand Lodge of the Ancient and Primitive Rite of Memphis-Misraïm." His tenure marked a period of substantial development and systematization of the rite's practices. In 1985, Ambelain transmitted his succession to Gérard Kloppel, initiating a new phase in the rite's history.

=== The 1998 Schism and Contemporary Development ===
The dissolution of the French Grand Lodge of the Ancient and Primitive Rite of Memphis-Misraïm began to take shape in 1995. Several fundamental issues contributed to this fragmentation, including debates over lodge gender integration, the independence of the first three degrees' workshops from those of the higher degrees, lifetime leadership appointments, and the distinction between rite and obedience. These tensions culminated in a significant crisis following the creation of a mixed Egyptian "path" in 1997. The definitive break occurred on January 24, 1998, when the obedience split into two branches. One faction formed the Symbolic Grand Lodge of France under Georges Claude Vieilledent's leadership, while the other remained loyal to Gérard Kloppel under the name French Male Grand Lodge of Memphis Misraïm. Following this division, Kloppel created the Traditional Grand Lodge of Memphis-Misraim by patent of March 15, 1998, then on May 5, 1998 transmitted his office of World Grand Master to Cheikna Sylla. He remained in the Traditional Grand Lodge of Memphis-Misraïm as a simple member until 2007. The original French Grand Lodge of the Ancient and Primitive Rite of Memphis-Misraïm was ultimately dissolved by the Créteil tribunal.

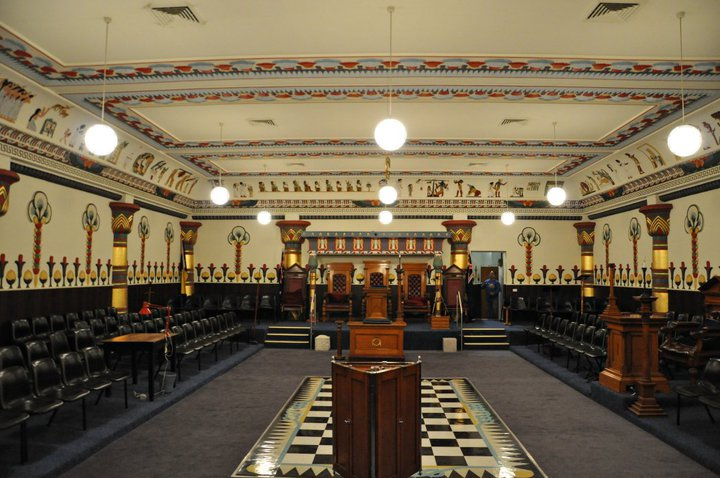
The Egyptian temple of Freemason Hall in Australia, 2014. The columns on both sides are palmiform.

=== Contemporary Practice and Organization ===
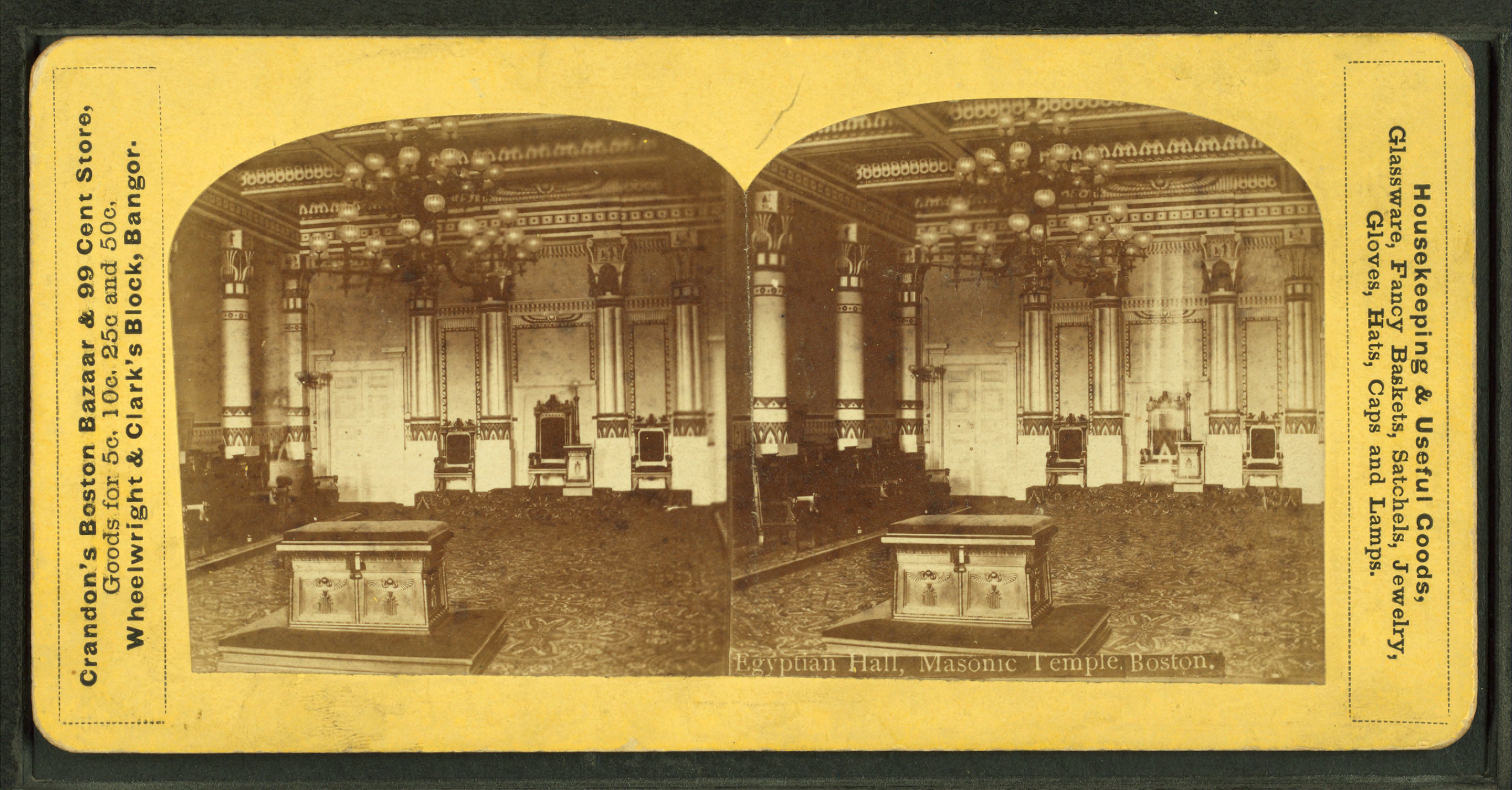
Stereoscopic view from 1867 of the Egyptian hall in the Masonic temple of Boston.

As of 2012, approximately 175 lodges in France worked with the Memphis-Misraïm Rite, with 40 operating within the Grand Orient de France. The rite maintains a unique characteristic in Masonic practice: its filiation can be transmitted through a single individual, male or female, once they achieve certain degrees (90th for Misraïm, 95th for Memphis-Misraïm). This feature has led to both flexibility in establishing new branches and challenges in verifying legitimacy. In addition to organized lodges, there exists an undetermined number of independent lodges practicing Egyptian rites, including a research and study lodge in Paris that has revived Marconis de Nègre's 1838 ritual. The rite continues to be practiced by numerous obediences worldwide, maintaining its distinctive focus on Egyptian cultural elements and the relationship between humanity and the sacred.

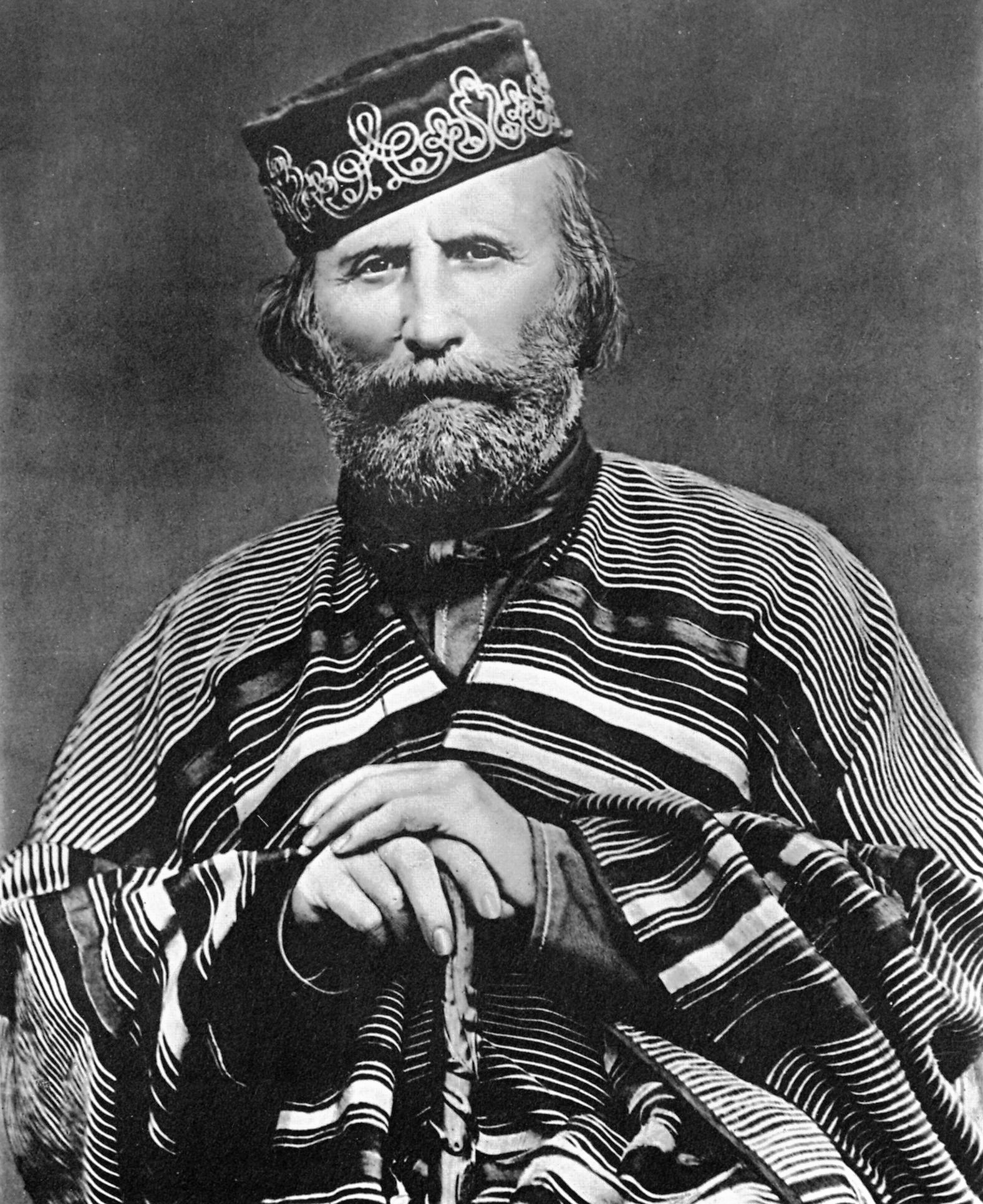
Giuseppe Garibaldi, "Grand Hierophant" in 1881 of the two united rites, "Memphis and Misraim".

=== Philosophical Foundations ===
The Egyptian rites fundamentally differ from other Masonic traditions in their deep connection to Egyptian culture, particularly focusing on humanity's relationship with the sacred. They preserve the ancient Egyptian distinction between "true" and "real," attempting to revive ancient mysteries within a Masonic framework. This philosophical approach has helped maintain the rite's unique character while adapting to modern Masonic practice. The contemporary practice of Memphis-Misraïm continues to reflect this philosophical heritage, emphasizing both esoteric knowledge and practical wisdom. The rite maintains its position as a unique bridge between ancient Egyptian mysteries and modern Masonic tradition, though its practice has evolved significantly from its 18th and 19th-century origins.

== Degrees of the Ancient and Primitive Rite of Memphis in the 99 degree system ==
The traditional 99 degrees of the rite.

Degree	Title	Description	Class	Notes
Symbolic Lodge
1°	Apprentice Mason	First degree of Masonry	Symbolic Lodge	Must be conferred in Lodge
2°	Companion Mason	Second degree of Masonry	Symbolic Lodge	Must be conferred in Lodge
3°	Master Mason	Third degree of Masonry	Symbolic Lodge	Must be conferred in Lodge
Lodges of Perfection
4°	Secret Master	Teaches truth and the existence of one God	Lodge of Perfection	—
5°	Perfect Master	Teaches the love of God for the human race	Lodge of Perfection	Must be conferred in Lodge
6°	Intimate Secretary	Develops and proves the doctrine of immortality	Lodge of Perfection	Must be conferred in Lodge
7°	Provost and Judge	Teaches justice as divine consequence	Lodge of Perfection	Must be conferred in Lodge
8°	Intendant of the Buildings	Teaches the necessity of order	Lodge of Perfection	—
9°	Master Elect of Nine	Teaches proper administration of justice	Lodge of Perfection	Must be conferred in Lodge
10°	Illustrious Elect of Fifteen	Teaches proper governance	Lodge of Perfection	—
11°	Sublime Knight Elect	Teaches legislative representation	Lodge of Perfection	—
12°	Grand Master Architect	Teaches value of labor	Lodge of Perfection	—
13°	Royal Arch	Studies divine knowledge	Lodge of Perfection	Must be conferred in Lodge
14°	Grand Elect of the Sacred Vault (called Jacques VI or Sublime Mason)	Rewards of Masonic labor	Lodge of Perfection	Must be conferred in Lodge
Chapters
15°	Knight of the East or of the Sword	Teaches hope and faith	Chapter	—
16°	Prince of Jerusalem	Teaches eternal Masonic doctrine	Chapter	—
17°	Knight of the East and West	Teaches pioneering spirit	Chapter	—
18°	Sublime Prince Rose-Croix	Intellectual inheritance	Chapter	Must be conferred in Lodge
Senates
19°	Grand Pontiff or Sublime Scottish Mason of the Heavenly Jerusalem	Teaches civil and religious toleration	Senate	—
20°	Knight of the Temple	Teaches necessity of caution	Senate	—
21°	Noachite or Prussian Knight	Teaches vindication of truth	Senate	—
22°	Knight of the Royal Arch or Prince of Lebanon	Teaches vigilance	Senate	—
23°	Chief of the Tabernacle	Studies sacred doctrine	Senate	—
24°	Prince of the Tabernacle	Teaches opposition to sectarianism	Senate	—
25°	Knight of the Brazen Serpent	Teaches liberty and equality	Senate	Must be conferred in Lodge
26°	Scottish Trinitarian or Prince of Mercy	Teaches philosophical alliance	Senate	—
27°	Grand Commander of the Temple	Teaches universal peace	Senate	—
28°	Knight of the Sun or Prince Adept	Shows Masonic doctrine's result	Senate	Must be conferred in Lodge
29°	Grand Scottish Knight of St. Andrew of Scotland, Prince of Light	Teaches perseverance	Senate	—
Areopages and Tribunals
30°	Grand Elect Knight Kadosh, Knight of the White and Black Eagle	Teaches defense of rights	Areopage	Must be conferred in Lodge
31°	Grand Inspector Inquisitor Commander	Focuses on Masonic justice	Areopage	Must be conferred in Lodge
32°	Sublime Prince of the Royal Secret	Studies metaphysics	Areopage	Must be conferred in Lodge
33°	Sovereign Grand Inspector General	Teaches divine rights	Areopage	Must be conferred in Lodge
Grand Consistories
34°	Knight of Scandinavia	Studies Norse mythology	Grand Consistory	Must be conferred in Lodge
35°	Sublime Commander of the Temple	Studies Temple mysteries	Grand Consistory	Must be conferred in Lodge
36°	Sublime Negotiate	Studies geometry and astronomy	Grand Consistory	Must be conferred in Lodge
37°	Knight of Shota (Adept of Truth)	Studies ancient initiations	Grand Consistory	Must be conferred in Lodge
38°	Sublime Elect of Truth	Studies ancient mysteries	Grand Consistory	Must be conferred in Lodge
39°	Grand Elect of the Aeons	Studies divine economy	Grand Consistory	—
40°	Sage Sivaist (Perfect Sage)	Studies natural laws	Grand Consistory	—
41°	Knight of the Rainbow	Studies solar symbolism	Grand Consistory	—
42°	Prince of Light	Studies purity and justice	Grand Consistory	—
43°	Sublime Hermetic Sage	Studies birth and death symbolism	Grand Consistory	Must be conferred in Lodge
44°	Prince of the Zodiac	Studies celestial correspondences	Grand Consistory	—
45°	Sublime Sage of the Mysteries	Studies light and darkness	Grand Consistory	—
46°	Sublime Pastor of the Huts	Studies alchemy	Grand Consistory	—
47°	Knight of the Seven Stars	Studies stellar symbolism	Grand Consistory	—
48°	Sublime Guardian of the Sacred Mount	Studies highest mysteries	Grand Consistory	—
49°	Sublime Sage of the Pyramids	Studies initiation paths	Grand Consistory	Must be conferred in Lodge
50°	Sublime Philosopher of Samothrace	Studies Great Gods mysteries	Grand Consistory	—
51°	Sublime Titan of Caucasus	Studies Promethean myth	Grand Consistory	Must be conferred in Lodge
52°	Sage of the Labyrinth	Studies Hermeticism	Grand Consistory	—
53°	Knight of the Phoenix	Studies regeneration	Grand Consistory	—
54°	Sublime Scalde	Studies world traditions	Grand Consistory	—
55°	Sublime Orphic Doctor	Studies Orphic mysteries	Grand Consistory	Must be conferred in Lodge
56°	Pontiff of Cadmia	Studies alchemical work	Grand Consistory	—
57°	Sublime Mage	Studies spirit and matter	Grand Consistory	—
58°	Prince Brahmin	Studies Brahmanic wisdom	Grand Consistory	Must be conferred in Lodge
59°	Grand Pontiff of Ogygia	Studies Homeric wisdom	Grand Consistory	—
60°	Sublime Guardian of the Three Fires	Studies tripartite nature	Grand Consistory	—
61°	Sublime Unknown Philosopher	Studies occult medicine	Grand Consistory	—
62°	Sublime Sage of Eleusis	Studies Eleusinian mysteries	Grand Consistory	Must be conferred in Lodge
63°	Sublime Kawi	Studies love and union	Grand Consistory	—
64°	Sage of Mithra	Studies Mithraic mysteries	Grand Consistory	Must be conferred in Lodge
65°	Patriarch Grand Installer	Guards sacred knowledge	Grand Consistory	Must be conferred in Lodge
66°	Patriarch Grand Consecrator	Preserves sacred rites	Grand Consistory	Must be conferred in Lodge
67°	Patriarch Grand Eulogist	Maintains traditions	Grand Consistory	Must be conferred in Lodge
68°	Patriarch of Truth	Studies Heliopolis wisdom	Grand Consistory	Must be conferred in Lodge
69°	Knight of the Golden Branch of Eleusis	Studies initiation symbols	Grand Consistory	—
70°	Patriarch of the Planispheres	Studies divine wisdom	Grand Consistory	Must be conferred in Lodge
71°	Patriarch of the Sacred Vedas	Studies Hindu wisdom	Grand Consistory	Must be conferred in Lodge
Grand Councils
72°	Sublime Master of Wisdom	Studies mystery traditions	Grand Council	—
73°	Doctor of Sacred Fire	Studies occult fire	Grand Council	—
74°	Sublime Master of the Sloka	Studies sacred rhythm	Grand Council	—
75°	Knight of the Libyan Chain	Supreme Consistory degree	Grand Council	Must be conferred in Lodge
76°	Patriarch of Isis	Studies hieroglyphics	Grand Council	Must be conferred in Lodge
77°	Sublime Knight Theosopher	Studies comparative religion	Grand Council	—
78°	Grand Pontiff of Thebes	Studies Theban wisdom	Grand Council	—
79°	Knight of the Formidable Sadah	Studies mystery constancy	Grand Council	—
80°	Sublime Elect of the Sanctuary	Studies Ra mythology	Grand Council	—
81°	Patriarch of Memphis	Studies Horus tradition	Grand Council	Must be conferred in Lodge
82°	Grand Elect of Midgard	Studies Norse cosmology	Grand Council	—
83°	Sublime Knight of the Valley of Oddy	Studies Egyptian Ennead	Grand Council	—
84°	Doctor of the Izeds	Studies Zoroastrian hierarchy	Grand Council	—
85°	Sublime Master of the Luminous Ring	Studies Egyptian symbols	Grand Council	—
86°	Pontiff of Serapis	Studies sacred wisdom	Grand Council	—
87°	Sublime Prince of Masonry	Reviews all degrees	Grand Council	Must be conferred in Lodge
88°	Grand Elect of the Sacred Court	Studies esoteric teaching	Grand Council	Must be conferred in Lodge
89°	Patriarch of the Mystic City	Studies Truth and Hope	Grand Council	Must be conferred in Lodge
90°	Patriarch Sublime Master of the Great Work	Studies supreme alchemy	Grand Council	Must be conferred in Lodge
Grand Tribunals
91°	Sublime Patriarch Grand Defender of the Order	Guards Order's integrity	Grand Tribunal	Must be conferred in Lodge
Grand Mystic Temples
92°	Sublime Catechist	Teaches Order's wisdom	Grand Mystic Temple	—
93°	Grand Inspector Regulator General	Regulates Order's work	Grand Mystic Temple	—
94°	Sublime Patriarch of Memphis	Preserves Memphis tradition	Grand Mystic Temple	Must be conferred in Lodge
Sovereign Sanctuaries
95°	Sublime Patriarch Grand Conservator	Conserves Order's traditions	Sovereign Sanctuary	Must be conferred in Lodge
96°	National Deputy Grand Master	Vice-President of National Sanctuary	Sovereign Sanctuary	Must be conferred in Lodge
97°	National Grand Master	President of National Sanctuary	Sovereign Sanctuary	—
98°	World Deputy Grand Master	Vice-President of International Sanctuary	Sovereign Sanctuary	—
99°	Most Serene Grand Master of the World, Grand Hierophant	President of International Sanctuary	Sovereign Sanctuary	—

=== Classes of Degrees ===
- Symbolic Lodge (1°-3°)
- Lodges of Perfection (4°-14°)
- Chapters (15°-18°)
- Senates (19°-29°)
- Areopages and Tribunals (30°-33°)
- Grand Consistories (34°-71°)
- Grand Councils (72°-90°)
- Grand Tribunals (91°)
- Grand Mystic Temples (92°-94°)
- Sovereign Sanctuaries (95°-99°)

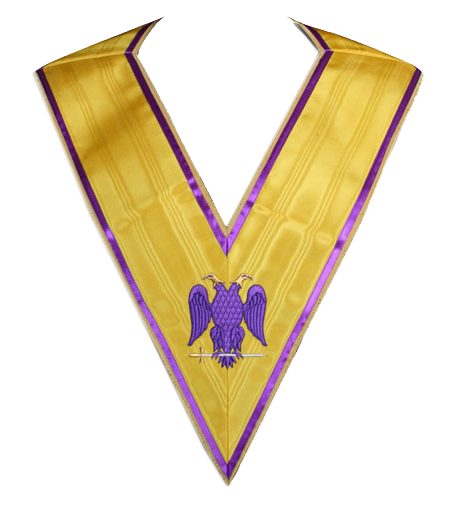
Collar of the 95th degree of the Memphis-Misraim Rite.

== 33-Degree system of the Memphis-Misraim or Egyptian Rite ==
As practiced at the Grand Orient de France following the 1862 fusion agreement by Marconis de Nègre.

Degree	Title	Notes
Symbolic Blue Lodge (1°-3°)
1°	Apprentice Mason	Must be conferred in Lodge
2°	Companion Mason	Must be conferred in Lodge
3°	Master Mason	Must be conferred in Lodge
Egyptian colleges (4°-30°)
4°	Discreet Master	—
5°	Sublime Master – Master of Angles	—
6°	Knight of the Sacred Arch	—
7°	Knight of the Secret Vault	—
8°	Knight of the Sword	—
9°	Knight of Jerusalem	—
10°	Knight of the East	—
11°	Knight Rose-Croix	—
12°	Knight of the Red Eagle	Must be conferred in Lodge
13°	Knight of the Temple	—
14°	Knight of the Tabernacle	—
15°	Knight of the Serpent	—
16°	Knight Kadosh	—
17°	Knight of the Royal Mystery	—
18°	Grand Inspector	—
19°	Sage of Truth	—
20°	Hermetic Philosopher	Must be conferred in Lodge
21°	Patriarch Grand Installer	—
22°	Patriarch Grand Consecrator	—
23°	Patriarch Grand Eulogist	—
24°	Patriarch of Truth	—
25°	Patriarch of the Planispheres	—
26°	Patriarch of the Sacred Vedas	—
27°	Egyptian Master – Patriarch of Isis	Must be conferred in Lodge
28°	Patriarch of Memphis	—
29°	Patriarch of the Mystic City	—
30°	Sublime Master of the Great Work	Must be conferred in Lodge
Egyptian Academy (31°-32°)
31°	Grand Defender of the Rite	Must be conferred in Lodge
32°	Prince of Memphis	Must be conferred in Lodge
Sovereign Sanctuary (33°)
33°	Patriarch Grand Conservator (A∴A∴)	Must be conferred in Lodge

=== Notes ===
- This system represents the condensed 33-degree version established by the 1862 fusion agreement
- Degrees marked in pink must be conferred through full ceremonial initiation
- Other degrees may be communicated without special ceremony
- The system is divided into four main sections:
  - Blue Lodge (1°-3°)
  - Egyptian Colleges (4°-30°)
  - Egyptian Academy (31°-32°)
  - Sovereign Sanctuary (33°)

== Prominent members ==
Some of the most prominent figures in European occultism have been associated with the Rite, including the Frenchmen Gerard Encausse (Papus), Charles Detré (Teder), Jean Bricaud, Constant Chevillon, Charles-Henry Dupont and Robert Ambelain, and the Italians Giuliano Kremmerz and Giustiniano Lebano. As shown, Michael Bertiaux has also been a major, though pragmatically quiet, major figure in the Rite. The National Grand Master in Germany from 1906 to 1914 was Rudolf Steiner, and the founder of the Thule Society, Adam Alfred Rudolf Glauer (Rudolf von Sebottendorf), became an initiate while living in Turkey. The German founder of the Fraternitas Rosicruciana Antiqua, Arnold Krumm-Heller, was also associated. Aleister Crowley, was at one time affiliated with the rite in its shortened version used by Ordo Templi Orientis. In the United States, Harvey Spencer Lewis, founder of the Ancient Mystical Order Rosae Crucis, AMORC, was also associated with the rite.

== Universal Grand Hierophants ==
- Giuseppe Garibaldi (1881–1882)
- Giambattista Pessina (1882–1900)
- Ferdinando Francesco degli Oddi (1900–1902)
- John Yarker (1902–1913)
- Theodor Reuss (1913–1923)

== See also ==
- French Rite
- Ancient and Primitive Rite
- List of Masonic Rites
- Philadelphes
- Ordo Templi Orientis
- Osirian Egyptian Order
