= Osirian Egyptian Order =

Italian esoteric order

Ordine Osirideo Egizio
- Ordine Osirideo Egizio
- Formation: c. 1747
- Founder: Raimondo De Sangro
- Type: Esoteric order
- Headquarters: Naples, Kingdom of the Two Sicilies
- Official language: Italian, French

Ordine Osirideo Egizio (Egyptian Osirian Order) is an Italian esoteric order founded in Naples in the mid-18th century. It centers on the revival and adaptation of ancient Egyptian and Alexandrian Hermetic traditions through a Neapolitan initiatory lineage.

== History ==
The Order affirms itself originated from a Greek-Alexandrian colony established around Via Nilo in Naples, where Egyptian cults merged with Italic Hermeticism and Pythagoreanism, creating an unbroken initiatory chain that extended into the 20th century. Among the early Hermetic figures are Raimondo Lullo, Giordano Bruno, and Tommaso Campanella, all active near San Domenico Maggiore. At the end of the 17th century, Rosicrucian and Hermetic currents flourished in Naples. Alchemical exchanges between Federico Gualdi and a Neapolitan ecclesiastic are documented through period correspondence; the Academy of Christina of Sweden promoted Neoplatonic and Kabbalistic studies attended by Giovan Battista Della Porta and Francesco Maria Santinelli. Raimondo De Sangro's Hermetic library included Pietro Valeriano's Hieroglyphica and works by Athanasius Kircher, indicating his interest in Egyptian symbolism. In 1766–67, Cagliostro, under the pseudonym "Marchese Pellegrini," arrived in Naples and introduced the "Arcana Arcanorum" degrees in lodges led by Luigi d'Aquino di Caramanico, connecting De Sangro's tradition to the French Egyptian Rite. The circle of De Sangro also included the Kabbalist Giuseppe Athias of Livorno—described by Giambattista Vico as "the most learned of contemporary Jews in the sacred language"—and it is hypothesized that De Sangro was familiar with the writings of Cardinal Egidio Antonini of Viterbo on Jewish mysticism.

Domenico Bocchini organized the rituals of the Order in lodges of the Scottish and Misraïm Rite, mentoring Pasquale De Servis and influencing Giustiniano Lebano. In 1890, Giuliano Kremmerz (Ciro Formisano) founded the Miriam Therapeutic Brotherhood as a complementary "academy," although the authorities of the Egyptian Rite considered it a desecration. In the 20th century, the Order continued under leaders such as Eugenio Jacobitti, Giacomo Catinella, and Arturo Reghini. Post-war correspondence (Lombardi–Suglia, 1947) attests to its clandestine continuity, with Florence serving as the temporary headquarters of the General Secretariat.

== Doctrine and Organization ==
The path culminates in the three "Arcana Arcanorum" degrees (87°–89° Misraïm; sometimes 90°), known as the Neapolitan Ladder. These degrees synthesize Egyptian-Alexandrian Hermeticism, alchemy, angelology, and Gnostic evocation, without replicating pharaonic rituals. Access required Blue Masonry (Apprentice–Companion–Master), but later extended to non-Masons. For advanced teaching, semi-secret "Miriamic academies" were established.

== Critical Evaluation ==
Scholars emphasize that "particular archives" and "fortunate discoveries" should not be accepted uncritically. The genealogies connecting the De Sangro family to Burgundian dukes, Lombards, and Templar rites in Torremaggiore are based on local tradition and selective medieval sources, not on continuous verifiable documentation.

== See also ==
- Giuliano Kremmerz
- Hermeticism
- Western esotericism
- Rite of Memphis-Misraim
- Mysteries of Osiris

== Bibliography ==
Bramato, Francesco (1980). La Massoneria a Napoli nel Settecento. Ravenna: Longo. ISBN 9788880631002.

Crocco, A., ed. (n.d.). Breve nota di ciò che si vede nella casa del Principe di San Severo. Napoli: Ni.Sa.

Brunelli, Francesco (1981). Rituali dei gradi della Massoneria di Memphis e Misraïm. Foggia: Bastogi.

Caillet, Serge (2003). La Franc-Maçonnerie égyptienne de Memphis-Misraïm. Paris: Dervy.

D’Andrea, Fabio (n.d.). Raimondo Di Sangro, principe di San Severo e la tradizione egizia napoletana.

De Sangro, Ottavio (1991). Raimondo de Sangro e la Cappella San Severo. Rome: Bulzoni.

De Sangro, Raimondo (2002). Spruit, L. (ed.). Lettera Apologetica. Napoli: Alòs.

De Sangro, Raimondo (1999). Lacerenza, G. C. (ed.). La luce eterna. Foggia: Bastogi.

De Sangro, Raimondo (2007). Spruit, L. (ed.). Supplica. Napoli: Alòs.

De Sangro, Raimondo (n.d.). Crocco, A. (ed.). Lettere al Cavaliere Giovanni Giraldi. L. Regina.

Ghirardini, Carla (n.d.). Automata sonori, strumenti popolari ed esotici nel Gabinetto armonico di Filippo Bonanni.

Haven, M., ed. (2003). Rituale della Massoneria Egiziana. Paris: Téletès.

Höbel, Sigfrido E. F. (2004). Il fiume segreto. Napoli: Stamperia del Valentino. ISBN 9788888444154.

Hornung, Erik (2006). L'Egitto esoterico. Torino: Lindau.

Labouré, Didier (2002). I segreti della Massoneria Egiziana. St-Chef: Chariot d’Or. ISBN 9782913104006.

Labouré, Didier (2004). Breve (vera) storia dei Riti Egizi Massonici. St-Chef: Chariot d’Or. ISBN 9782913104068.
