= Robert Ambelain =

French essayist (1907–1997)

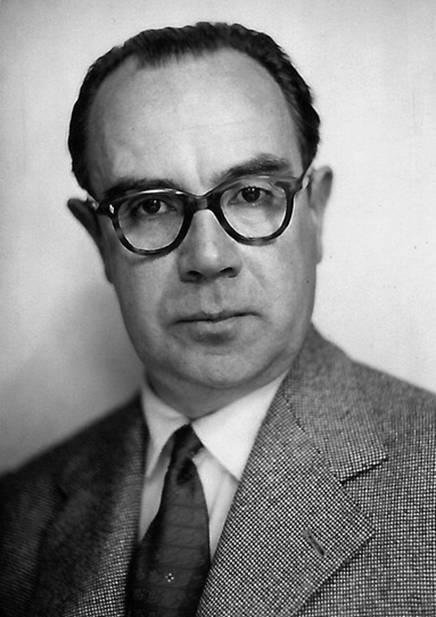
- Born: 2 September 1907
- Died: 27 May 1997 (aged 89)
- Writing career
- Genre: Essays

Signature
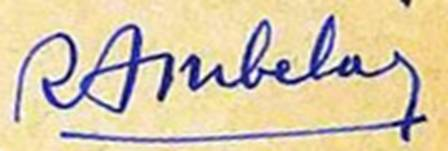

Robert Ambelain (2 September 1907 – 27 May 1997) was a French essayist. He was involved in the esoteric Masonic Martinist movement and claimed to have revived the Primitive Scottish Rite. He has written several works, such as The Masonic Secret, in which he tells the most relevant aspects of Masonic lodges.

== The reawakening of the Élus Coëns ==
In 1943, Robert Ambelain, whose mystical name was Aurifer, revived the Order of the Élus Coëns. The other two esotericists who signed the Charter to revive the Order were Robert Amadou (1924 – 2006) and Roger Ménard. Georges Bogé de Lagrèze (1882-1946) was elected Grand Master and Ambelain his Deputy Grand Master.

The degrees of this new Order were the Operative degrees of the original Élus Coëns, reconstituted with the scarce material Ambelain had in his hands. The name of the Order was later changed in “Ordre Martiniste des Élus Cohens”, where candidates were also initiated into the usual three degrees of Martinism; this was the ‘outer order’ which formed the ante-chamber of the Operative degrees.

Ambelain, who always looked for possibilities to expand the Order, introduced elements that had nothing to do with the original Coëns: Neo-Gnosticism, Qabalah and Memphis-Misraim among others. This happened because he did not have enough material to actually do all the degrees, and found in other traditions a good solution to fill the gaps. This was quite easy for him because he was the leader of several initiatic organisations, which were closely linked with each other: The Martinist Order, the Rite of Memphis-Misraim, the Élus Coëns, the Kabbalistic Order of the Rose+Cross, the Ecclesia Gnostica Apostolica and the Gnostic Catholic Apostolic Church.

Ambelain entrusted its leadership to Ivan Mosca (1915 – 2005) – mystical name Hermete – who made the Order dormant in 1968 and then reawakened it in 1995. Upon the death of Mosca, who did not designate successors, two groups claimed the legitimate succession, a Spanish and an Italian-French one. A third group also reconstructed its ‘regularity’ within the Order of the United Rites of Memphis Misraim, through an Ambelain-Kloppel-Castelli lineage, and proceeded with a philological reconstruction of the original rituals and operations.

== Writings ==
- "Spiritual Alchemy". The Inner Path
- "Martinism". Man Myth and Magic 62 (London: Purnell, 1971), 1746–47.
- Jésus ou le mortel secret des Templiers, Paris, Robert Laffont, «Les Énigmes de l'Univers», 1970. ISBN 2221005031
