= Grand Loge des Philadelphes =

Masonic lodge in London

The Grand Loge des Philadelphes (or just Philadelphes) was a masonic lodge founded in London by French exiles in 1850, associated with the Quarante-Huitards. It was originally named Les Sectateurs de Ménès (French for 'Disciples of Menes') after the Egyptian pharaoh Menes, but changed its name in 1853. Among its members were Charles Bradlaugh and fellow freethinker Austin Holyoake. It was associated with the Conseil Suprême de l’Ordre Maconnique de Memphis, a Masonic order, and the Rite of Memphis. The Grand Lodge of England opposed the Philadelphes, as it counted a number of atheists among its members and did not mandate religious observance.

It became a centre for conspiratorial revolutionary activity. It had seemingly close ties with French revolutionary Charles Nodier (presumed grand master of the prieure de' sion at the period.) Nodier even spoke of the secret society after he published his book on the subject in 1822.

In the beginning it was made up mainly of French émigrés. From 1852 onwards, it had close ties with the political group La Commune Révolutionnaire, which it appears to have founded, as all of the prominent members of one organization were members of the other. Although some associates of Blanqui were involved, such as Jean Baptiste Rougé and Theophile Thoré, they did not play a prominent role. This was taken rather by Montagnards or Jacobins, most of them with a long track record of conspiratorial politics.

Aside from La Commune Révolutionnaire, they also founded the "International Association", which existed from 1855 to 1859. Its principal tasks, as set out in its constitution, consisted of spreading the doctrine of solidarity and preparing to implement "the ideal of our hearts, the Universal Democratic and Social Republic". However, despite trying to develop ties with English Chartists, it remained an organisation of émigrés in England and America. Although it has been claimed that this was the first form of international proletarianism, it remained a conspiratorial group more like Mazzini's Young Europe. They were also supporters of individual acts of terror. Following Felice Orsini's attempt on Napoleon III's life, the British government tried to put Simon François Bernard, another émigré, on trial. The Philadelphians defended both Bernard's actions and the assassination of tyrants. Indeed Adolphe Talandier, Gustave Jourdain, Joseph Holyoake and Félix Pyat (all Philadelphians) were the only people who spoke at his funeral a few years later. They also laid on a banquet (under the name of the Lodge) for Paolo Tibaldi when he arrived in London after serving a prison sentence for an attempt on the life of Napoleon III. Louis Blanc, Talandier and Gustave Flourens (another Philadelphian) spoke on this occasion.

The Philadelphians recruited principally amongst revolutionary socialists, but gained few recruits in Italian émigré circles because of their sharp criticisms of Mazzini. Hence the lack of Italians in the International Association. This however changed in 1858-9 as the war between Piedmont and Austria started to brew. Despite the publication of a Manifesto criticising Mazzini for his anti-socialist stance emanating from the International Association, it was not signed by any of the leaders of La Commune Révolutionnaire or the Philadelphians. Evidence in the Vienna Staatsarchiv shows that there was a faction fight, and that the Philadelphians were opting for a rapprochement with Mazzini. Napoleon III's support for Piedmont facilitated Garibaldi's victories, even if they did not indicate a leftward political trajectory on behalf of the emperor.

Following his campaign in Italy, Garibaldi set up the International Legion, led by Ludwik Mieroslawski, and from 1859 to 1864 the Philadelphians concentrated on giving him support. According to Le monde maçonnique (1874) Garibaldi, Mazzini, Charles Bradlaugh and Louis Blanc were all members of the London Lodge of the United Philadelphians". A bloc was formed by the largely French Philadelphians with Garibaldi and his Italian followers. Soon their ranks were swelled by Belgians and Swiss, who then set about organising a new international organisation to replace the International Association. In 1863 Johan Philip-Becker sent out an invitation to a Congress of democratic and republican movements from all the countries of Western Europe. The Congress was held in Brussels in September 1863, prersided over by Pierre Coulery from La Chaux-de-Fonds in Switzerland. It issued a resolution to create an Association Fédérative Universelle de la Démocratie. However this was eclipsed by Garibaldi's trip to London and the attempt to agitate among workers groups and democratic organisations.

The Philadelphians were very active in organising a reception for Garibaldi in London, setting up a special society called La France Libre. Official negotiations with government circles collapsed, but the Philadelphians played a major role in linking up with grassroots organisations. During this agitation they dropped the phrase "République Démocratique et Sociale Universelle", and socialist agitation took second place behind developing stronger relations between French and Italian democrats. No mention was made of Garibaldi's 1860 promise that the International Legion would carry the struggle to their own countries once Italy was liberated. However, the Philadelphians were moving towards mass politics and away from trying to influence government circles, particularly amongst their Belgian and Swiss allies, who had born the brunt of the organising the 1863 Congress in Belgium. Whether the Order of Memphis had set up groups in Geneva and Brussels remains unclear. At this time members of groups of Parisian workers visited London to acquaint themselves with the English Labour Movement. Their approach was much more open and popular than the clandestine methods which the Order of Memphis had preserved from earlier generations. Yet the Philadelphes made a significant contribution to the setting up of the International Workingmen's Association.

The Rite flourished in England from about 1850 with numerous French language lodges. Many ardent republicans became involved (Louis Blanc, Alfred Talandier, Charles Longuet and Giuseppe Garibaldi (honorary member)). In 1871, the fall of the Paris Commune contributed to a decrease in Lodges which continued in 1880 following amnesty offered by the new French Republican government.

In Egypt, the Rite developed quickly under the direction of Brother Solutore Avventure Zola, Grand Hierophant from 1873 until the reign of King Farouk. Jacques Étienne Marconis de Nègre implanted the Rite in America around 1856. This was developed under the energetic Grand Mastery of Harry Seymour in 1861.

In 1881 the two Rites were fused, effective as of 1889. From this moment, the Rite of Memphis-Misraim spread across the world.

Constituted by Marconis de Nègre in 1838, the Rite of Memphis is a variant of the Rite of Misraïm. It takes the Egypto - alchemical mythology and completes it with pieces borrowed from the Templars and chivalry.

The Rite of Memphis attracted personalities in quest of an ideal. It knew a certain success among military Lodges until 1841; the date where it was put to sleep. But, with the dismissal of Louis-Philippe in 1848, the Rite was reactivated.

In England, from about 1850 numerous English Lodges worked the Rite of Memphis in French. They maintained celebrity for having welcomed ardent Republicans (Louis Blanc, Alfred Talandier, Charles Longuet and Giuseppe Garibaldi, (honorary member)). In 1871, the fall of the Paris Commune contributed to a decrease in Lodges that further declined around 1880 following the declaration of amnesty of the new French republican government.

== Sources ==
- Carlton, Howard (2018-08-08). ""Liberty, Equality, Fraternity": 'Egyptian' Masonry and the History of the First International". Nineteenth-Century Contexts. 40 (4): 317–330. doi:10.1080/08905495.2018.1484607. ISSN 0890-5495. S2CID 159530613.
- Jones, Thomas C.; Tombs, Robert (2013), "The French Left in Exile: Quarante-Huitards and Communards in London, 1848–80", in Kelly, Debra; Cornick, Martyn (eds.), A History of the French in London, London: University of London Press, pp. 165–192, ISBN 978-1-905165-86-5, JSTOR j.ctv512xmz.16
- Jones, Thomas C. (September 2010). French Republican Exiles in Britain, 1848–1870 (PhD thesis). University of Cambridge.
- Lause, Mark A. (December 2011). A Secret Society History of the Civil War. Urbana, Illinois: University of Illinois Press. ISBN 978-0-252-09359-3.
