= Simon François Bernard =

French surgeon (1817–1862)

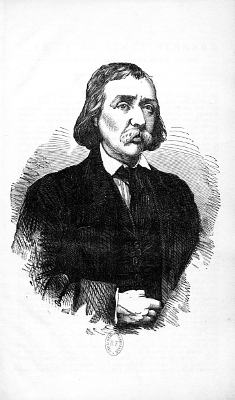
Simon François Bernard, 1858 engraving.

Simon François Bernard (28 January 1817 in Carcassonne, France – 25 November 1862 in London) was a French surgeon and republican revolutionary. He is best known for his involvement in the 1858 plot of Felice Orsini to assassinate Napoleon III.

Bernard was a Fourierist. He was put on trial in England, and the proceedings had a high profile. He was defended by Edwin John James and Henry Hawkins; and was acquitted, sensationally. He had opted for a completely English jury, and his defence council's rhetoric outweighed the summing-up of the judge, which tended towards a conviction. However, Bernard apparently was targeted by a female spy in the employ of the Second Empire, and made the error of revealing his French friends and contacts. These were subsequently rounded up and executed by the French government. Bernard, upon learning this, went insane. He died at the Brook House Lunatic Asylum in Upper Clapham, London on 25 November 1862.

Those who spoke at his funeral were Adolphe Talandier, Gustave Jourdain, Jacob Holyoake and Félix Pyat, all associated with the Philadelphes.
