= Giustiniano Lebano =

Italian lawyer and patriot (1832–1910)

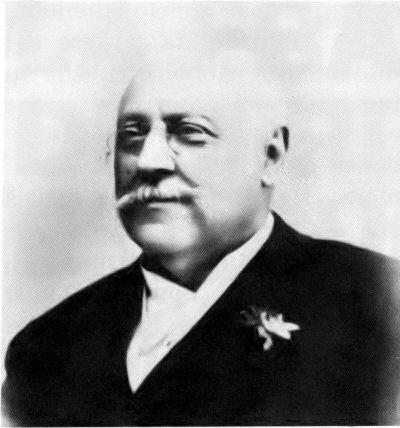
Giustiniano Lebano

Giustiniano Lebano, alias Sairitis Hus, (14 May 1832 – 1910), also known as the "wizard of Torre Annunziata", was an Italian lawyer, patriot, esoterist, alchemist, Freemason, Martinist, Hermeticist, philanthropist, and historian.

== Origins ==
Lebano derives from De lo Olevano or de lo Levano, an ancient noble Spanish family of the princes De los Garavitos. In 1146, they became consuls, and in 1222, they obtained the position, first in Milan and then in the Kingdom of the Two Sicilies, in Salerno. In 1464, the ambassador to the Aragonese court in Naples was Novello de lo Levano. After that, there are no notable records of the family for a couple of centuries, until May 4, 1743, when Andrea Lebano married Baroness Lucia Pinto of Lustra Cilento. From the marriage, Liborio Lebano was born, followed later by Filippo Lebano (1766–1832). Filippo married Maria Giuseppa Monaco, together they had Francesco (1801–1896) and Filippo (1802–1852), the latter of whom became a civil lawyer in 1826.

== Biography ==
Son of lawyer Filippo (1802–1852), a member of the Cilento Carbonari, and Maria Acampora, he studied at the San Carlo alle Mortelle high school in Naples, graduating with a classical diploma in 1847. As a student of Basilio Puoti and Vito Fornari, he studied Literature and Italian, and became a deep scholar of dead languages such as Latin, Greek, and Hebrew, taught to him respectively by Nicola Lucignano, Giuseppe Maria Parascandolo, and Andrea Ferrigni.

He graduated with honors at the age of 17 in Literature and Philosophy on September 21, 1849. He continued his studies focusing on civil, criminal, canon, and international law, as well as natural law. After being authorized to take exams by Canon Francesco Saverio Apuzzo, he earned his law degree in 1852.

He began practicing law in the office of Enrico Castellano and simultaneously started dedicating himself to early works and private teaching of civil and canon law. In July 1854, he was registered with the list of attorneys at the Court of Appeal.

=== Freemasonry ===
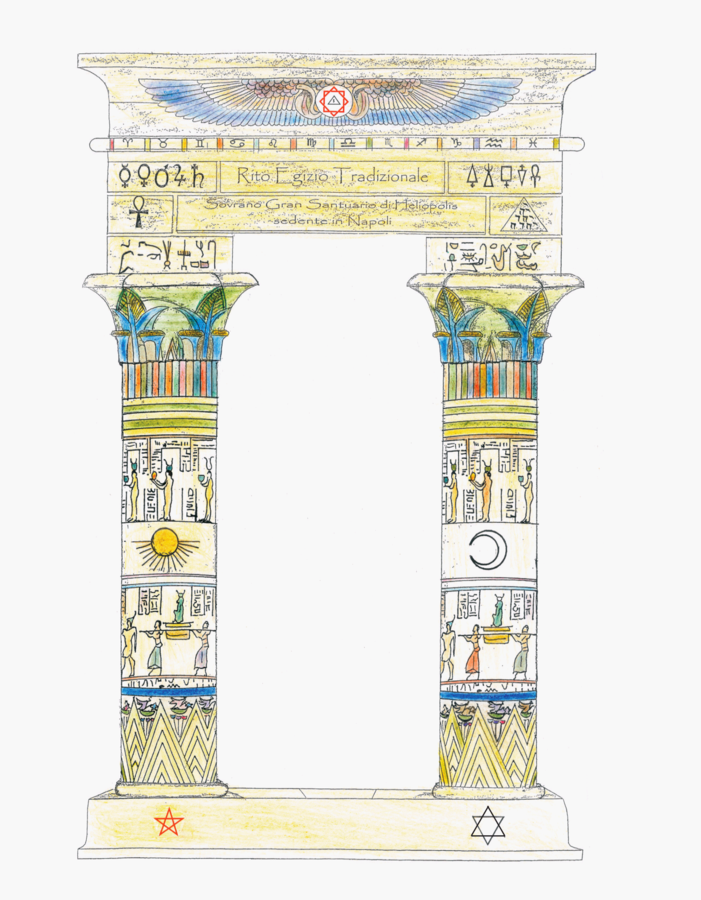
Emblem of the Traditional Egyptian Rite of which Lebano was Grand Master from 1893 to 1910

Domenico Bocchini, heir to the Neapolitan Egyptian Hermetic Tradition of the 18th and 19th centuries, co-founded the Egyptian Osiridean Order with Filippo Lebano. Giustiniano's family's close relationship with Bocchini led to his initiation into the Traditional Egyptian Rite at the Folgore Lodge in 1853, where he later served as Grand Master from 1893 to 1910.

Along with other hermetists such as Giuseppe Ricciardi and Domenico Angherà, he revived the Hermetic tradition of Alexandrian Egyptian origin, giving rise to the Egyptian Grand Orient. In 1873, the archive of the Egyptian Grand Orient was moved to Villa Lebano. He was the first supervisor of the Masonic lodge of the Grand Orient at the Sebezia Lodge and the Grand Master of the secret Christian Hermetic order of the Rosicrucians. As an esotericist, he was the mentor under Giuliano Kremmerz and studied under Eliphas Levi and was a member of the Theosophical Society.

=== Risorgimento ===
Being anti-Bourbon and threatened with death by the brigand Antonio Cozzolino alias Pilone, he was forced into exile first in Turin and then in Paris, where he met Alexandre Dumas with whom, in 1860, he brought weapons and ammunition to the Thousand stationed in Calatafimi. In Paris, he had the opportunity to meet the brothers Bédarride, Nicola Giuseppe Spedalieri, Charles Nodier, and Carlo Pisacane.

=== Marriage with Virginia and private life ===
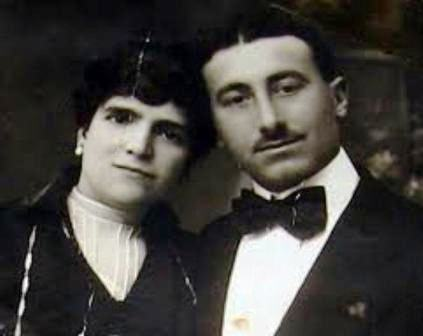
Lebano and his wife Virginia

Lebano married Virginia Bocchini on September 7, 1862, after meeting her in 1859. Virginia was the granddaughter of Domenico Bocchini, who had raised her after she became orphaned. In 1870, the couple moved to Villa Lebano, although Virginia was anxious due to the raids by the brigand Pilone. It was at this villa that two of their four children, a son and a daughter, died, leading Virginia to lose faith in conventional medicine. She began to seek out mediums and occultists, including Eusapia Palladino and Giuliano Kremmerz, and became involved in magic, Kabbalah, and spiritualism. However, in 1883, their fifteen-year-old son, Filippo, fell seriously ill. Desperate to save his life, Virginia consulted doctors, healers, monks, priests, exorcists, astrologers, and gurus. Admitted to the hospital in Torre Annunziata, all forms of infectious disease were ruled out, but the type of enteritis he was suffering from could not be identified. When Filippo was returned home, Virginia, completely discouraged, subjected him to a magical ritual, during which she was severely burned on September 30, 1883. From that point on, she lost her sanity and threatened suicide. Giustiniano Lebano withdrew from public life, practicing law from home. In 1884, their surviving daughter, Silvia, was sent to Sorrento for safety, while Virginia's health began to improve by 1885, so much so that she received a visit from Helena Blavatsky and Franz Hartmann, who came to be initiated into the Arcana Arcanorum by Giustiniano Lebano.

After about three years, Virginia's condition worsened significantly, suffering from epileptic seizures, Alzheimer's, bipolar disorder, and Parkinson's disease. Under the care of her husband, she died in the summer of 1904. Lebano died in 1910.

== The Lebano Fund ==
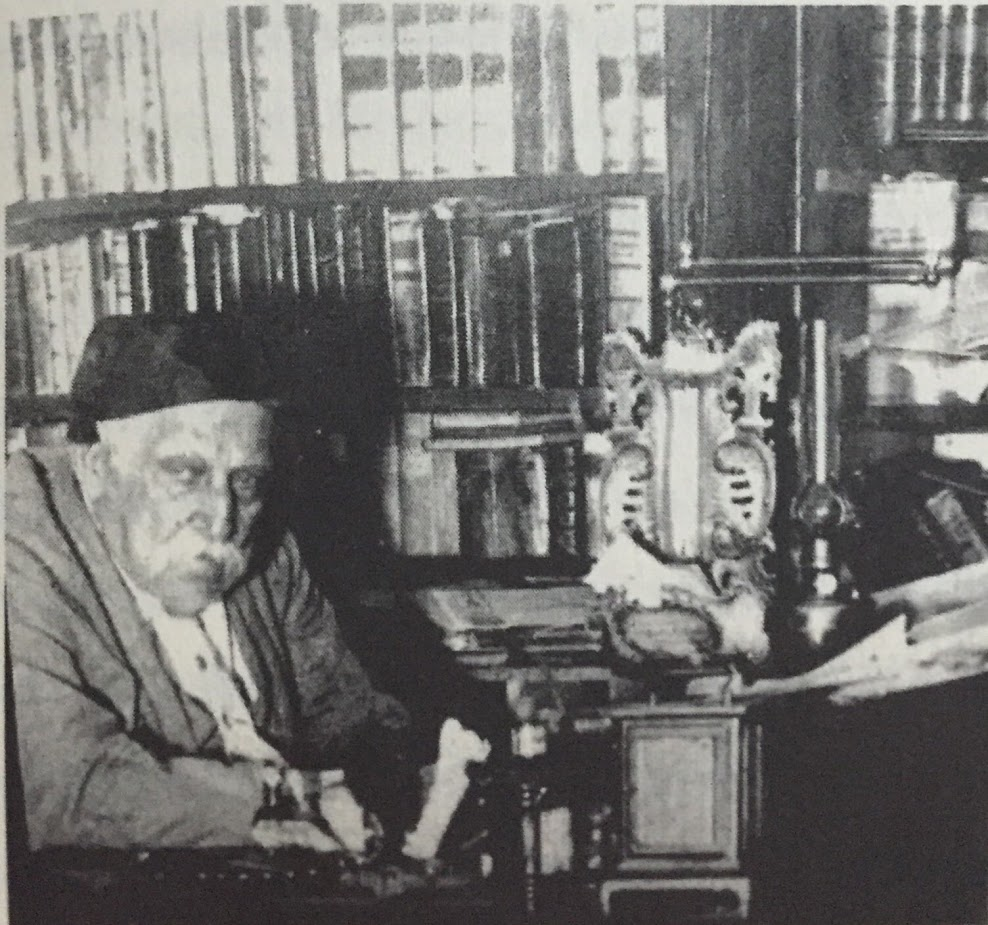
Giustiniano Lebano in his library of Villa Lebano

Thanks to his friendship with many men of letters, Lebano owned a private library consisting of 2,033 very rare manuscripts and over 5,000 rare volumes of Hermetic philosophy. Upon his death in 1910, the collection passed to his daughter, Silvia. With the advent of fascism, in 1925 Pasquale del Pezzo, duke, senator, university rector and former mayor of Naples, made all the works of the Neapolitan Masonic lodges disappear by hiding them in Villa Lebano, thanks to the help of a Navy Marshal, a certain Antonio Ariano. At the end of the Second World War, in 1948 Ariano brought all the documents back to Naples and, thanks to a previous agreement, took custody of a thousand manuscripts and 2,350 volumes from the library of Villa Lebano, handing them over to his wife, Rosaria Valerio di Caserta, an Egyptian theosophist and freemason, who kept them in her home in Caserta, Villa Valerio Landi, until 1975, the year of her death. Subsequently, a certain Nicola Ariano from Torre Annunziata, nephew of Antonio, began searching for the Lebano archive in both villas, but did not find any documents.

== Works ==
- È Dio, o è l'uomo? È il Cholera-Morbus, o l'Ocifon Sincope? (terza ediz. migliorata e corretta dall'autore). Napoli: Tip. Antonio Cons. 1875.
- Del Morbo Oscuro chiamato da Areteo Ocifon – Sincope creduto Colera – Morbus, IV ediz. migliorata e corretta. Napoli: A.Tocco & C. 1884.
- La cantica dei cantici. Torre Annunziata: Stab. Tip. Torrese. 1891.
- Risposta alla sfida fatta dalla gazzetta La Scintilla all'avv. Giustiniano Lebano. Torre Annunziata: Stab. Tip. Torrese. 1895.
- Seconda risposta alla sfida fatta dalla gazzetta La Scintilla all'avv. Giustiniano Lebano. Napoli: Stab. Tip. G. Nobile & Co. 1895.
- Breve risposta dell'avvocato Giustiniano Lebano al rifiuto dei municipii di partecipare alla festa nazionale il 20 settembre in Roma. Torre Annunziata: Stab. Tip. Torrese. 1895.
- Il Cielo Urbico – Cantica sul modello dei Carmi Orfei Omerici e Sibillini, II ediz. Napoli. 1896.
- Il vero della relegazione di Ovidio al Ponto. Napoli: Tip. G. Nobile & Co. tipografi. 1896.
- A Sua Real Maestà Umberto Primo Re d'Italia. In occasione del suo giorno natalizio 14 marzo 1899: Inno Esichio. Torre Annunziata: Stabilimento Tipo Litografico Cromo Enrico Prisco. 1899.
- Del Mistero e della Iniziatura (apparso in due puntate sui fascicoli n. 9 – 10 di settembre ed ottobre 1899 de "Il Mondo Secreto". Napoli: Detken & Rocholl. 1899.
- Dell'Inferno – Cristo vi discese colla sola anima o anche col corpo? Del Giudizio Eumenediaco del Tartaro degli Elisi. Torre Annunziata: Stab. Tip. E. Prisco. 1899.
- "Alla Verità" Inno (tratto dal Cielo Urbico e pubblicato sul fascicolo n. 5 maggio 1899 de "Il Mondo Secreto". Napoli: Detken & Rocholl. 1899.
- Saggio del volgarizzamento della Bibbia (articolo apparso su "L'Irno", n. 39, mercoledì 16 luglio 1902). Salerno. 1902.
- Il Randello. Torre Annunziata: Stab. Tipo-Litografico E. Prisco. 1903.
- Questi versi all'avv. Com. Alessandro Guarracino dedica e consacra. Castellammare di Stabia: Tip. Elzeviriana. 1904.
- L'antica sapienza al cospetto del XX secolo. Castellamare di Stabia: Tip. Stabiana Catello Vollono. 1906.
- La cultura e le scuole prima del mille. Napoli. 1906.
- A Sua Maestà Vittorio Emanuele III Re d'Italia nella ricorrenza del suo natalizio. Castellammare di Stabia: Tip. Stabiana Catello Vollono. 1906.
- Una lacerazione ed emendazione al tema svolto da un ignoto G. R. nel giornaletto "La Luce". La cultura e le scuole prima del mille. Napoli: Stab. Tipografico del Tasso. 1908.
- Risposta del veglio Giustiniano Lebano ad una vile Gazz-&-taglia. 1900.
- Seconda risposta del veglio Giustiniano Lebano ad una ragghiata d'asino di un chercuto serfedocco che a scorbicchierato a ribecco una stompita polledra in un numero unico. 1900.
- Delle Sirene (inedito pubblicato da M. E. Barraco in Giustiniano Lebano e la Scuola di Napoli). Nove. 1999.
- Opere. Forlì: Victrix. 2004–2014.
- La Leggenda di Roma (scritto ripubblicato in "Politica Romana", fasc. 8 (2008–2009), con una introduzione di Elysius). Roma. 2009.
- La Cantica dei Cantici (ristampa). Forlì: Victrix, collana Palladia (vol. II delle Opere di Lebano). 2011.
- Dell'Inferno (ristampa). Forlì: Victrix, collana Palladia, (vol.III delle Opere di Lebano). 2011.
- Del Morbo Oscuro (ristampa). Forlì: Victrix, collana Palladia (vol. IV delle Opere di Lebano). 2012.
- Del mistero e della iniziazione e altri scritti. Victrix Collana: Palladia. 2014.
- Saggio del Volgarizzamento della Bibbia. Il Randello (ristampa). Forlì: Victrix, collana Palladia (vol. V delle Opere di Lebano). 2014.
- Del Mistero e della Iniziatura e altri scritti (ristampa). Forlì: Victrix, collana Palladia (vol. VI delle Opere di Lebano). 2014.
- Domenico Vittorio Ripa Montesano (1911). Ristampa anastatica degli archivi storici del rito egizio tradizionale Sovrano Gran Santuario di Heliopolis sedente in Napoli. Napoli: Edizione Originale Riservata. ISBN 9788894296419.
- Scuola di Napoli Alla Verità (Inno di G. Lebano).
- La Scienza delle Scienze ovvero il decadimento di sedici secoli di Letteratura Europea (2 voll.) 67.
- La Sapienza (2 voll.).
- La stirpe di Virgilio, ove si dimostra che fu romano, non mantovano.
- Il Giobbe.
- La Genesi al cospetto del secolo XIX (2 voll.).
- Una Lacerazione ed emendazione sul vero di Napoli e Palepoli.
- Il Vero della Patria di Omero.

== Bibliography ==
- A cura del Sovrano Gran Hyerophante Generale e Gran Maestro Fratello LOGOS (2017). Rito egizio tradizionale storia riti e miti. Napoli: Edizione riservata. ISBN 9788894296433.
- Avvisati, Carlo (2010). Una camicia rossa a Pompei. Roma: L'Erma di Bretschneider.
- Avvisati, Carlo (2011). Scorribande, vita e morte di Antonio Cozzollino 'o brigante Pilone: legittimista borbonico vesuviano e cavaliere di Francesco 2º. Boscotrecase: Il Gazzettino Vesuviano.
- Barraco, Michele E. (1999). Giustiniano Lebano e la Scuola di Napoli (con aggiunto l'inedito Delle Sirene). Nove: Libreria Editrice "Letture S...consigliate".
- Bramato, Fulvio (1980). Napoli massonica nel Settecento: dalle origini al 1789. Ravenna: Longo.
- Casale, Angelandrea (2015). Un massone alle falde del Vesuvio (1832–1910). Trecase: Youcanprint. ISBN 978-8893210522.
- Cerinotti (a cura di), Angela (2009). La Massoneria. Il vincolo fraterno che gioca con la storia. Prato.
- Ciervo, Marcello (2005). Felice Barilla, Costantino Crisci. Benevento: Moiano: iMusicalia.
- Cirillo, Antonio (2004). Il tesoro di Boscoreale e il suo scopritore: la vera storia ricostruita sui documenti dell'epoca. Pompei: Litografia Sicignano.
- Cisaria, Ugo (2008). L'Ordine egizio e la Myriam di Giuliano Kremmerz – Egizia Fonte Cumana di Piazzetta Nilo. Viareggio: Edizioni Rebis.
- Di Donna, Giuseppe (2010). Giustiniano Lebano, in "La Tòfa". Torre del Greco.
- Di Iorio, Michele (n.d.). Historia dell'Ordine Osirideo Egizio Scala di Napoli, dattiloscritto xerografato. Napoli.
- Di Iorio, Michele (2015). Gli allievi di Giustiniano Lebano, nel sito web "Lo Speaker", 2013; riproposto nel sito "Arcana Sebezio".
- Donato, Riccardo (2012). La chiave della sapienza ermetica secondo Giuliano Kremmerz, Domenico Bocchini, Giustiniano Lebano, vol. I. Viareggio: Edizioni Rebis.
- Elysius (1990). Giustiniano Lebano ed i Misteri Classici Antichi, in "Ignis". Messina: Rivista di studi iniziatici.
- Elysius (1997). La Sapienza Palladia, in "Politica Romana", n. 4. Roma.
- Ripa Montesano, Domenico Vittorio (2011). Raimondo di Sangro Principe di San Severo primo Gran Maestro del rito egizio tradizionale. Napoli: Edizione riservata. ISBN 9788894296402.
- Ripa Montesano, Domenico Vittorio (2016). Origini del rito egizio tradizionale - Quaderni egizi di loggia. Napoli: Edizione riservata. ISBN 9788894296488.
