= Translation movement =

Translation movement may refer to:

- Graeco-Arabic translation movement (8th–10th centuries)
- Arabo-Latin translation movement (12th century)
- Great Translation Movement (since February 2020), in response to the 2022 Russian invasion of Ukraine
