= Jacques-Étienne Marconis de Nègre =

French Freemason

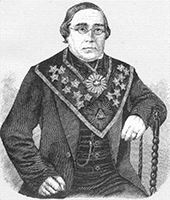

Jacques-Étienne Marconis de Nègre (3 January 1795, Montauban, - 21 November, 1868, Paris) was a French writer and active Freemason.

He was the son of Gabriel-Mathieu Marconis and Marthe Nègre his wife.

== Works ==
- Le Soleil mystique, journal de la maçonnerie universelle, 1853
