= Giuliano Kremmerz =

Italian alchemist (1861–1930)

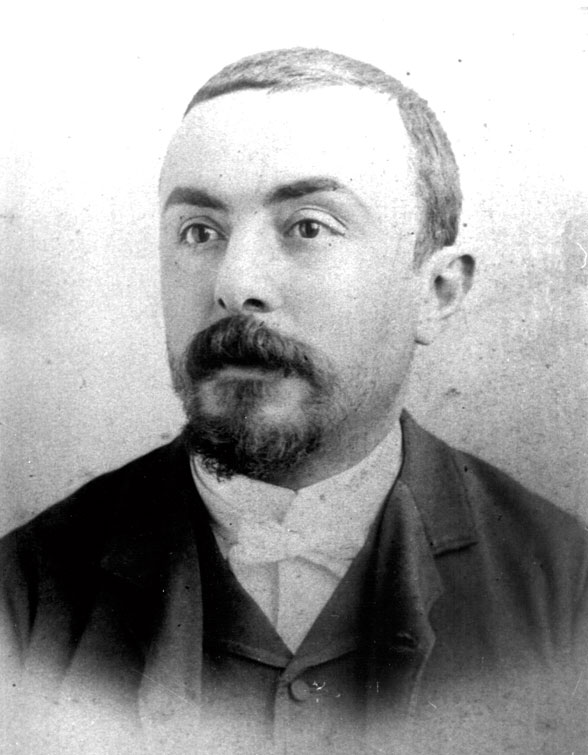
Giuliano Kremmerz

Giuliano M. Kremmerz (1861–1930), born Ciro Formisano, was an Italian alchemist working within the tradition of Hermeticism.

In 1896, Kremmerz founded the Confraternita Terapeutica e Magica di Myriam (Therapeutic and Magic Brotherhood of Myriam).

== Biography ==
Ciro Formisano was born in Portici, near Naples, on 8 April 1861. He was a philosopher, therapeutist and thaumaturgist, and founded the S.P.H.C.I. (Schola Philosophica Hermetica Classica Italica) Fratellanza Terapeutica Magica di Miriam, with exclusively therapeutic aims for the benefit of all, and still in operation today through some filiations that inherited the doctrinal and ritual patrimony of the school.

Ciro Formisano soon made contact with Pasquale De Servis, known to scholars of magical Hermeticism of that time as IZAR and linked to the Italic roots of initiatory tradition – the tradition that, prior to Christianity, had flourished in Magna Graecia in the Pythagorean School, which had taken in the Isiacal and Osirian cults from Egypt.

Virtually buried under the effects of the eruption of Vesuvius in 79 BC, this tradition had later attempted to re-emerge in various forms, disguised in the works and thoughts of some of the greatest names in culture and medicine, such as Dante and the Fedeli d'Amore (Brotherhood of the Faithful in Love), Cecco D'Ascoli, Pico della Mirandola, Marsilio Ficino (Marsilius Ficinus), Giordano Bruno, Heinrich Cornelius Agrippa, and Paracelsus, all the way through to Raimondo di Sangro, Prince of Sansevero, and to the Count of Cagliostro in the eighteenth century and, in more recent times, to the esoteric currents in the Italian Risorgimento.

On the basis of what Kremmerz himself states, it was De Servis who initiated the young Ciro Formisano to the mysteries of the Sacred Science, recognising in him the constituent characteristics of a master of Hermeticism, combined with a great humanitarian, tolerant and generous nature.

Ciro Formisano graduated in the Humanities and, after a brief experience as a teacher and then as a journalist, he departed on a mysterious voyage to Montevideo, where it is said he made contact with the shamanic cultures of Latin America.

It is not impossible that the idea of Formisano's journey had come from De Servis (Izar) himself for, protected by his anonymity, he controlled much of the Italic and neo-Egyptian Hermetic initiatory tradition of that time.

In 1887, when he had adopted the pseudonym of Giuliano Kremmerz, Ciro Formisano started to write about elements of natural and divine magic through the journal Il Mondo Secreto. At the same time, he started up the SPHCI, binding it to therapeutic ends carried out by means of "distance medicine" for the sick. The form and substance he outlined for the Schola has remained unchanged to this day and has statutory form in the 60 paragraphs of the Pragmatica Fondamentale of the S.P.H.C.I Fratellanza Terapeutica Magica di Miriam.

The works of Kremmerz laid the foundations for carrying the initiatory tradition into the new millennium, taking it back to the archetype—which, over the centuries, had become confused—of the feminine form of the mystery tradition. It was on this archetype that he modelled the Schola, introducing instructions and practices designed to train disciples in the exercise of selfless good and to develop latent powers within them.

It must also be said that Kremmerz's work of promulgation came up against a number of obstacles, some of which came from the esoteric world itself, from areas still bound by a conservative and elitist vision of ancient wisdom and its transmission.

== Thought and word ==
The basis of the philosophical ideas of Giuliano Kremmerz is "sacred materialism", which should not be confused with the depreciatory meaning given to the word "materialism" by economic doctrines or by certain interpretations in the philosophy of science.

Kremmerz's "sacred materialism" is based on the idea of the unity of all that exists, meaning there can be no separation between spirit and matter. On the contrary, it is precisely towards the full integration of the two apparently opposite poles (i.e. intelligent origin and material manifestation) that the evolutionary path of man is directed. This integration is conscious and, especially, concrete in terms of the effects it can have on the living matter of the human being. It is the ultimate goal of hermetic philosophy and of the practices it aims to accomplish. It is also the goal of the Schola founded by Kremmerz.

The achievement of this goal is symbolised as "matriarchy", in which the term is not used in its more usual social meaning. "Matriarchy" comes from the union of two words "meter" or "mother"/"matrix" (same root as "matter") and "arché" or "commencement"/"origin"/"substance".

Within the vision of the unity of existence as proposed by Kremmerz, the dualism of spirit and matter has no reason to exist. Kremmerz states that "hermetic reality" is to be found in the balance between free intelligence and the sensitivity of the organism, and that the predominance of one or the other always leads to a state of imbalance that deviates from fundamental unity. In the equilibrium of the hermetic vision, the creative idea (intelligent spirit) cannot do without the substance (matter) through which it takes form.
