= Roman Traditional Movement =

Italian neopagan organisation (1988-)

- Movimento Tradizionale Romano
- Abbreviation: MTR
- Formation: 1988; 38 years ago
- Type: Religious organisation
- Purpose: Roman-Italic neopaganism
- Leader: Daniele Liotta
- Website: https://www.saturniatellus.com/

The Roman Traditional Movement (Italian: Movimento Tradizionale Romano, abbreviated MTR) is a Roman-Italic neopagan organisation in Italy. It was founded in 1988 as a unification of several existing groups. Among the founders were Salvatore Ruta, Renato Del Ponte and Roberto Incardona.

== History ==
The Roman Traditional Movement was created in 1988, following an effort in the 1980s to unify different strands of Roman Neopaganism in Italy. A part of the background was a return to the religious roots of the Traditionalism of Julius Evola, represented by the Gruppo di Dioscuri and its successor Arx in Messina, but without the politics otherwise associated with Evola in the post-war period. Arx joined forces with the unrelated groups Centro Studi "Claudio Flavio Giuliano", the Istituto Siciliano di Studi Tradizionali and the Centro Studi "Giorgio Gemisto Pletone" to hold three meetings from 1985 to 1988, which resulted in the creation of a common organisation. Some of the key people involved were the religious writer and former Italian Social Movement politician Salvatore Ruta, the historian Renato Del Ponte and the researcher Roberto Incardona. The original name was the Roman Traditionalist Movement (Italian: Movimento Tradizionalista Romano), which was shortened to the current name in 1998, following some defections and a reorganisation.

== Activity ==
The Roman Traditional Movement practices and works to support and spread what it calls the Roman Way to the Gods (Italian: Via Romana agli Dei), Roman-Italic religion (Italian: Religione Romano-Italica) or Gentile Roman religion. It publishes the magazine La Cittadella and organises meetings and conferences. In 2005 it became a member of the European Congress of Ethnic Religions.

== See also ==
- UR Group
- Neopaganism in Italy
- Reconstructionist Roman religion
- Natale di Roma
- Pietas Comunità Gentile
