= Religion in Rome =

Overview of the religion share in Rome

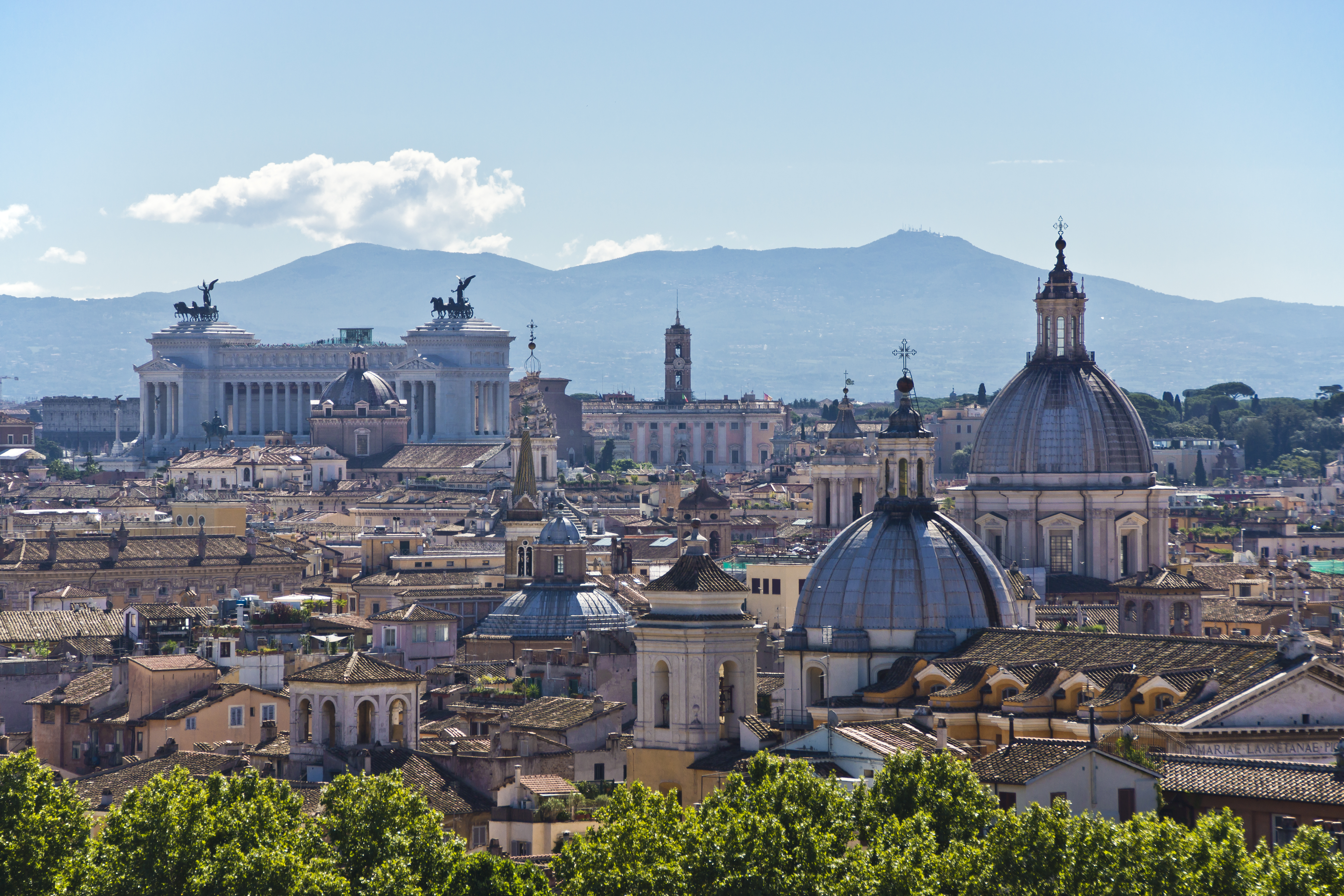
Vittoriano from Castel Sant'Angelo

Religion in Rome (2015)
1. Catholicism (82.0%)
2. Other or non-religious (8.70%)
3. Eastern Orthodoxy (4.00%)
4. Protestant (0.80%)
5. Judaism (0.70%)
6. Islam (3.80%)

Rome has, for more than two millennia, been an important worldwide center for religion, particularly the Catholic strain of Christianity. The city is commonly regarded as the "home of the Catholic Church", owing to the ecclesiastical doctrine of the primacy of the Bishop of Rome. Today, there are also other Abrahamic religions common in Rome, including Judaism and Islam.

== Classical period ==
The Religio Romana (literally, the "Roman Religion") constituted the major religion of the city in antiquity. The first gods held sacred by the Romans were Jupiter, the highest, and Mars, the god of war, and father of Rome's twin founders, Romulus and Remus, according to tradition. The goddess Vesta became an important part of the Roman Pantheon at an early stage of the Roman Monarchy. The goddess Diana joined the Roman Pantheon during the Monarchy times as the central goddess uniting worship between Rome and several of its neighbors, thus creating the basis for a coalition. The goddess Juno was imported to Rome from the ancient city of Veii, after Veii fell to the Roman military, following a long period of wars between the two cities, during the time of the Roman Republic. Other gods and goddesses were honored in Rome and added to the Pantheon throughout the Monarchy and Republic periods. See Livy, Books 1–5.

The Roman religion was largely concerned with interpreting divine messages (auguries) through natural occurrences (omens). However, Rome had no augurs of its own and largely relied upon Etruscan augurs to interpret the divine omens. For this reason, Rome was left without any augurs during its last war with Veii, an Etruscan city, and was forced to send envoys all the way to Greece, to consult the famous Oracle at Delphi. Livy, Book 5.

Several other religions and imported mystery cults remained represented within its ever-expanding boundaries during the Roman Republic and Empire periods, including Judaism, whose presence in the city dates back from the Roman Republic and was sometimes forcibly confined to the Roman Ghetto, as well as Mithraism, until being superseded by Christianity, following the death of Emperor Constantine in the 4th century. Christianity was made the official religion of the Roman Empire in 380 AD by Emperor Theodosius I, allowing it to spread further and eventually wholly replace Mithraism in the Roman Empire.

== Christianity ==
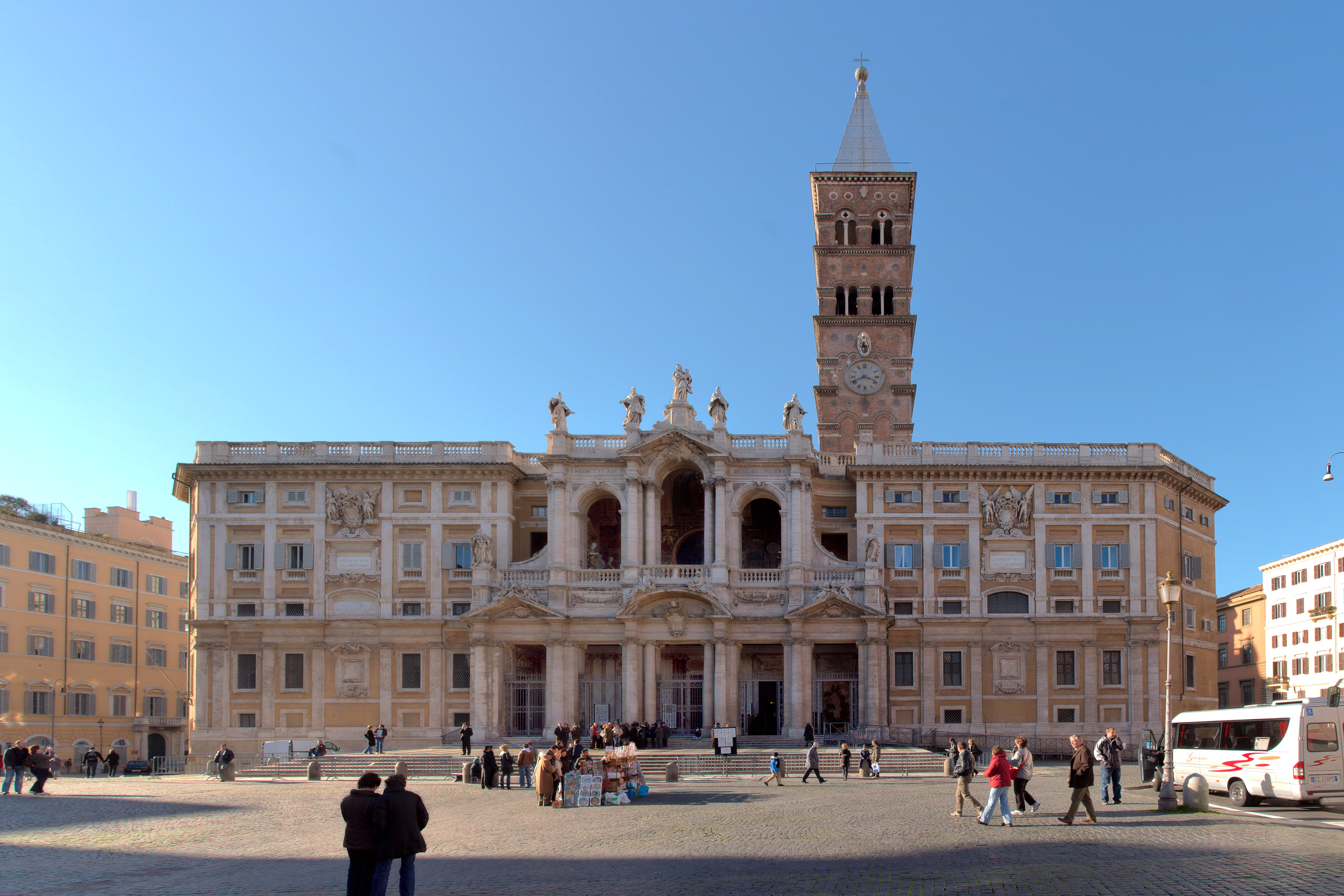
The Basilica di Santa Maria Maggiore, one of the city's earliest basilicas.

Rome became the pre-eminent Christian city (vis-a-vis Antioch and Alexandria, and later Constantinople and Jerusalem) because of the final residence and martyrdom of Saint Peter there during the 1st century, coupled with the city's political importance. The Bishop of Rome, who is traditionally called Pope, claims primacy over all Bishops and therefore all Christians because he is the successor to Saint Peter, upon whom Christ Jesus built His Church; the pope's prestige had been enhanced since 313 through donations by Roman emperors and patricians, including the Lateran Palace and patriarchal basilicas, as well as the obviously growing influence of the Church over the failing civil imperial authority. Papal authority has been exercised by Peter and his successors since the Church's inception, from time to time exposing and resolving divisions among Christians.

With the increasing chaos and disorder leading to the collapse of the Roman Empire in 476, the popes assumed more and more civil authority first in Rome and in the surrounding territories. Rome became the center of the Catholic Church and the capital city of the Papal States; consequently, a great number of churches, convents, and other religious buildings were erected in the city, sometimes on the ruins of older pre-Christian sites of worship. Churches proliferated during the Renaissance, when Rome's most notable churches were built (this includes St. Peter's basilica on the Vatican Hill (the largest church in the world) and the city cathedral of St. John at the Lateran. The Papacy established its residence first in the Lateran Palace, then in the Quirinal Palace. When Rome was annexed by force to the newly unified Kingdom of Italy in 1870, Pope Pius IX retired to the Vatican, proclaiming himself a prisoner of the Savoy monarchy and leading to decades of conflict between the neonate state and the Catholic Church. This was resolved in 1929 when the Lateran Treaty was signed in Rome, establishing the right for the Holy See to govern the Vatican City as an independent, sovereign state. The patron saints of Rome remain Saint Peter and Saint Paul (or, as they are collectively referred to in this context, "the holiest Saints Peter and Paul"), both celebrated on June 29.

=== Vatican City ===
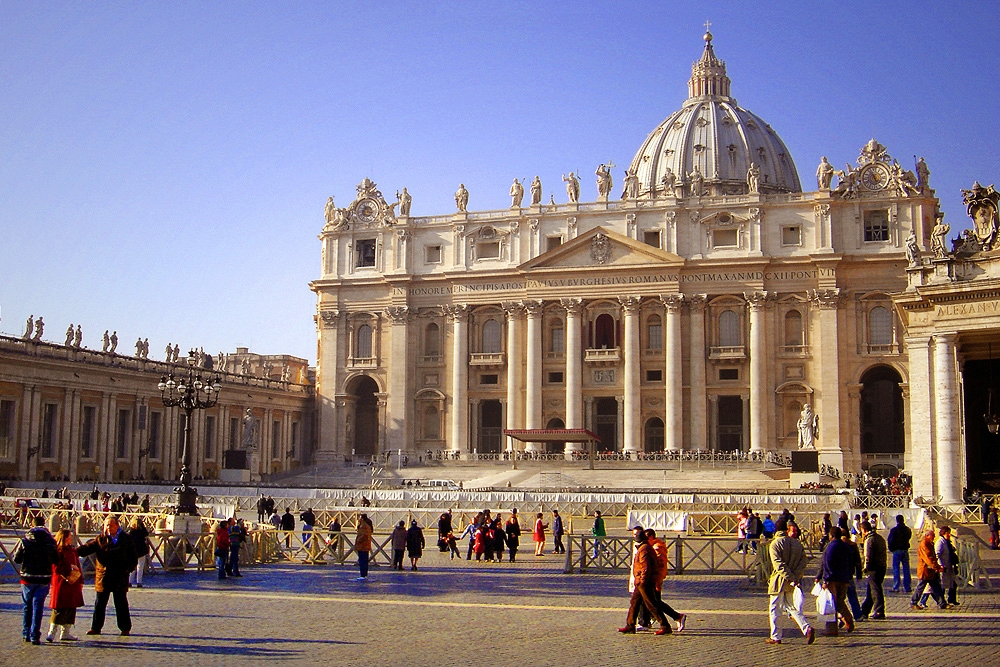
St. Peter's Square and the Basilica.

The city of Rome surrounds the Vatican City, the enclave of the Holy See, which is a separate sovereign state. It hosts Saint Peter's Square with the Saint Peter's Basilica. The open space before the basilica was redesigned by Gian Lorenzo Bernini, from 1656 to 1667, under the direction of Pope Alexander VII, as an appropriate forecourt, designed "so that the greatest number of people could see the Pope give his blessing, either from the middle of the façade of the church or from a window in the Vatican Palace" (Norwich, 1975, p.175). In Vatican City there are also the prestigious Vatican Library, Vatican Museums with the Sistine Chapel, the Raphael Rooms and other important works of Leonardo da Vinci, Raphael, Giotto, and Botticelli.

== Judaism ==
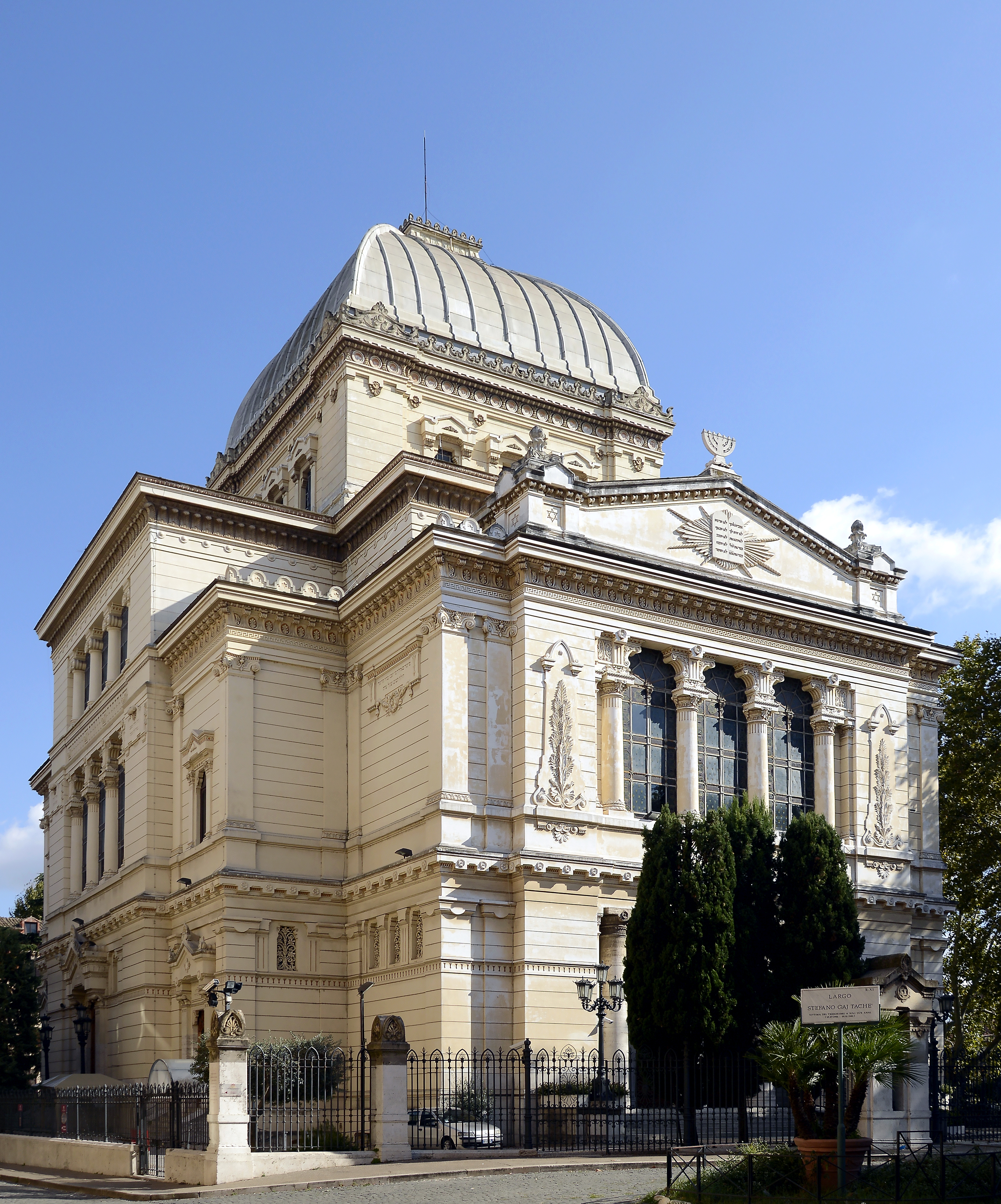
Great Synagogue of Rome.

Judaism has been present in Rome since classical antiquity and Rome is the only city in Europe that has had a constant presence of Jews since the establishment of the Roman Empire.

== Islam ==
In recent years, the Islamic community has grown significantly, in great part due to immigration from North African and Middle Eastern countries into the city. As a result of this trend, the comune promoted the building of the largest mosque in Europe, which was designed by architect Paolo Portoghesi and inaugurated on June 21, 1995.

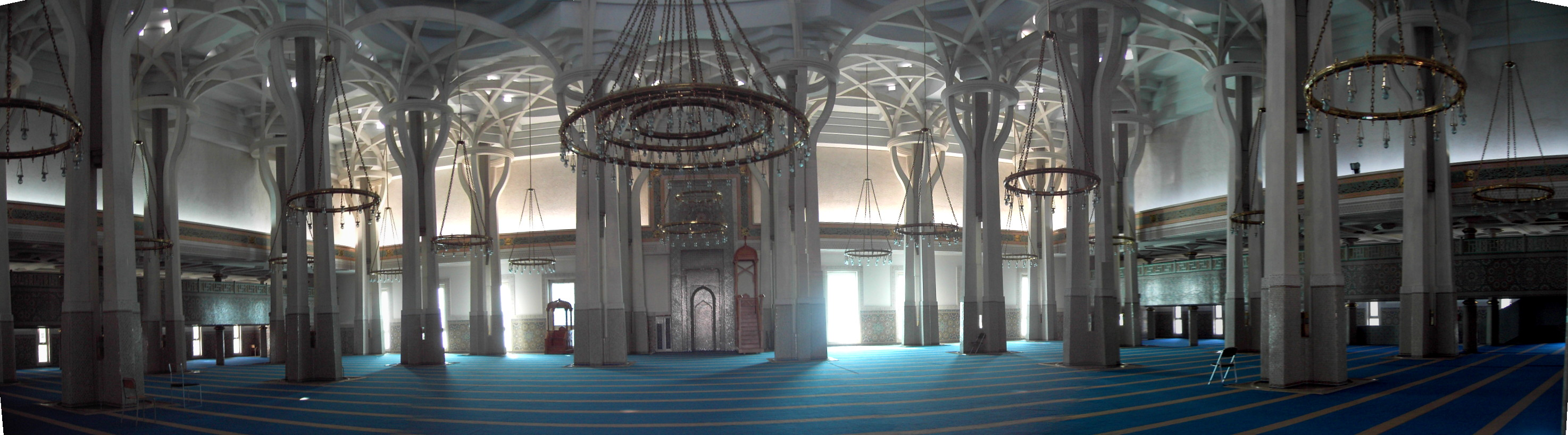
Central mosque by Paolo Portoghesi, Rome (1974)

== Other religions ==
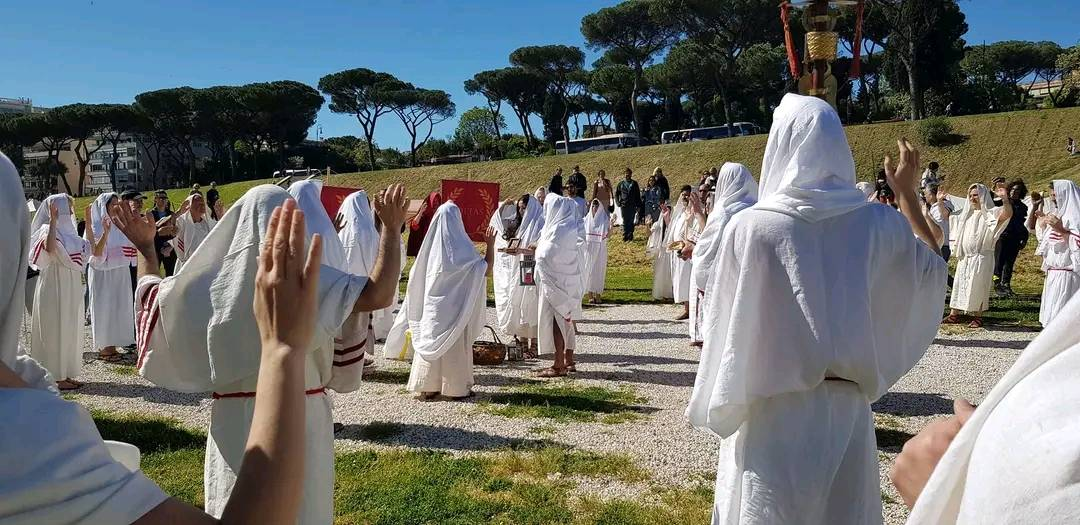
Celebration of the 2777th Natale di Roma at the Circus Maximus

In addition Rome hosts multiple Buddhist temples, a Taoist temple and a variety of Roman modern pagan temples held by the Pietas Comunità Gentile which every year takes part in the religious festivities of a Natale di Roma, an annual festival held in Rome on April 21 to celebrate the legendary founding of the city. According to legend, Romulus is said to have founded the city of Rome on April 21, 753 BC. A Roman chronology derived its system, known by the Latin phrase Ab urbe condita, meaning 'from the founding of the City', from this date and counted the years from this presumed foundation. The dominant method of identifying years in Roman times, though, was to name the two consuls who held office that year. It was celebrated for the first time in 47 AD.
