= Academia Romana =

Academia Romana may refer to:

- Academia Romana (Italy), an Italian academy established in the 15th century by Julius Pomponius Laetus
- Romanian Academy, known in Romanian as Academia Română, a cultural forum founded in 1866, covering the scientific, artistic and literary domains
