= Graeco-Roman paganism =

Graeco-Roman paganism may refer to:

- Paganism, the polytheistic practices of the Roman Empire before Christianization
- Ancient Roman religion
- Ancient Greek religion
- Hellenism (modern religion)
- Roman Polytheistic Reconstructionism
