= Nova Roma (organization) =

Roman revivalist and reconstructionist organization

- Senatus Populusque Novus Romanus
- The flag of Nova Roma, based on the colours and symbols of the Roman Republic
- Formation: 1998; 28 years ago
- Type: Nonprofit
- Official language: Latin
- Website: www.novaroma.org

Nova Roma (English: New Rome) is an international Roman reconstructionist, cultural revivalist, and educational nonprofit organization formed in 1998, later incorporated in Maine. Nova Roma is dedicated to promoting "the restoration of classical Roman religion, culture, and virtues" and "shared Roman ideals".

Notable for providing extensive resources about Roman culture, Latin, ancient Roman costuming and reenactment, Nova Roma aims to be more than a community of reenactors or history study group. Based on the reconstructed Roman ceremonies and spiritual aspects of the activities of Nova Roma, Strimska, Davy, Adler, Gallagher-Ashcraft, and Chryssides have noted its importance to Roman reconstructionism. Because it has a structure based on the ancient Roman Republic, with a senate, magistrates, laws enacted by vote of the comitia, its own coinage, and its self-identity as a "sovereign nation", some outside observers classify it as a micronation.

== Revival of Roman identity and traditions ==
The most important goal of Nova Roma is to provide a living community for Roman reenactors, scholars and fans of ancient Rome, and to all varieties of people who self-identify as Romans in the present day modern world, and to revive those traditions through which an authentic Roman identity can be experienced and expressed. Since one of the most authentic and traditional forms of cultural self-expression for Romans was the celebration of various festivals, rites and ceremonies, Nova Roma has adopted the ancient Roman religion as its "state religion", while also guaranteeing the freedom of religion of its citizens. The British scholar Michael York noted that the traditional Roman way of thinking, Roman philosophy, provides the moral code for Nova Romans.

Both the domestic traditions and the so-called sacra publica are reconstructed by Nova Roma as authentically as possible, including the restoration of the ancient priestly collegia, like the offices of pontifex and flamen, and the honoring of the full cycle of Roman holidays throughout the year. According to the Ontario Consultants on Religious Tolerance, at the time of Christmas, Nova Romans celebrate the Roman holiday Saturnalia.

In 2006, Margot Adler noted the organization's plan to restore a Magna Mater shrine in Rome.

== Live events, conventions and reenactments ==
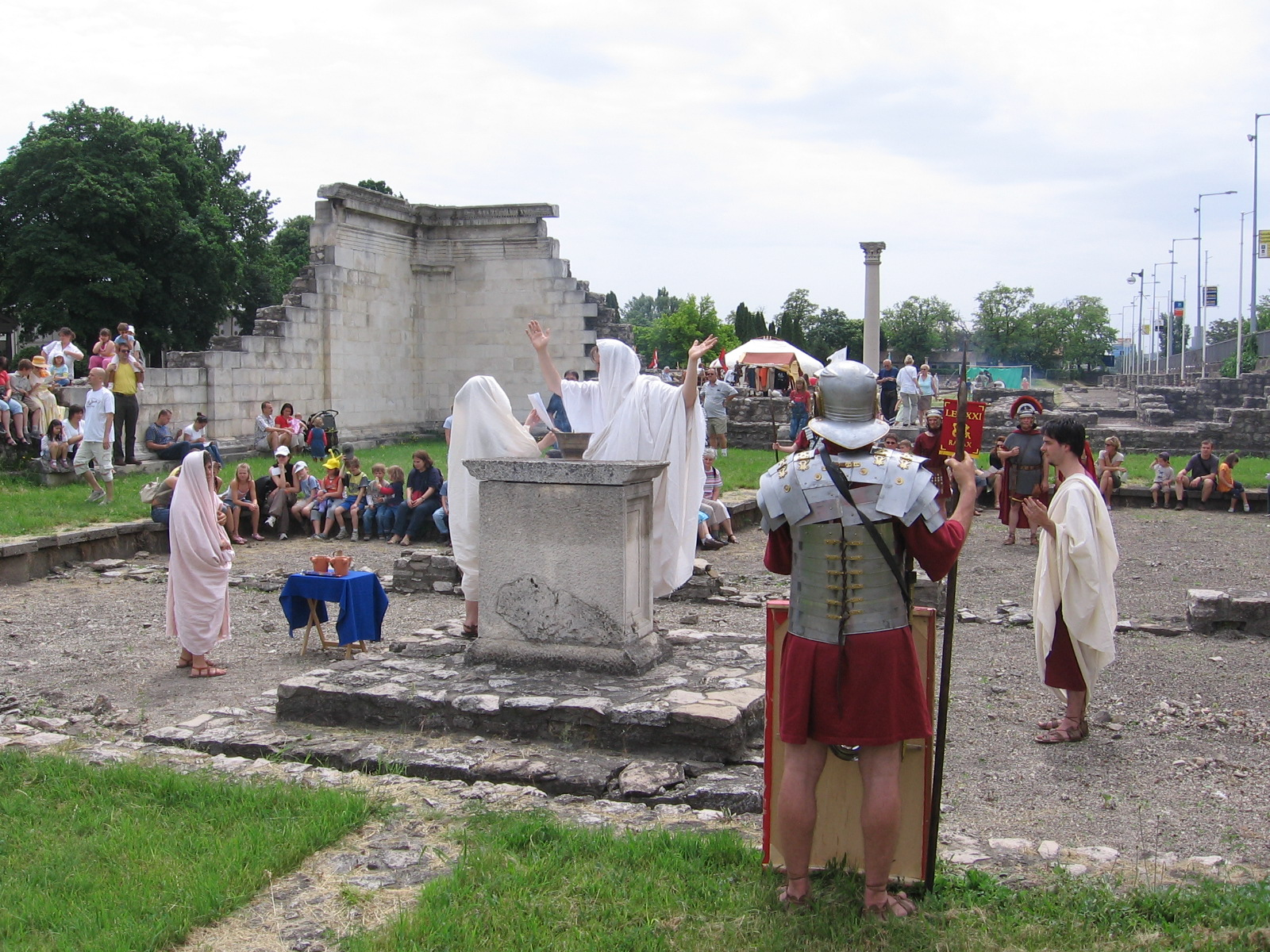
Nova Romans performing a Roman ceremony in Aquincum (Budapest), 2008

Nova Roma holds its own local and international conventions and regularly participates with its affiliated reenactment groups in such history festivals and public events as the Festival of Ancient Heritage in Svishtov, Bulgaria, the Roman Market Day in Wells, Maine's Harbor Park, and Forum Fulvii in Italy, Ludi Savarienses Historical Carnival, the Aquincum Floralia Spring Festival in Budapest, Hungary, or the Natale di Roma (a festival linked to the foundation of Rome) in Rome, Italy, where Nova Roma celebrated its twentieth anniversary.

== Cultural competitions and games ==
Among the cultural activities of Nova Roma, competitions and games associated with various Roman festivals have an important place. They can include a wide range of various programs from humorous online games up to serious art-competitions like the Certamen Petronianum, a literary contest of historical novel writing first held in 2005, where the jury was composed of notables including Colleen McCullough, author of many Roman-themed best-selling novels, and T. P. Wiseman, university professor of Roman history and former vice-president of the British Academy, or the second edition of the same competition, where the jury was Jo Walton, World Fantasy Award-winning novelist and poet.

== Coinage and sponsorship of Roman cultural projects ==
Nova Roma has minted two coins with the denomination of sestertius, one in bronze, issued in 2000, and another in brass, dating from 2005. Each bears the letters SPQR and has a diameter of 32 mm, a thickness of 1.8 mm. These sesterces are convertible into 50 US cents, if sent back to the treasury of the organization, thus they can be used in place of real currency between members of the community.

Regarding the monetary policies of Nova Roma, as a nonprofit organization, its treasury is dedicated to sponsor various Roman cultural projects, including experimental archaeology initiatives, reenactment events, or building Roman temple reconstructions, altars or other reconstructed accessories or any items from the ancient Roman period.

== Global chapters and subsidiaries ==
The international governance of Nova Roma permits the Nova Roman communities of each country to create their national subdivision of Nova Roma, called provincia, and to form their own not-for-profit or incorporated organizations, established under the respective legislation of their local country. This enables better local recognition and management, as well as provides the means for legal and insurance coverage, such as that offered by the Australasian Living History Federation (ALHF).

== Historical contexts ==
Revival of things Roman and their co-option for symbolic importance have a long history. Nova Roma (Latin for 'New Rome') in its deliberate revival of grandiose remnants of the past thus parallels and echoes other New Romes such as:

- the Byzantine or Eastern Roman Empire as a surviving embodiment of Roman ideals based on Constantinople (sometimes characterized as "New Rome" or the "Second Rome") after the decline of the Western Roman Empire;
- the doctrine of the Third Rome as justification for imperial Muscovite and Russian ambitions from the 15th century onwards;
- Mussolini's attempted construction of a Mediterranean-based New Roman Empire (compare Imperial Italy) in the early 20th century.

== See also ==
- Mos maiorum
- Romanitas
- Classical reenactment
- Roman polytheistic reconstructionism
- Pan-Latinism
