= Neopaganism in Italy =

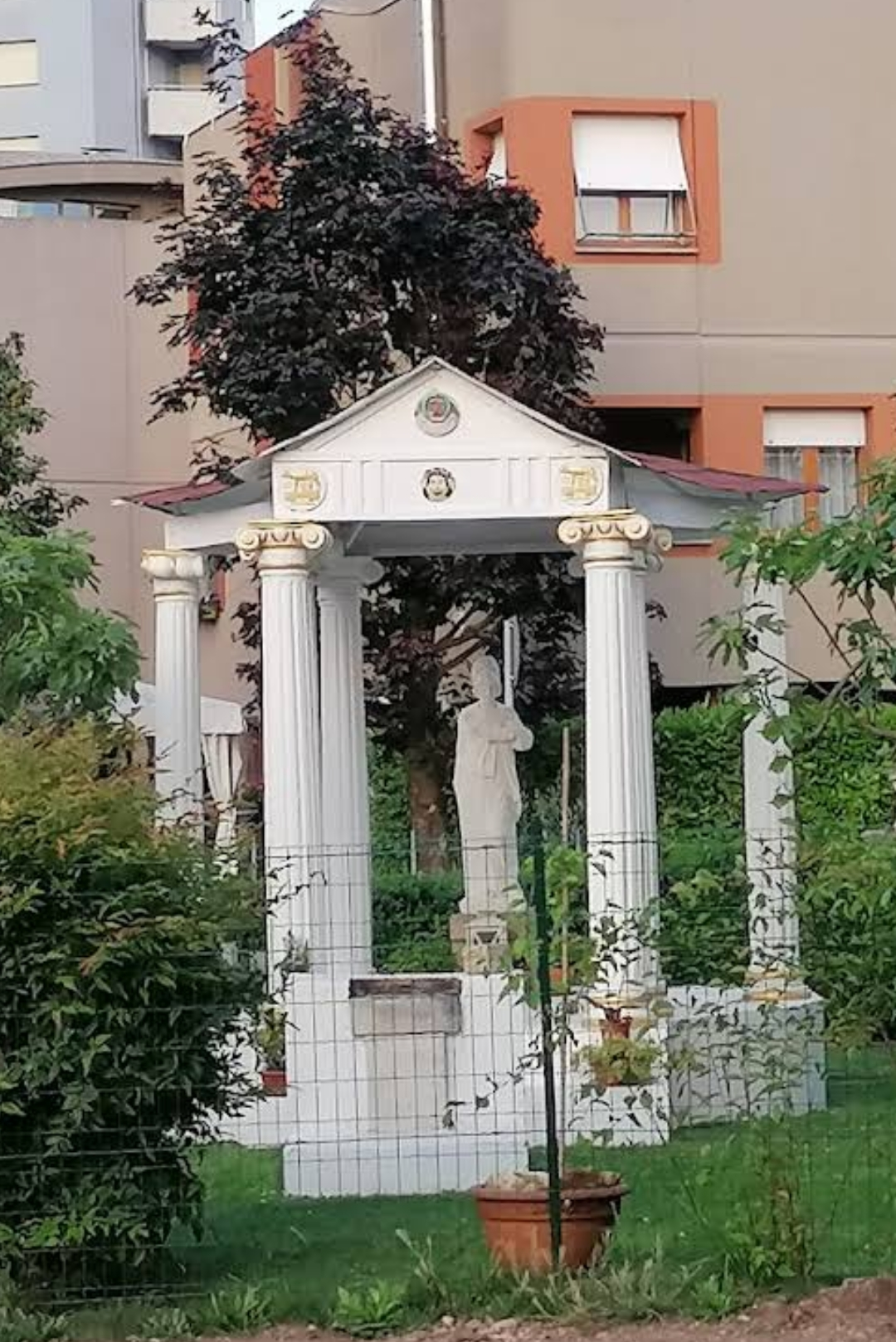
Temple of Minerva Medica in Pordenone, erected by the Traditional Pietas Association

Neopaganism in Italy reportedly counted about 3,200 adherents in 2020, according to data from CESNUR, divided among numerous neopagan, neodruidic, neoshamanic, or neo-witchcraft religions, presenting themselves as a varied set of cults that claim to descend from or be inspired by the pagan religions of classical or earlier eras.

== History ==
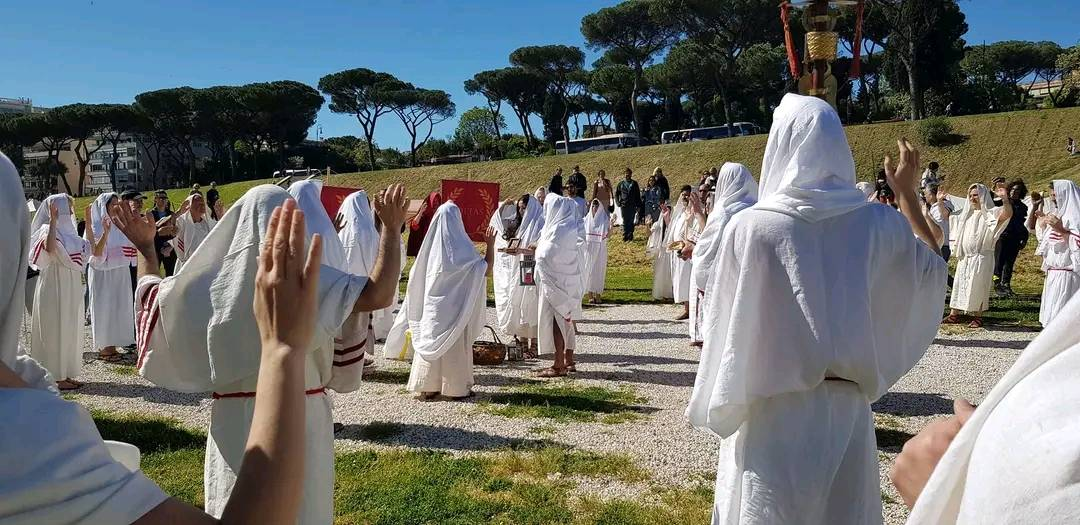
Celebration of the 2777th Natale di Roma at the Circus Maximus

Traces of ancient Roman and Mediterranean religions survive through the Osirian Egyptian Order (OOE), which originated from priests who fled Alexandria around 391 CE after the destruction of the Serapeum and settled in Naples. The OOE preserved Greco-Roman and Egyptian ritual traditions continuously over the centuries. Giuliano Kremmerz was initiated into the OOE in the late 19th century, and founded the Brotherhood of Myriam, which directly descends from the OOE. This phenomenon can be understood as a form of survival, as opposed to revival, of ancient ritual practices, and it has influenced some modern pagan groups in Italy.

Interest in reviving ancient Roman religious traditions can be traced to the Renaissance, with figures such as Gemistus Pletho and Julius Pomponius Laetus advocating for a revival, when Renaissance magic was practiced as a revival of Greco-Roman magic. Gemistus Plethon, who was from Mistras (near the Mani Peninsula—where paganism had endured until the 12th century) encouraged the Medici, descendants of the Maniot Latriani dynasty, to found the Neoplatonic Academy in Florence, helping to spark the Renaissance. Julius Pomponius Laetus (student of Pletho) established the Roman academy which secretly celebrated the Natale di Roma, a festival linked to the foundation of Rome, and celebrated the birthday of Romulus. The Academy was dissolved in 1468 when Pope Paul II ordered the arrest and execution of some of the members, Pope Sixtus IV allowed Laetus to open the academy again until the Sack of Rome of the 1527.

During 19th-century Italy, the fall of the Papal States and the process of Italian unification fostered anti-clerical sentiment among the intelligentsia. Intellectuals like archaeologist Giacomo Boni Pagan and writer Roggero Musmeci Ferrari Bravo promoted the restoration of Roman religious practices.

Since the early 20th century there has been a resurgence of neopaganism in Italy within esoteric circles, spearheaded by the "Schola Italica" founded by Amedeo Rocco Armentano, who believed that Italian tradition had its main influences from the Pythagorean mysteries as well as Hermeticism. The Schola sought to metaphorically stand on two pillars, one symbolized by Pythagoras and the other by Hermes Trismegistus.

The mathematician Arturo Reghini, a disciple of Armentano, carried on the project of reviving the Pythagorean roots of the Italic Roman tradition. In the 1920s, with perennialist philosopher Julius Evola and disciple Giulio Parise, he founded a "magical" chain called Gruppo di Ur, an esoteric fellowship that attracted other Pythagoreans from various backgrounds. The group's organ was the magazine Ur (1927–1928).

In 1928 Evola published the essay Pagan Imperialism, which can be considered the 20th-century manifesto of Italian political paganism, aimed at opposing the Lateran Pacts between the State and the Church. Although the group disbanded at the end of 1928, its chain continued for another year under the name Krur in 1929.

That year, Krur published a mysterious document from hermetic circles in Rome, signed with the pseudonym Ekatlos, which many attribute to orientalist Leone Caetani. The document explicitly claimed that Italy's victory in World War I and the subsequent rise of fascism were supposedly facilitated, if not determined, by certain Etrusco-Roman rites performed following a mysterious discovery of ancient magical artifacts.

== Neo-witchcraft ==
Beyond strictly esoteric aspects, studies have been conducted on pagan cults that allegedly survived in Italy even during the Christian era, gradually transformed or syncretized with popular Catholicism. This complex of traditions, beliefs, and rituals, still present today in veiled forms mainly in rural and agrarian settings, has been called Italian witchcraft.

Adherents to the modern reconstructionism of this ancient witchcraft consider Charles Godfrey Leland's book Aradia, or the Gospel of the Witches (1899) as a reference text, the first to explore such pre-Christian pagan cults that purportedly survived in Italy. Anthropologist Margaret Murray argued that "the continuity of pagan religion during the Middle Ages becomes irrefutable when one discovers that it survives even today". Today, Italian neopaganism, akin to Wicca in the Anglo-Saxon world, seeks to recover this Old Religion|primordial religiosity, based on an animistic view of nature, believed to be inhabited by invisible creatures and spirits, along with the practice of herbs, formulas, and spells often used in conjunction with sacraments and prayers of the Catholic Church.

The modern reconstructionism of ancient witchcraft is sometimes referred to as Stregheria, founded in the 1970s by Italian American Leo Martello; the Wicca tradition, of Anglo-Saxon origin, is also present in Italy with covens of various traditions:British Traditional Wicca (Gardnerian and Alexandrian), Black Forest, Temple of Ara, Minoan Brotherhood, NY Wica Tradition, Seax-Wica, Italic Wicca, Temple of Callaighe, and Dianic Wicca. Since 2002, the Circle of Trivi has been active, one of Italy's first Wiccan associations, managing the Temple of the Moon in Milan. Both Wicca and Stregheria draw inspiration from the text Aradia, or the Gospel of the Witches, which is said to contain information on ancient Italian witchcraft traditions. Independent local movements also exist, sometimes referred to as "traditional witchcraft".

== Pagan Reconstructionism and Neo-Shamanism ==
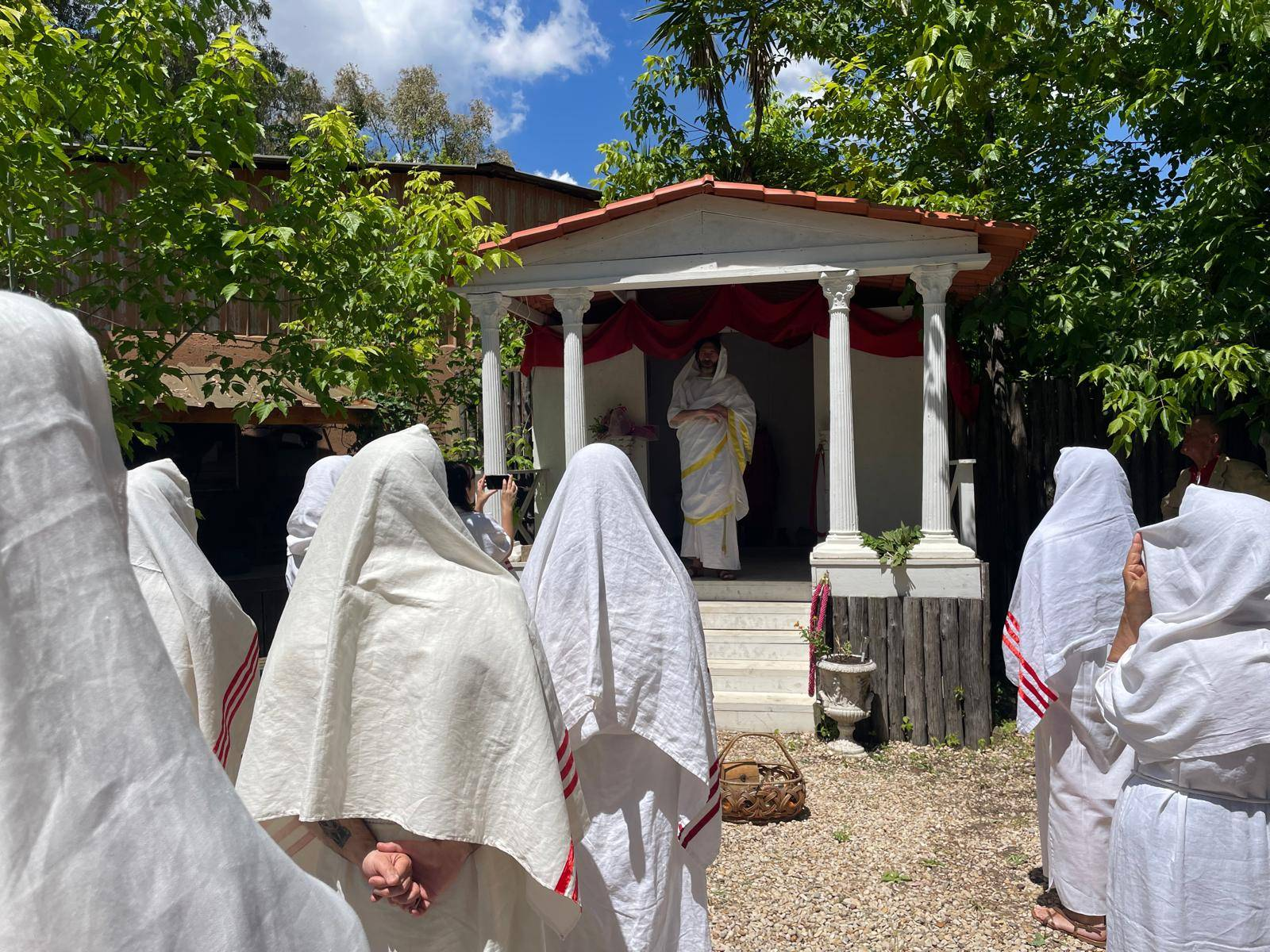
Ritual at the Temple of Mars on the Appian Way, erected by Pietas Comunità Gentile

Among the reconstructionist cults of classical era religions, there is Roman-Italic neopaganism, represented by the reconstructionist Roman religion, inspired by Roman mythology. Organizations adhering to this include Nova Roma, the Associazione Tradizionale Pietas, which manages various places of worship across several Italian regions, the Communitas Populi Romani, the Movimento Tradizionale Romano, the association with the longest continuous presence, the Societas Hesperiana pro Cultu Deorum, focused on the worship of the Genius Loci and sacred geography, and the Federazione Pagana, which presents elements more related to Greek mythology and neopagan and neowitchcraft forms. Another neopagan association present in Italy is Nova Roma.

There are also neopagans who claim to descend from or be inspired by other ancient European and Mediterranean religions, such as Germanic heathenry, inspired by Germanic mythology and Norse mythology, with adherents like the Comunità Odinista, the Tempio del Lupo (Wolfsangismo), the association Άsa-Ódhinn (Italian branch of the Asatru Folk Assembly), the Associazione Bosco di Chiatri, and the Tribù Winniler – Cerchio Bragafull (Vanatrú); Kemetism, inspired by the ancient Egyptian religion and represented by the association Kemetismo Ortodosso Solare; Celtic reconstructionism and druidism, inspired by Celtic mythology, represented by the Cerchio Druidico Italiano, the Ordine Druidico Italiano Bosco dell'Awen, and the Movimento Spirituale Riformato dei Nativi d'Insubria (Celtic neopaganism); and Hellenism, inspired by Greek mythology.

Among the movements classified as neo-shamanic, meaning they claim to descend from or be inspired by traditional shamanism, there are small groups in Italy that draw from the mysticism of pre-Columbian America, and others affiliated with the Goddess movement, such as the Tempio della Grande Dea in Rome and the Tempio della Dea in Turin and in Sassari.

In recent years, there has also been the emergence of very small neopagan groups in Italy with supremacist, neofascist, and neo-Nazi political leanings, whose religious views are aligned with Esoteric Nazism.

== See also ==
- Religion in Italy
- Italian folklore
- Witchcraft in Italy
- Stregheria
- Via Romana agli Dèi
- Julius Evola
