= Reconstructionist Roman religion =

Revival of ancient Roman polytheism

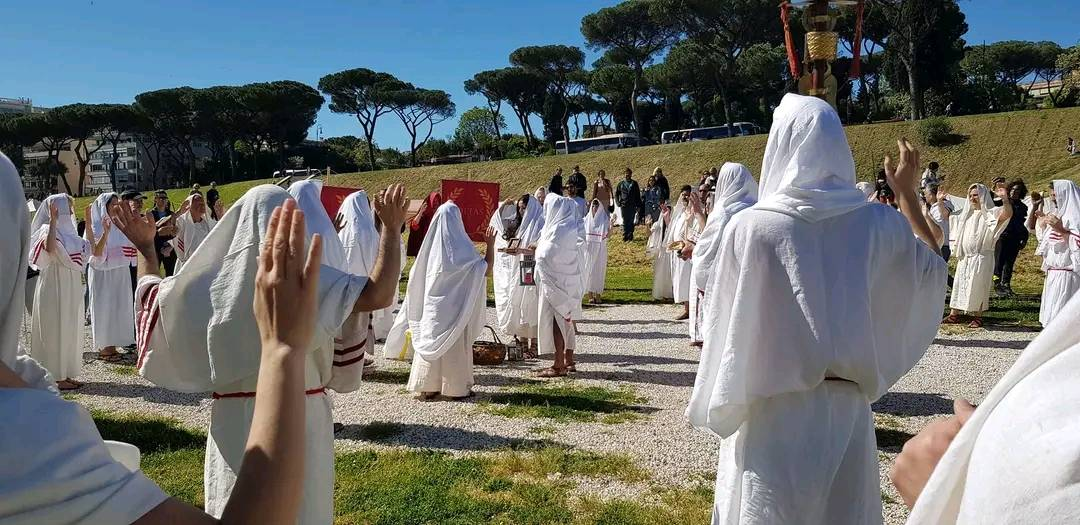
Pietas during the celebration of the 2777th Natale di Roma at Circus Maximus

Revivals of ancient Roman religions have taken various forms in the modern era. These efforts seek to re-establish the traditional Roman cults and customs, often referred to as cultus deorum romanorum (worship of the Roman gods), religio romana (Roman religion), via romana agli dei (the Roman way to the gods), Roman-Italic religion, or gentile Roman religion. Several loosely affiliated organizations have emerged in the contemporary period.

== History ==
=== Post-classical period ===
Christianity was introduced late in Mani Peninsula, with the first Greek temples converted into churches during the 11th century. Byzantine monk Nikon the Metanoeite (Greek: Νίκων ὁ Μετανοείτε) was sent in the 10th century to convert the predominantly pagan Maniots. Although his preaching began the conversion process, the Christianization took 200 years, ending around the 11th or 12th centuries. Patrick Leigh Fermor noted that the Maniots, isolated by mountains, were among the last Greeks to abandon the old religion, doing so towards the end of the 9th century:

Sealed off from outside influences by their mountains, the semi-troglodytic Maniots themselves were the last of the Greeks to be converted. They only abandoned the old religion of Greece towards the end of the ninth century. It is surprising to remember that this peninsula of rock, so near the heart of the Levant from which Christianity springs, should have been baptised three whole centuries after the arrival of St. Augustine in far-away Kent.

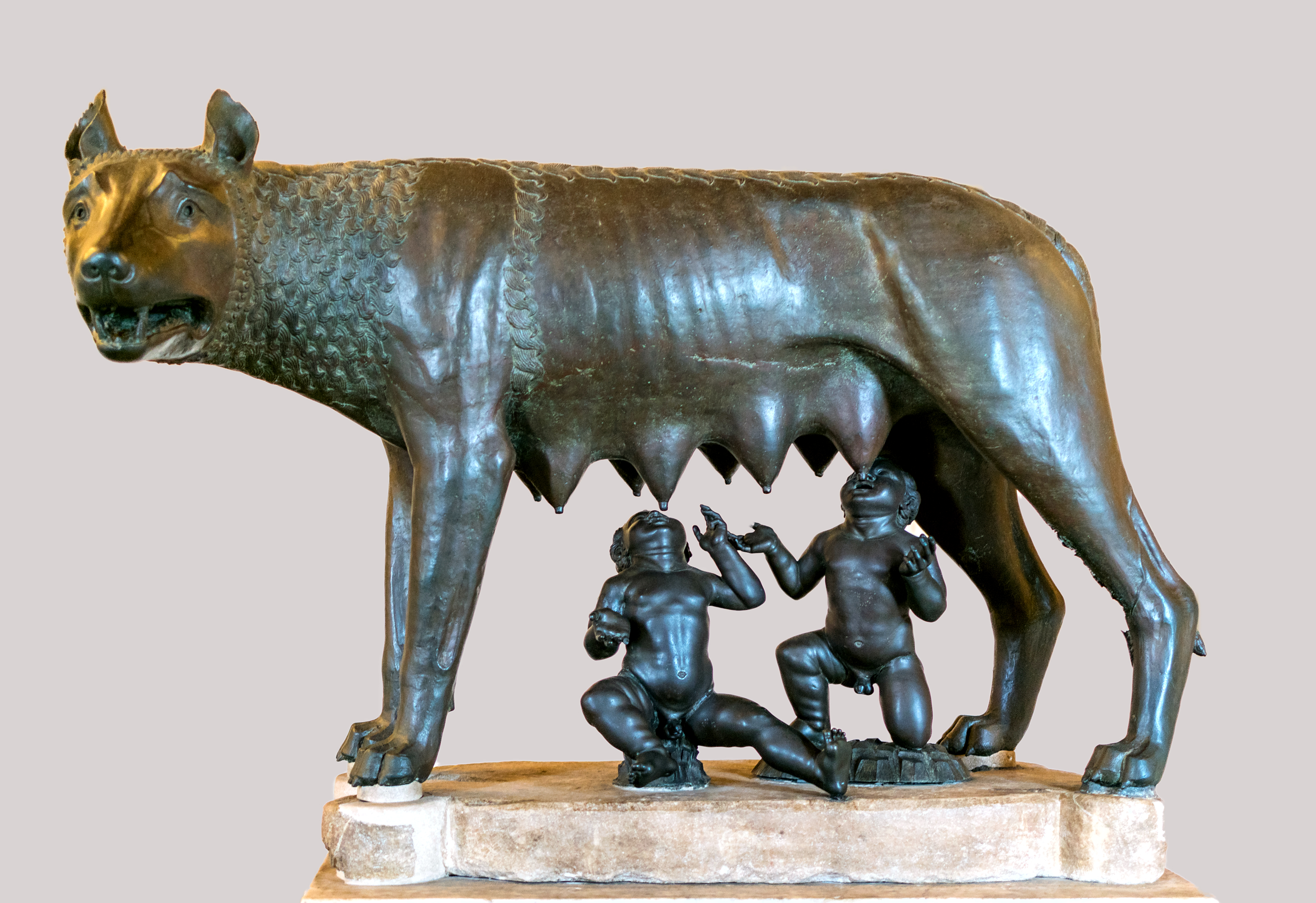
Capitoline Wolf, sculpture of the she-wolf feeding the twins Romulus and Remus, the most famous image associated with the founding of Rome.

According to Constantine VII in De Administrando Imperio, the Maniots were referred to as 'Hellenes' and were only fully Christianized in the 9th century, despite some 4th-century church ruins indicating an early Christian presence. The region's mountainous terrain allowed the Maniots to evade the Eastern Roman Empire's Christianization efforts, thereby preserving pagan traditions that coincided with significant years in the life of Gemistos Plethon.

Another safe area for the pagans was the city of Harran, which, despite the persecution of its pagan inhabitants by Byzantine Emperor Maurice, remained largely pagan well into the early Islamic period. When the city was besieged by the armies of the Rashidun Caliphate in 639–640, it was the pagan community that negotiated its peaceful surrender. Under the subsequent rule of the caliphates, Harran became a major settlement within the Diyar Mudar region and retained a significant degree of autonomy. During the First Fitna, the people of Harran sided with Mu'awiya I over Ali at the Battle of Siffin in 657, which allegedly resulted in a brutal retaliation by Ali, who massacred much of the population.

Under the Umayyad Caliphate (661–750), Harran prospered and was selected as the capital by the last Umayyad caliph, Marwan II, from 744 to 750. This move may have been influenced by the city's pagan sympathies and its strategic position near the empire's eastern provinces. The city's prominence under Umayyad rule saw it grow as a cultural and scholarly center, with the establishment of the first Muslim university in 717 under Umar II, attracting scholars from across the Islamic world.

Although Harran lost its capital status under the Abbasid Caliphate, it continued to flourish, particularly during the reign of Harun al-Rashid (786–809), when its university became a key center for translation and intellectual activity. The local religion, blending elements of Mesopotamian paganism and Neoplatonism, persisted into the 10th century, though periodic decrees enforced conversions to Islam, especially under Al-Ma'mun in 830. Nonetheless, Harran retained its heterogeneity, with a population that included Muslims, Christians, Jews, and a variety of other religious groups.

=== Renaissance to Risorgimento ===
The Osirian Egyptian Order (OOE), founded in the 18th century, claims that it preserves elements of ancient Roman and Mediterranean religions, via priests who fled Alexandria around 391 CE after the destruction of the Serapeum and settled in Naples. The OOE preserved Greco-Roman and Egyptian ritual traditions continuously over the centuries. Giuliano Kremmerz was initiated into the OOE in the late 19th century, and founded the Brotherhood of Myriam, which directly descends from the OOE. This claim can be understood as a form of survival, as opposed to revival, of ancient ritual practices, and it has influenced some modern pagan groups in Italy.

Interest in reviving ancient Roman religious traditions can be traced to the Renaissance, with figures such as Gemistus Pletho who influenced Cosimo de Medici to establish the Florentine Neoplatonic Academy and Julius Pomponius Laetus (student of Pletho) who advocated for a revival and established the Roman academy which secretly celebrated the Natale di Roma, an annual festival held in Rome on 21 April to celebrate the founding of the city. According to legend, Romulus is said to have founded the city of Rome on 21 April, 753 BC. From this date, the Roman chronology derived its system, known by the Latin phrase Ab urbe condita, meaning 'from the founding of the City', which counted the years from this presumed foundation. The Academy was dissolved in 1468 when Pope Paul II ordered the arrest and execution of some of its members; Pope Sixtus IV allowed Laetus to reopen the academy until the Sack of Rome in 1527.

After the French Revolution, the French lawyer Gabriel André Aucler (mid 1700s–1815) adopted the name Quintus Nautius and sought to revive paganism, styling himself as its leader. He designed religious clothing and performed pagan rites at his home. In 1799, he published La Thréicie, presenting his religious views. His teachings were later analyzed by Gérard de Nerval in Les Illuminés (1852). Admiring ancient Greece and ancient Rome, Aucler supported the French Revolution and saw it as a path to restoring an ancient republic. He took the name Quintus Nautius, claimed Roman priestly lineage, and performed Orphic rites at his home. His followers were mainly his household. In 1799, he published La Thréicie, advocating a revival of paganism in France, condemning Christianity, and promoting universal animation.

In his later years, Aucler published a poem that some interpret as a recantation of his beliefs. He died in 1815 in Bourges. His pagan rites influenced the occultist Lazare Lenain, while Gérard de Nerval wrote an essay about him in Les Illuminés (1852).

During 19th-century Italy, the fall of the Papal States and the process of Italian unification fostered anti-clerical sentiment among the intelligentsia. Intellectuals like archaeologist Giacomo Boni Pagan and writer Roggero Musmeci Ferrari Bravo promoted the restoration of Roman religious practices.

=== Modern era ===
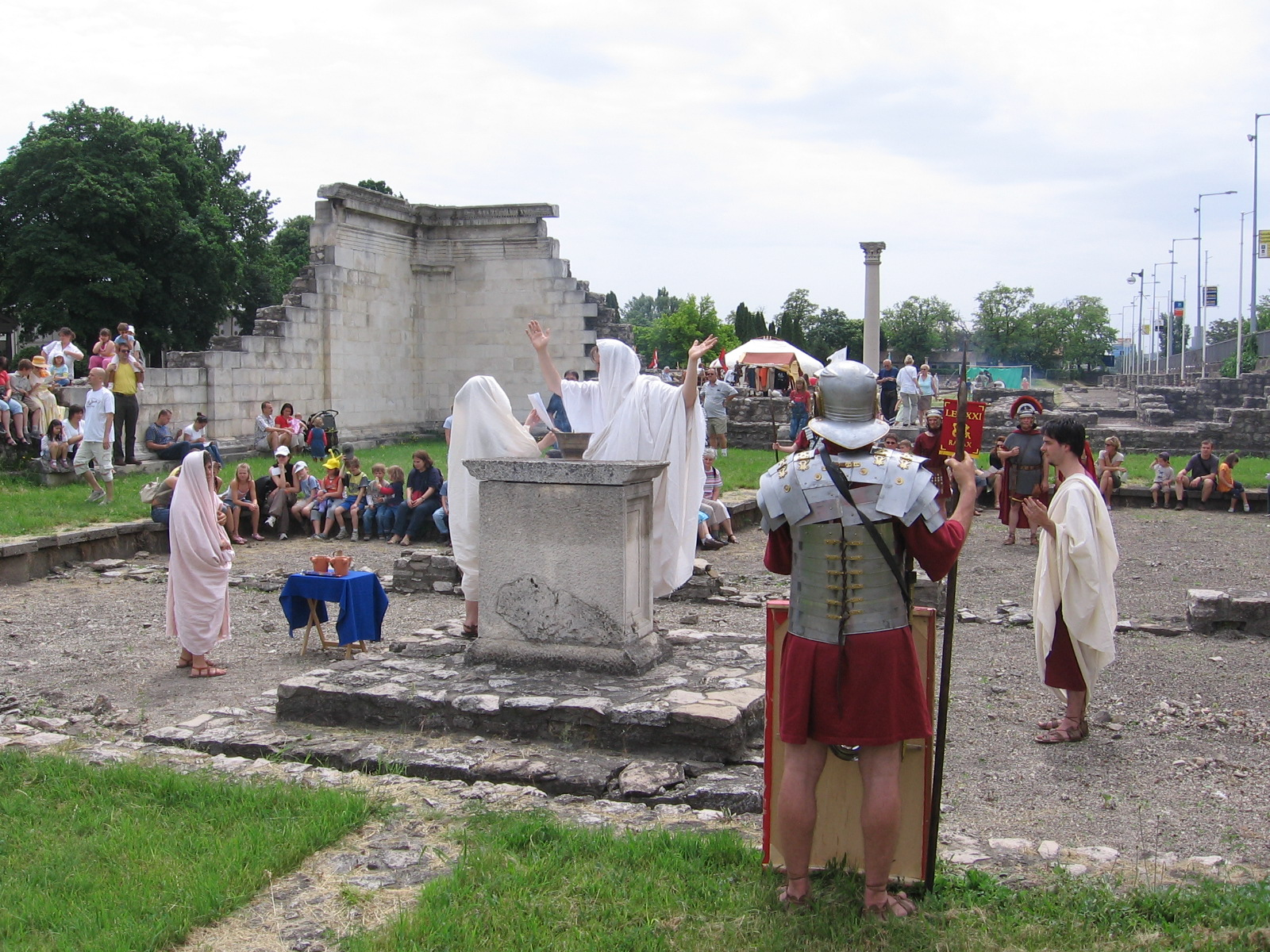
Nova Romans performing a Roman religious ceremony in Aquincum (Budapest)

Some religious revivalists were also involved in occultism, Pythagoreanism, and Freemasonry, including figures like Amedeo Rocco Armentano, Arturo Reghini, and Giulio Parise. In 1914, Reghini published Imperialismo Pagano (Pagan Imperialism), claiming an unbroken initiatory lineage in Italy that linked ancient Roman religion to modern times, via historical figures such as Numa Pompilius, Virgil, Dante Alighieri, and Giuseppe Mazzini.

Efforts to revive Roman cults coincided with the rise of the National Fascist Party, and several polytheists attempted to form alliances with fascism. However, the signing of the Lateran Treaty in 1929 by Benito Mussolini and Pope Pius XI left polytheists like Musmeci and Reghini disillusioned. Influenced by Reghini's work and the Ur Group, modern groups have emerged in Italy, including the Associazione Tradizionale Pietas (established in 2005) and the Roman Traditional Movement.

The public appeal for pre-Christian Roman spirituality in the years following fascism was largely driven by Julius Evola. By the late 1960s, a renewed "operational" interest in pagan Roman traditions emerged from youth circles around Evola, particularly concerning the experience of the Gruppo di Ur. Evola's writings incorporated concepts from outside classical Roman religion, such as Buddhism, Hinduism, sexual magic, and private ritual nudity. This period saw the rise of the Gruppo dei Dioscuri in cities like Rome, Naples, and Messina, which published a series of four booklets, including titles such as L'Impeto della vera cultura and Rivoluzione Tradizionale e Sovversione, before fading from public view.

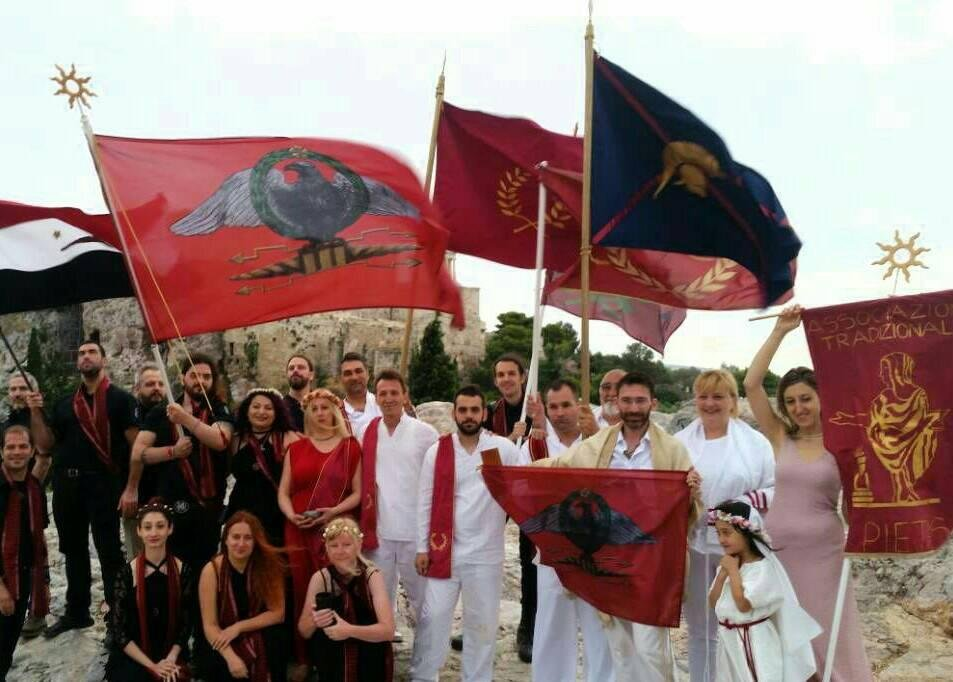
Meeting between Thyrsus, YSEE, and Pietas Comunità Gentile

Contrary to some claims of dissolution, particularly by Renato del Ponte, the group continued its activities after its founder's death in 2000, with its last public appearance being a conference titled "Oltre ogni distruzione – la Tradizione vive." Interest in ancient Roman religion also appeared in the Evolian magazine Arthos, founded in Genoa in 1972, directed by Renato del Ponte, who authored works like Dei e miti italici (1985) and La religione dei Romani (1993). In 1984, experiences from the Dioscuri were revisited in the Gruppo Arx led by Salvatore Ruta, a former member of the original group. Between 1984 and 1986, the Pythagorean Association, claimed to be a continuation of Arturo Reghini's original group, emerged in Calabria and Sicily, publishing the magazine Yghìeia until it ceased in 1988. Member Roberto Sestito then initiated various editorial activities, including the magazine Ignis (1990–1992) and the bulletin Il flauto di Pan (2000), though pagan-Roman themes were notably absent. The Genoese publisher Il Basilisco released numerous works in the Collana di Studi Pagani between 1979 and 1989, featuring texts by notable figures such as Simmaco, Porfirio, and emperor Julian. The theme of Roman Tradition also appeared in the journal Politica Romana (1994–2004) of the association Senatus, considered by many to be a Roman-pagan, Pythagorean, and "Reghiniana" publication. A prominent activist during this time was actor Roberto Corbiletto, who died mysteriously in a lightning-related fire in 1999.

=== 2000s ===
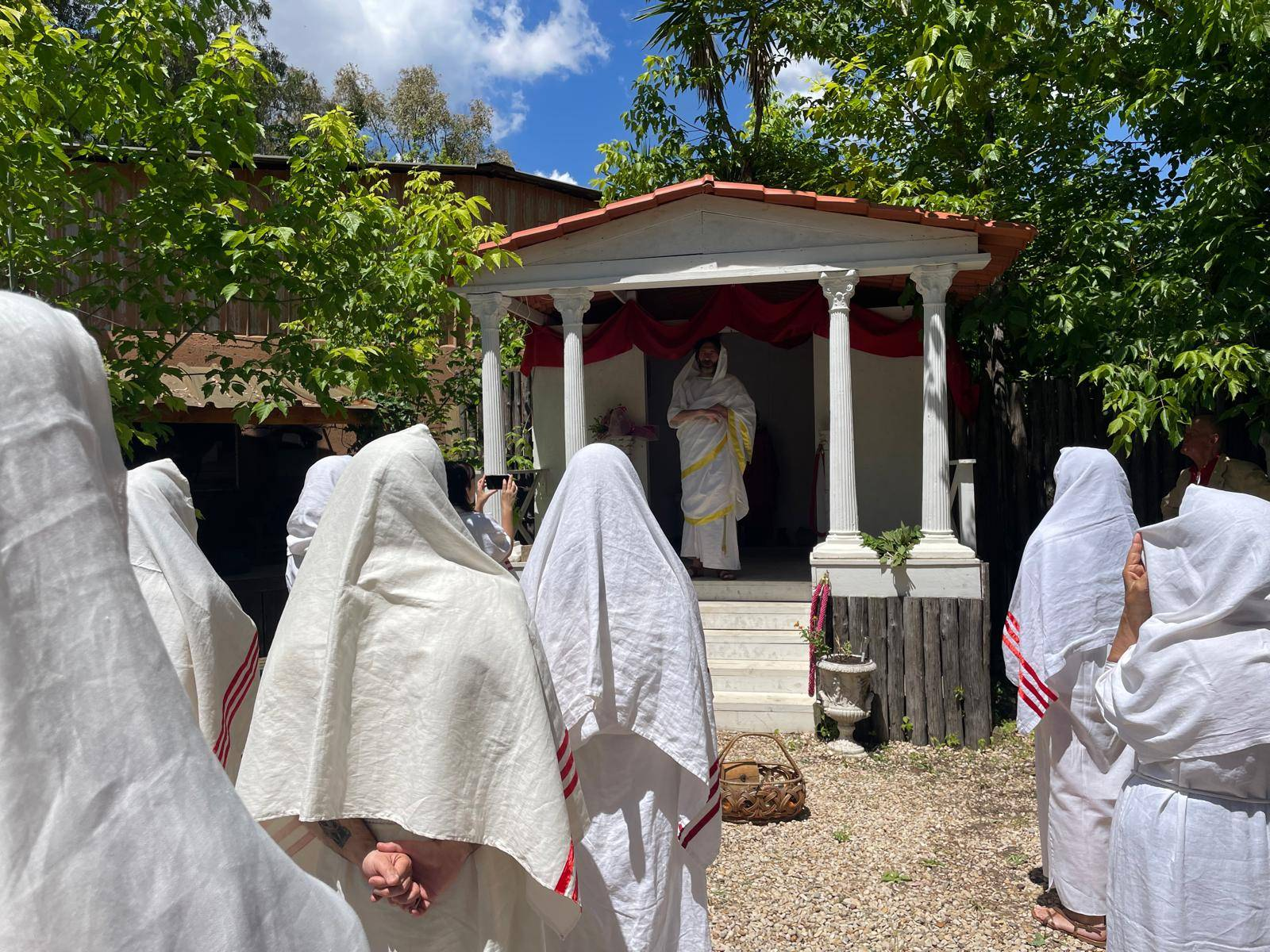
Pietas celebrating the 2777th Natale di Roma at the Temple of Mars on the Appian Way

In the 2000s, Associazione Tradizionale Pietas began reconstructing temples across Italy and sought legal recognition from the state, drawing inspiration from similar groups like YSEE in Greece. In 2023, Pietas participated in the ECER meeting, resulting in the signing of the Riga Declaration, which calls for the recognition of European ethnic religions.

Public rituals, such as those celebrating the ancient festival of the Natale di Roma, have also resumed in recent years. Nowadays, "Natale di Roma" has been celebrated with conferences and historical reenactments. In recent years, this event has regained significance, prompting Italian institutions to recognize it more widely. Associations such as the "Gruppo Storico Romano" (GSR) have helped organize the event through historical reenactments and religious events, with affiliated associations involved in modern Roman religion. The Gruppo Storico Romano annually organizes a parade with participants in period costumes and representations of scenes from ancient life and celebrations that echo the religious rites of ancient Rome.

In 2024, the 2777th "Natale di Roma" was held, with the participation of Italian institutional representatives. During the event, a plan was announced to increase funding for historical reenactments and to consider legislation to regulate such celebrations and preserve and enhance cultural traditions. Additionally, the Italian Army band participated in the celebrations. Every year, organizations from across Europe come to celebrate this date, demonstrating the importance and international appeal of the event.

The idea of practicing Roman religion in the modern era has spread beyond Italy, with practitioners found in countries across Europe and the Americas. The most prominent international organization is Nova Roma, founded in 1998, with active groups worldwide.

== See also ==
- Hellenism (modern religion)
- Neopaganism in Italy

== Sources ==
- Bosworth, C. E. (2003). "ḤARRĀN". Encyclopaedia Iranica, Vol. XII, Fasc. 1. pp. 13–14.
- Frew, Donald (1999). "Harran: Last Refuge of Classical Paganism". The Pomegranate: The International Journal of Pagan Studies. 13 (9): 17–29. doi:10.1558/pome.v13i9.17.
- Gaume, Jean-Joseph (1856). La Révolution (in French). Vol. 2. Paris: Gaume freres.
- Gérardin, Ghislaine; Gérardin, Lucien (1974). La magie : un savoir en action (in French). Paris: Celt. ISBN 2-7256-0053-7.
- Lamoureux, Jean-Baptiste-Justin (1843). "Auclerc (Gabriel-André)". In Michaud, Louis-Gabriel (ed.). Biographie universelle : ancienne et moderne. Vol. 1. Paris: Thoisnier Desplaces.
- Merkin, Lucy (2014). Nerval's Illimunés, Eccentricity, and the Evolution of Madness (PDF) (PhD). University of Edinburgh.
- Özdeniz, M. B; Bekleyen, A; Gönül, I. A; Gönül, H; Sarigül, H; Ilter, T; Dalkiliç, N; Yildirim, M (1998). "Vernacular domed houses of Harran, Turkey". Habitat International. 22 (4): 477–485. doi:10.1016/S0197-3975(98)00027-7. ISSN 0197-3975.
- Pingree, David (2002). "The Ṣābians of Ḥarrān and the Classical Tradition". International Journal of the Classical Tradition. 9 (1): 8–35. doi:10.1007/BF02901729. ISSN 1073-0508. JSTOR 30224282. S2CID 170507750.
