= Classical reenactment =

Classical reenactment or ancient reenactment tends to focus on portrayals of the Greco-Roman world, and especially on modern recreations of Roman legions and ancient Greek hoplites.

== Roman reenactment ==
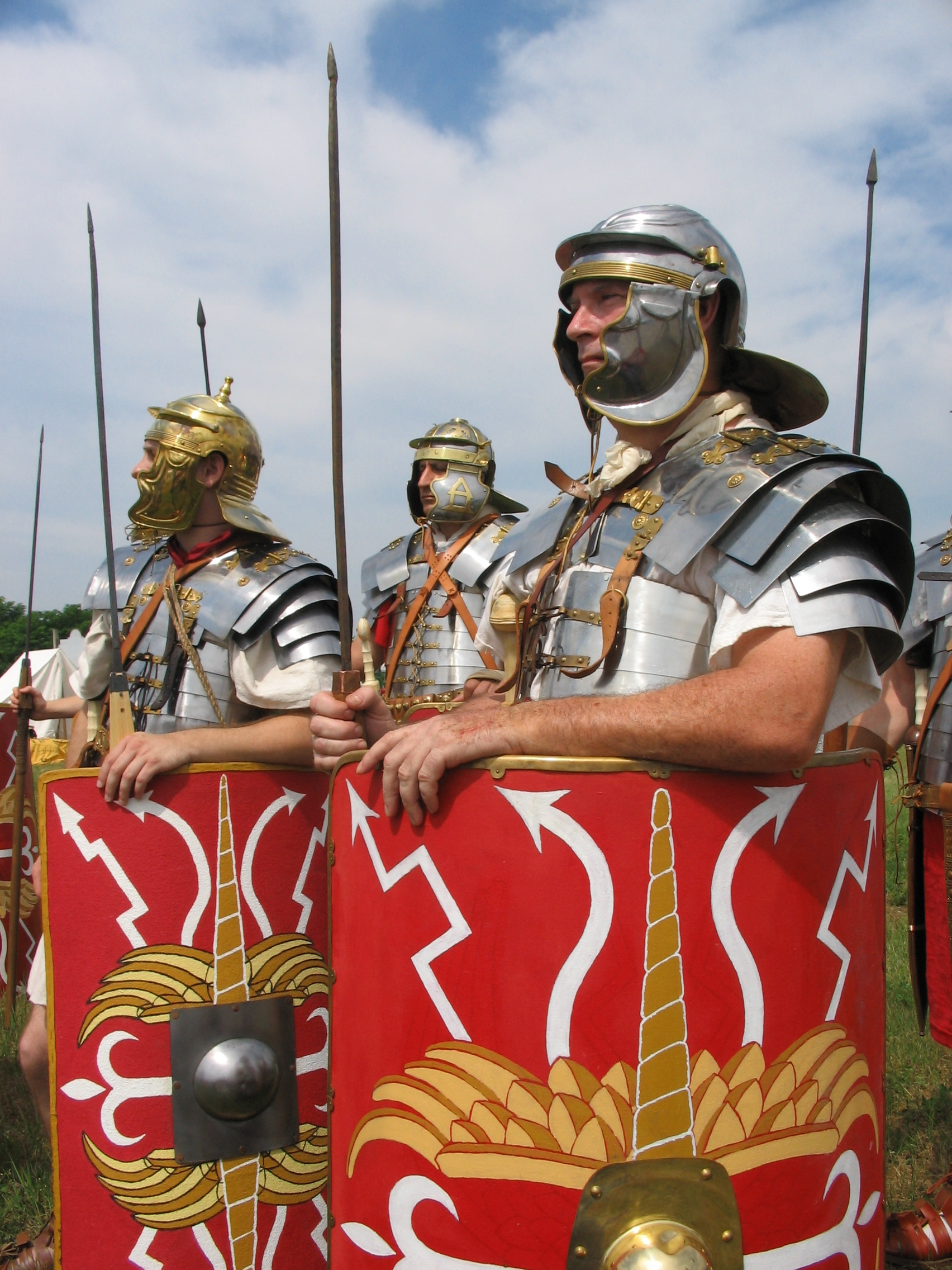
Reenactors portraying 1st–2nd century AD Roman legionaries

Most Roman reenacting groups generally portray one particular Roman legion; nearly all of the legions portrayed actually existed historically, and most reenactors strive to recreate the legion as accurately as possible. This attention to realism generally extends to the equipment worn and displayed, and to the behavior displayed to each other and especially to the public; indeed, many public demonstrations attempt to recreate Roman military drills, marches, and even staged mock battles.

Roman reenactment groups usually welcome women and children, in an effort to both accommodate entire families and to portray Roman civilian life. Additionally, it is not unknown for reenactors to portray consuls, senators, or even a Roman emperor.

The Roman Army composition, equipment and tactics changed notably through the centuries and whilst some groups seek to demonstrate some of these changes in displays, most groups focus on a particular time period, often associated with the peak period of the legionary unit they represent. The most popular period is probably the 1st-2nd century, with legionaries wearing the characteristic segmented armour illustrated on Trajan's Column. However, some groups portray the Late Roman legion, after the army reforms of Diocletian. A minority of groups depict the eastern continuance of the empire after the fall of Rome in the west, known popularly as the Byzantine Empire.

Roman reenacting is popular in both the United States and Europe. One of the largest military-themed Roman reentacment groups in the world is Legio XXI Rapax based in Europe, demonstrating the heritage of a real ancient unit – Legio XXI Rapax (21st Rapacious). Their group, claiming over 100 active members, includes participants from Poland, Germany, Luxembourg, the Netherlands & Czech Rep.

There are also other significant reenactment and living-history organizations that not only specialize in Roman military but include all other aspects of ancient Roman society with a holistic approach: the most notable example is Nova Roma, an umbrella organization with thousands of members which is currently the largest network of Roman reenactment groups. Founded in 1998, Nova Roma focuses on ancient Roman reenactment, and connects the reenactors with their audience in a general spirit of Roman cultural education and cultural revivalism with particular attention to the study of the Latin language, Roman culture and politics, the reconstruction of Roman ceremonies, and supports chapters in numerous countries, like that of Australia Nova Romana in Oceania.

=== Roman gladiator reenactment ===
A smaller subset of Roman reenactors attempt to recreate Roman gladiator troupes. Some of these groups are part of larger Roman reenactment groups, and others are wholly independent, though they might participate in larger demonstrations of Roman reenacting or historical reenacting in general. These groups usually focus on portraying mock gladiatorial combat in as accurate a manner as possible.

== Ancient Greek reenactment ==
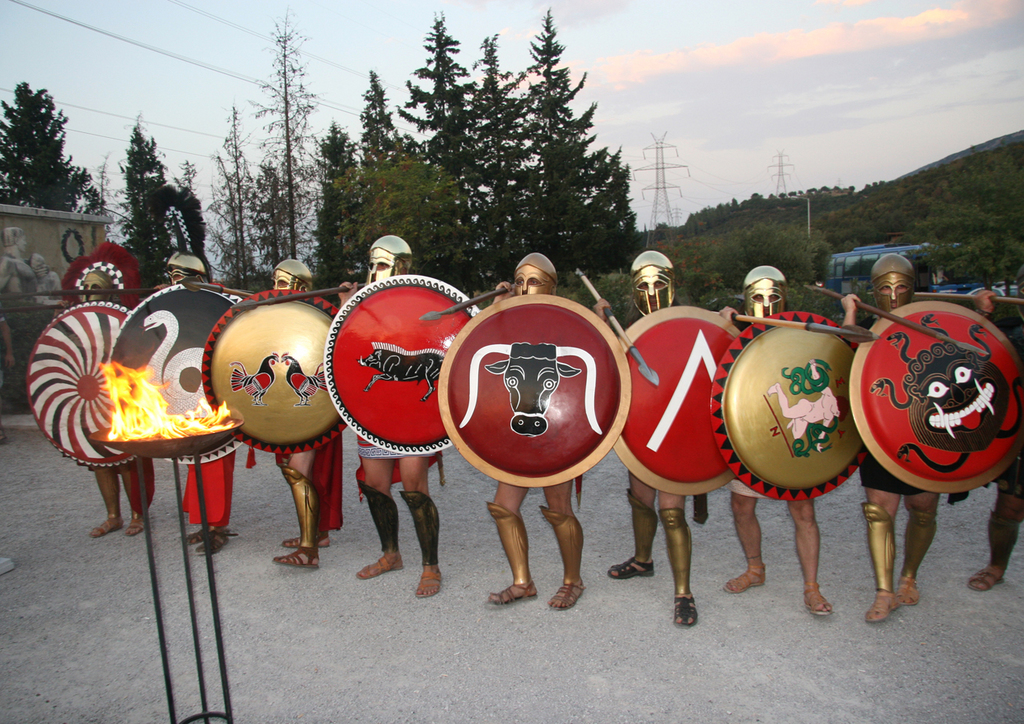
Reenactors portraying 5th-century BC Greek hoplites

Greek reenacting groups concentrate mostly on classical era hoplites, though the Archaic, Hellenistic and Mycenaean eras are becoming popular as well. Most reenactors focus on Greek hoplites and tend to depict the classical era, particularly the period around the Peloponnesian Wars, but accurate depictions of Greeks in the earlier Mycenaean and other eras have become increasingly more common, especially the era of the Persian War and reenactments of the Macedonian phalanx. Aside from groups, there are individuals who sometimes reenact the heroes of ancient Greece.

International conventions are being held, with the first being in Watford, Britain, in summer 2006.

Some groups stage mock battles such as the [Spartan warband] that equips its members with durable aspis and other period equipment, reenacting Phalanx formation tactics to their fullest extent by depicting two hoplite squads of reenactors clashing with each other. The Spartan Army is very popular as a theme, as can be evidenced by the group called The Hellenic Warriors, who appear at museums, schools, and universities on the east coast of the United States.

Greek reenacting is popular in the United States, Europe and Australia and whose members from around the world will gather at the International Ancient Greek Hoplite Festival

== Celtic reenactment ==
Continental and insular Celts and Gauls are the subjects of some reenacting groups, with a focus on anything from tribal warfare to even domestic re-enactment of Pre-Roman Celtic societies. Many specific tribes are being re-enacted, as are important events such as battles and festivals. Typically, Celtic groups are sister groups to a Roman legion, and are sometimes created originally to portray the Roman invasion of Gaul under Julius Caesar.

== See also ==
- List of ancient reenactment groups
- Hellenic Polytheistic Reconstructionism
