= Renato Del Ponte =

Italian essayist (1944–2023)

- Born: 21 December 1944; Lodi, Italian Social Republic
- Died: 5 February 2023 (aged 78); Fivizzano, Italy
- Education: University of Genoa
- Occupations: Essayist; Teacher; Translator

Renato Del Ponte (21 December 1944 – 5 February 2023) was an Italian essayist, teacher, and translator.

== Biography ==
Born in Lodi on 21 December 1944, Del Ponte studied classical studies at the University of Genoa. After the death of Julius Evola on 11 June 1974, his ashes were scattered by Del Ponte and Eugène David off of a cliff face on Monte Rosa. Two years prior, Del Ponte had become editor-in-chief of the magazine Arthos.

Del Ponte was an adherent of Roman neopaganism which is a major subject in his literary output, notably in the books Il movimento tradizionalista romano nel '900 (1987), La religione dei Romani (1992), Evola e il magico Gruppo di Ur (1994), I Liguri: etnogenesi di un popolo (1999), La città degli Dei: la tradizione di Roma e la sua continuità (2003) and Favete Linguis! Saggi sulle fondamenta del Sacro in Roma antica (2010).

Del Ponte died in Fivizzano on 5 February 2023 at the age of 78.

== Works ==
- Dei e miti italici: archetipi e forme della sacralità romano-italica (1985)
- Il movimento tradizionalista romano nel '900 (1987)
- La religione dei Romani (1992)
- Evola e il magico Gruppo di Ur (1994)
- I Liguri: etnogenesi di un popolo (1999)
- La città degli Dei: la tradizione di Roma e la sua continuità (2003)
- Favete Linguis!: saggi sulle fondamenta del Sacro in Roma antica (2010)
- Ambrosiae pocula (2011)
- Nella terra del drago: note insolite di viaggio nel regno del Bhutan (2012)

== Awards ==
- Premio "Isola d'Elba" (1992)
- Premio "Cinque Terre - riviera ligure" (2000)
- "Trofeo Premio Liguria" (2020)
