= Roggero Musmeci Ferrari Bravo =

Italian poet and playwright

- Born: 2 March 1868; Palermo, Kingdom of Italy
- Died: 6 May 1937 (aged 69); Rome, Italy
- Other name: ignis
- Occupations: Poet; playwright

Roggero Musmeci Ferrari Bravo (2 March 1868 – 6 May 1937), known under the pen name ignis, was an Italian poet and playwright. He is best known for his play Rumon: Sacrae Romae Origines, first performed in 1923.

== Early life ==
Roggero Musmeci Ferrari Bravo was born in Palermo on Sicily on 2 March 1868. His father died when he was young, after which his mother moved with him to Rome. He gained a medical degree in surgery and a second degree in jurisprudence. He soon chose to not pursue a career related to his degrees, but to devote his time to becoming a writer.

== Literary career ==
His literary output can be understood in the context of the anti-clerical tendencies during the Risorgimento and the fall of the Papal States. During this period, a part of the Italian intelligentsia entertained the idea of returning to paganism as a viable way forward. Musmeci adopted the pen name ignis, which is Latin for "fire", because he regarded himself as a creative spark that would help to revive the Roman mores and religion. He spelled the name with a lower case I to signify that he only was one of many such sparks. He participated in the intellectual milieu of the Caffé d'Aragno, which included people such as Filippo Tommaso Marinetti, Giuseppe Ungaretti and Ardengo Soffici. Musmeci's poetry collection Carme a Roma, published in 1914, contains the theme of a Roman pagan renaissance as well as hostility toward the Catholic Church. Also in 1914, his play Quando le colonne rovinano premiered in Rome and Trieste.

His most significant work is Rumon: Sacrae Romae Origines, a tragic play in five acts. It tells the mythological story of the founding of Rome, from the origin of Romulus and Remus, to Romulus' ascencion to the heavens. On 21 April 1914, Musmeci recited the play in his home to a small audience of invited bohemians and literary critics. It received positive newspaper reviews and there were discussions about staging the play outdoors on the Palatine Hill, but Italy's entry in World War I ended those plans. When the National Fascist Party came to power, Musmeci saw a new opportunity to get Rumon produced, thanks to the influence his friends Soffici and Giacomo Boni had on Benito Mussolini. After some compromises, the third act of Rumon was performed on the Palatine Hill on 6 May 1923, starring prominent actors of the day. The reception was positive and several critics compared the performance to a rite. The play was published in print in 1929, the same year as Mussolini signed the Lateran Treaty, which ended the hopes of those who like Musmeci had wished to see a pagan re-emergence under fascism.

== Later life ==
Musmeci left the literary scene and became increasingly embittered with fascism. He devoted his time to study sculpture and divine proportions. In 1931 he published the book Appunti su la scoperta della "divina proporzione", which summarises his studies of Pythagorean numerology. He died in poverty in 1937.

== Selected works ==
- Carme a Roma (1914)
- Quando le colonne rovinano (1914)
- Rumon: Sacrae Romae Origines (1914; printed in 1929)
- Appunti su la scoperta della "divina proporzione" (1931)
