= Polytheistic reconstructionism =

Attempts to re-establish historical polytheistic religions

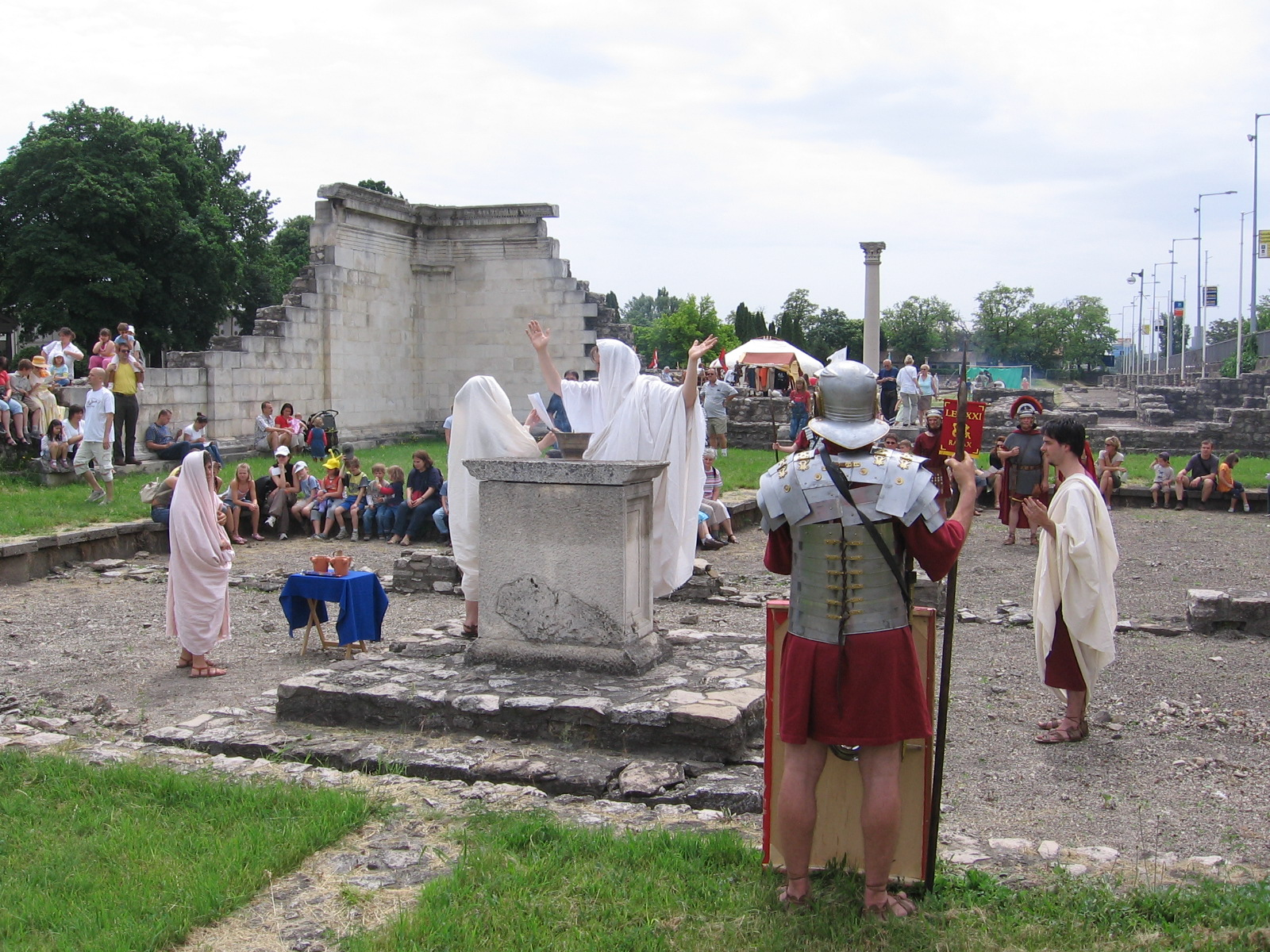
Nova Roma sacrifice to Concordia at Aquincum (Budapest), Floralia 2008

Polytheistic reconstructionism (or simply reconstructionism) is an approach to modern paganism first emerging in the late 1960s to early 1970s, which gathered momentum starting in the 1990s. Reconstructionism attempts to re-establish genuine polytheistic religions in the modern world through a rediscovery of the rituals, practices and contextual worldviews of pre-Christian pagan religions. This method stands in contrast with other neopagan syncretic movements like Wicca, and ecstatic/esoteric movements like Germanic mysticism or Theosophy.

While the emphasis on historical accuracy may imply historical reenactment, the difference between these two movements can be summarized as one of intent. Historical reenactment seeks historical accuracy as a goal in and of itself. On the other hand, a reconstructionist neopagan views historical accuracy as a means to the end of establishing a harmonious relationship between a belief-community and the gods.

In short, the guiding principles of the reconstructionist approach to the practice of pre-Christian religion can be broken down as follows:

1. The pre-Christian pagans had a harmonious relationship to their deities.
2. The rites and rituals of those pagans were an essential part of the navigation and mediation of that relationship.
3. If modern-day pagans wish to re-establish a harmonious relationship with these deities, then these rituals and rites must be properly performed.
4. To properly perform the rituals in the present day, modern pagans must discover how and why they were performed in the past.

The term "reconstructionist paganism" was likely coined by Isaac Bonewits in the late 1970s. Bonewits has said that he is not sure whether he "got this use of the term from one or more of the other culturally focused Neopagan movements of the time, or if [he] just applied it in a novel fashion".

Margot Adler later used the term "Pagan Reconstructionists" in the 1979 edition of Drawing Down the Moon to refer to neopagans who endeavour to revive or "reconstruct" an authentic pre-Christian religious practice through use of historically verifiable research in fields such as: archeology, folklore studies and anthropology.

This emphasis on reconstruction contrasts with the more syncretic, eclectic or occult approaches to neopaganism, as seen for example in Thelema or Wicca.

== Within broader neopaganism ==
Linzie (2004) enumerates the difference between modern reconstructionist polytheism, such as modern Hellenismos or Nova Roma, and "classical" paganism as found in eighteenth to mid-twentieth century movements, including Germanic mysticism, early Neodruidism and Wicca. Aspects of the former, not found in the latter, are as follows:

1. There is no attempt to recreate a combined pan-European paganism.
2. Researchers attempt to stay within research guidelines developed over the course of the past century for handling documentation generated in the time periods that they are studying.
3. A multi-disciplinary approach is utilized capitalizing on results from various fields as historical literary research, anthropology, religious history, political history, archaeology, forensic anthropology, historical sociology, etc. with an overt attempt to avoid pseudo-sciences.
4. There are serious attempts to recreate culture, politics, science and art of the period "in order to better understand the environment within which the religious beliefs were practiced".

Emphasis has been added to show that the recreation of pre-Christian social conditions are done so with the intent of understanding the religious practices and beliefs, not in order to recreate or revive a pre-Christian society either to replace modern society or to exist in parallel to modern society. The latter intention would be more indicative of a traditionalist or a historical reenactment approach, and not specifically a reconstructionist neopagan.

The goal of these methods is to create a set of rituals, rites and practices which facilitate a harmonious relationship between the gods (and other good spirits like landwights or others) and the belief-community.

Reconstructionist neopagans hope that this harmony both within the belief-community itself and between the gods and the community brings some kind of tangible or intangible good. As in Germanic Heathenry, proper offerings (blót) to the gods are thought to bring about "peace and plenty" (árs ok friðar).

The use of the terms "pagan" and "neopagan" to refer to polytheistic reconstructionists is controversial. Some reconstructionist religious groups take great issue with being referred to as "pagan" or "neopagan," viewing "pagan" as a pejorative term.

Even among those reconstructionist groups who see themselves as part of the broader, pagan or neopagan spectrum, they may refuse the terms and their associations with the more problematic aspects of that community, such as eclecticism, cultural appropriation or Wiccan-inspired ritual structures.

== Sources ==
- Adler, Margot (2006) [1979]. "Chapter 9. Religions from the Past — The Pagan Reconstructionists". Drawing Down the Moon: Witches, Druids, Goddess-Worshippers, and Other Pagans in America Today (Reprint rev. and expand. ed.). New York: Penguin/Arcana. ISBN 0-14-019536-X. | at Archive.org
- Linzie, Bil (2008). "Reconstructionism's Role in Modern Heathenry" (PDF). Seidhman.
- Linzie, Bil (2004). "Uncovering the Effects of Cultural Background on the Reconstruction of Ancient Worldviews" (PDF). Seidhman.
