= Simmaco =

Surname of Italian origin

- Pronunciation: /ˈsɪməkoʊ/ SIM-ə-koh

Origin
- Languages: Italian, derived from the Latin, originally Latinized Greek
- Meaning: From the Greek Σύμμαχος, meaning "ally", or "trusted friend" / "confidante"
- Region of origin: Italy (originally), United Kingdom, United States

Other names
- Variant form: Symmachus (historical)
- Frequency Comparisons: (extremely rare)

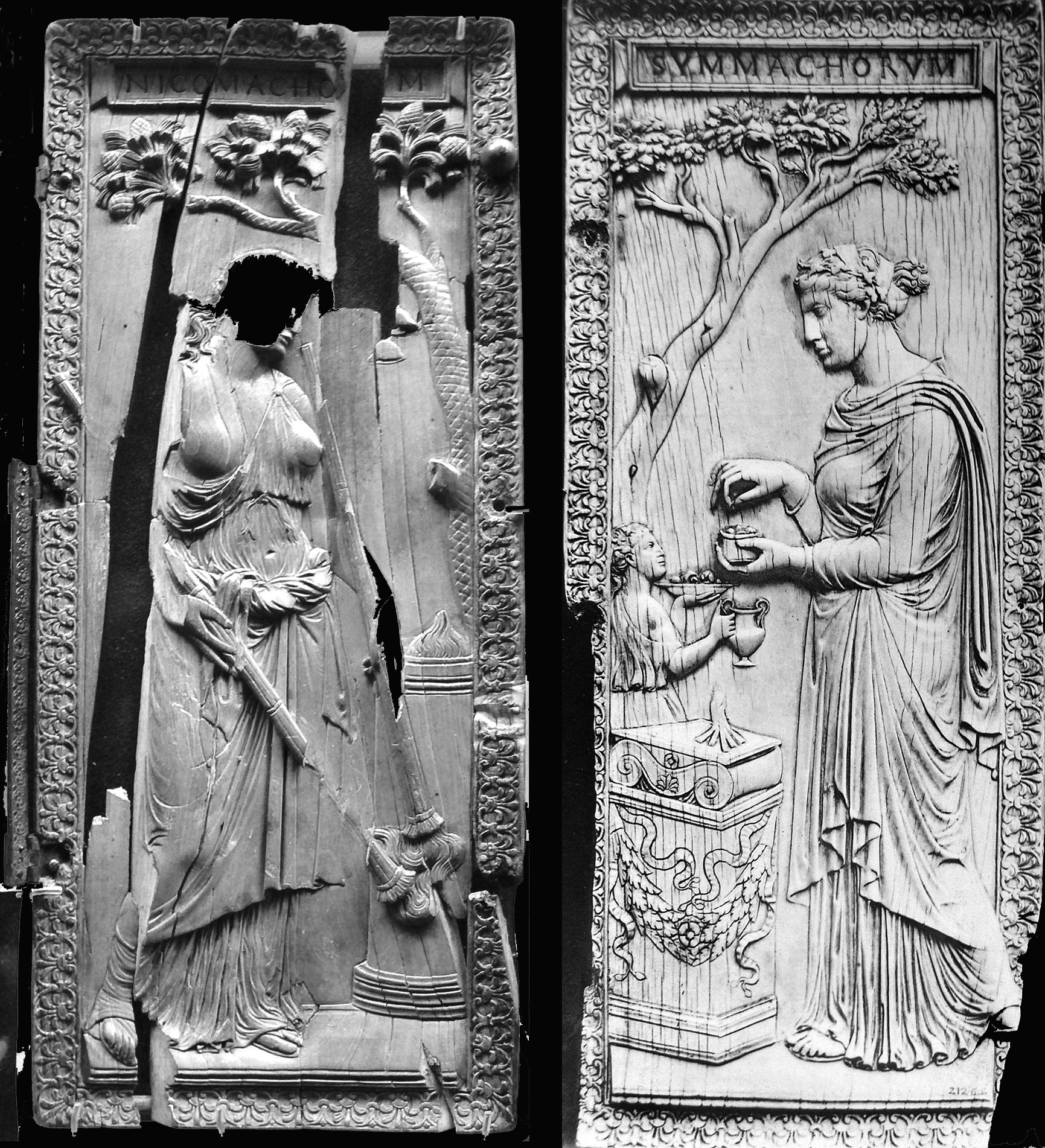
The Symmachi–Nicomachi diptych, celebrating a marriage between the Nicomachian and Symmachian families

Simmaco is an Italian surname of Roman origin.

== History ==
The family was one of the most prominent Plebeian families during late antiquity, producing several consuls, plebeian tribunes, provincial governors, urban prefects (or "mayors" of the city of Rome), and scholarly men of letters. Despite being most notable for their defense of Roman polytheism and traditional Roman culture (especially by Quintus Aurelius Symmachus) during the Theodosian persecution of paganism, the family also had several distinguished Christian members during the Ante-Nicene Period, including an early pope, Symmachus. The Christian philosopher Boethius was adopted into the family as a child, and named his son Symmachus in their honor.

Being at the centre of the many political trials and tribulations both before and after the sack of Rome, the family declined significantly. Several members were executed for their political allegiances and religious beliefs, especially by the Goths and Vandals.

== Demographics ==
As of 2015 it is one of the rarest surnames in the world, with only about 60 carriers.
