= Roman academies =

Associations of Italian scholars

Roman academies were associations of learned individuals, rather than institutes for instruction. They were connected with larger educational structures conceived during and after the Italian Renaissance, at the height of which (from the end of the Western Schism in 1417 to the mid-16th century) the two main intellectual centers were Florence and Rome. Scientific, literary, and artistic culture developed, with the earlier Roman and Florentine academies as examples.

== History ==
=== The Renaissance ===
==== Bessarion's circle ====
Renaissance academies in Rome and Florence aimed to reproduce the traditions of Plato's Academy, promoting the cultivation of philosophy in the Ancient Greek sense of "love of wisdom" characterized by Renaissance Platonism and neoplatonism. The home of Cardinal and Byzantine Greek exile Basilios Bessarion, one of several meeting places for scholarly events and discussion, was known as an academia (academy). Bessarion's extensive library, which he bequeathed to the city of Venice, was at the disposal of his many houseguests. His visitors included learned Greek refugees whom he supported by commissioning transcripts of Greek manuscripts and translations into Latin to make Greek scholarship available to Western Europeans.

==== Pomponio's Accademia Romana ====
Another circle of humanists has become known as the "Roman Academy" (Accademia Romana) of Pomponio. A thrifty humanist scholar who refused the customary patronage of rich cardinals, Pomponio Leto hosted a circle of friends who shared pagan-influenced humanism which was becoming characteristic of Renaissance Rome and elsewhere. Born in Teggiano in 1425 as Giulio Sanseverino, son of a Sanseverino nobleman, Pomponio devoted his energies in Rome to the study of classical antiquity and became the centre of a group of like-minded friends. Each assumed a classical name; his was Julius Pomponius Laetus, or Laetus. Prominent members were humanists with neo-pagan, epicurean interests, such as Bartolomeo Platina and Filippo Buonaccorsi. Rome was rife with political intrigue fomented by Roman barons and neighbouring princes, and Paul II (1464–71) arrested Pomponio and Academy leaders for irreligion, immorality, and conspiring against the pope. The prisoners were tortured, but eventually released.

=== 16th and 17th centuries ===
The 16th-century region of Rome had many generally short-lived literary and aesthetic circles ("academies") inspired by the Renaissance. They included Siena's theatrical Accademia degli Intronati; the 1530 Academy of the vignaiuoli (vine-growers); the Academy della virtù (1538), founded by Claudio Tolomei under the patronage of Ippolito de' Medici, and Academies of the intrepidi (1560), the animosi (1576) and the illuminati(1598). The Academy of Notti Vaticane (Vatican Nights) was founded by Charles Borromeo.

Seventeenth-century academies included the Accademia degli Umoristi, the Fantastici (1625) and the Ordinati, founded by Cardinal Dati and Giulio Strozzi. The academies of the Infecondi, the Occulti, the Deboli, the Aborigini, the Immobili, the Accademia Esquilina, and others were founded near the turn of the 18th century. The newer academies were public bodies (rather than a small circle of friends), modeled on the French Academy founded by Cardinal Richelieu.

=== 18th and 19th centuries ===
After the French Revolution and the restoration to Rome of the papal government, new academies were founded and old ones revived. The Accademia di Religione Cattolica and the Accademia Tiberina were founded under Pope Pius VII (1800–23), and the Immacolata Concezione in 1835. The Accademia Liturgica was reestablished in 1840, followed by the Accademia dei (Nuovi) Lincei seven years later.

== Selected academies ==
=== Pontificia Accademia degli Arcadi (1690) ===
This literary academy was founded by Giovanni Mario Crescimbeni and Gian Vincenzo Gravina in memory of Queen Christina of Sweden, who abdicated the Swedish crown in 1654, converted to Catholicism and moved to Rome, where she spent much of the rest of her life as an artistic and musical patron. The Pontificia Accademia degli Arcadi was established after her death in 1689, with Christina its symbolic head. The academy existed for two hundred years.

=== Accademia Filarmonica ===
The Accademia Filarmonica Romana was founded in 1821 for the study and practice of music.

=== Accademia Nazionale di Santa Cecilia ===
The Accademia Nazionale di Santa Cecilia, or Accademia di Musica, is a school of music founded in 1570 by Giovanni Pierluigi da Palestrina and Nanini which was designated by Pope Gregory XIII as a confraternity (or congregation) in 1583. Subsequent popes supported the institution; Pope Urban VIII decreed that no musical works be published without its permission, and no school of music (or singing) should be opened in a church without the written permission of its deputies. The restrictions were soon ignored; Pope Innocent XI allowed the congregation to admit foreign members in 1684, and women were admitted as members in 1774. The congregation was suspended for political reasons from 1799 to 1803, and again from 1809 to 1822. Its members have included Carissimi; Frescobaldi, the organist; Giuseppe Tartini, violinist and author of a new system of harmony; and pianist Muzio Clementi.

== Sources ==
- de Beer, Susanna (2008). "The Roman 'Academy' of Pomponio Leto: from an informal humanist network to the institution of a literary society". In Van Dixhoorn, Arjan; Sutch, Susie Speakman (eds.). The Reach of the Republic of Letters: Literary and Learned Societies in the Late Medieval and Early Modern Europe. Volume 168 of Brill's studies in intellectual history. Leiden: Brill. ISBN 978-90-04-16955-5.
