= Pietas Comunità Gentile =

Religious organization in Italy

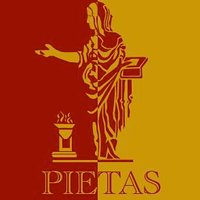
- Formation: 2020
- Headquarters: Rome
- Pontifex Maximus: Giuseppe Barbera
- Website: https://tradizioneromana.org/

Pietas Comunità Gentile, commonly referred to as Pietas, is a neo-pagan religious organization practicing a reconstructionist form of traditional Roman religion. Established in 2020, it operates as an extension of the Associazione Tradizionale Pietas (ATP), which has been active since the early 2000s .

Since the early 2000s, the Associazione Tradizionale Pietashas undertaken projects to reconstruct Roman temples and establish places of worship in Italy. across Italy.The association also applied for legal recognition as a religious body under Italian law. The Associazione Tradizionale Pietas (ATP) joined the European Congress of Ethnic Religions ECER in 2010. Following the establishment of Pietas Comunità Gentile in 2020, the organisation continued its participation in ECER . ATP's organisational development was influenced by comparable reconstructionist religious organisations elsewhere in Europe, including Thyrsus and YSEE in Greece.

Through the Associazione Tradizionale Pietas, members organised public and private religious ceremonies based on the revival of classical worship. These activities included annual celebrations of the Natale di Roma and the establishment of several temples and ritual spaces in Italy.

On 30 June 2023, representatives of Pietas participated in the annual meeting of the European Congress of Ethnic Religions (ECER), during which delegates from seventeen countries signed the Riga Declaration, a document advocating greater legal recognition of European ethnic religions.

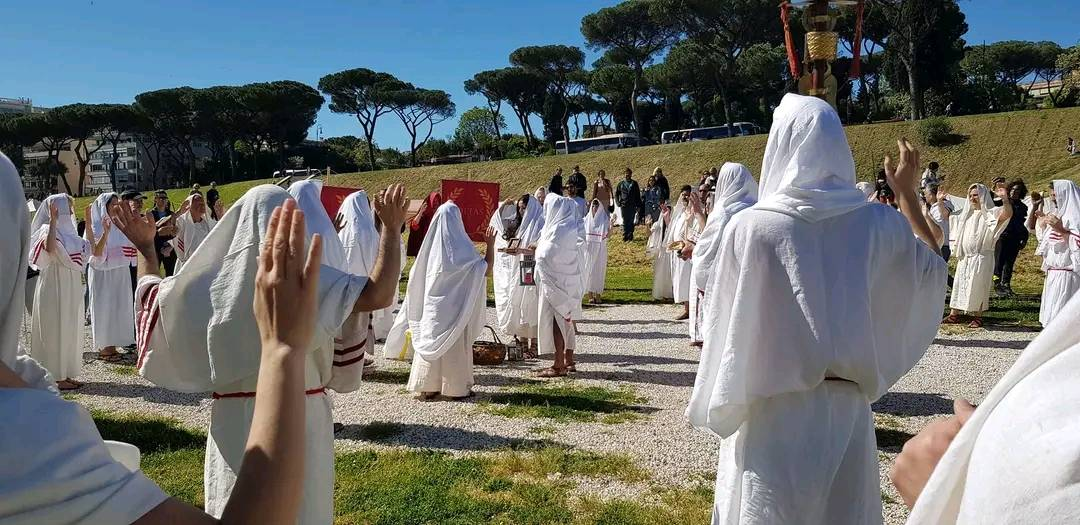
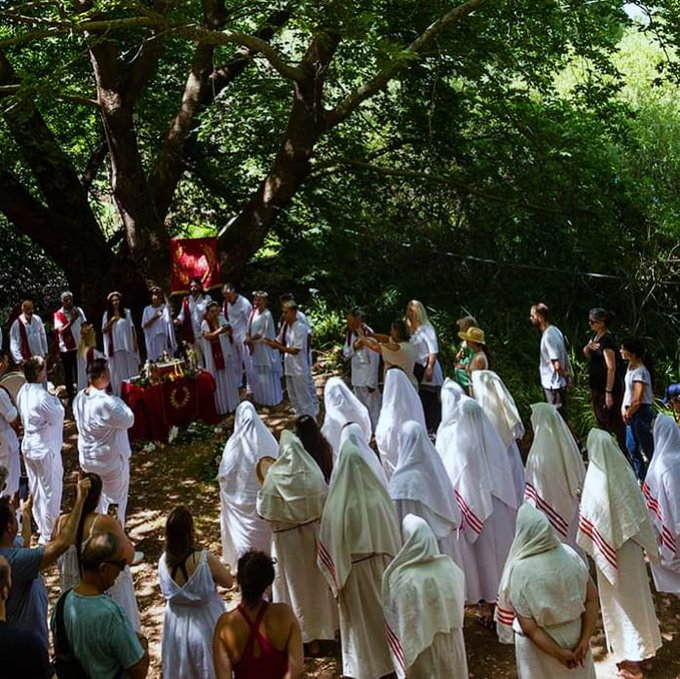
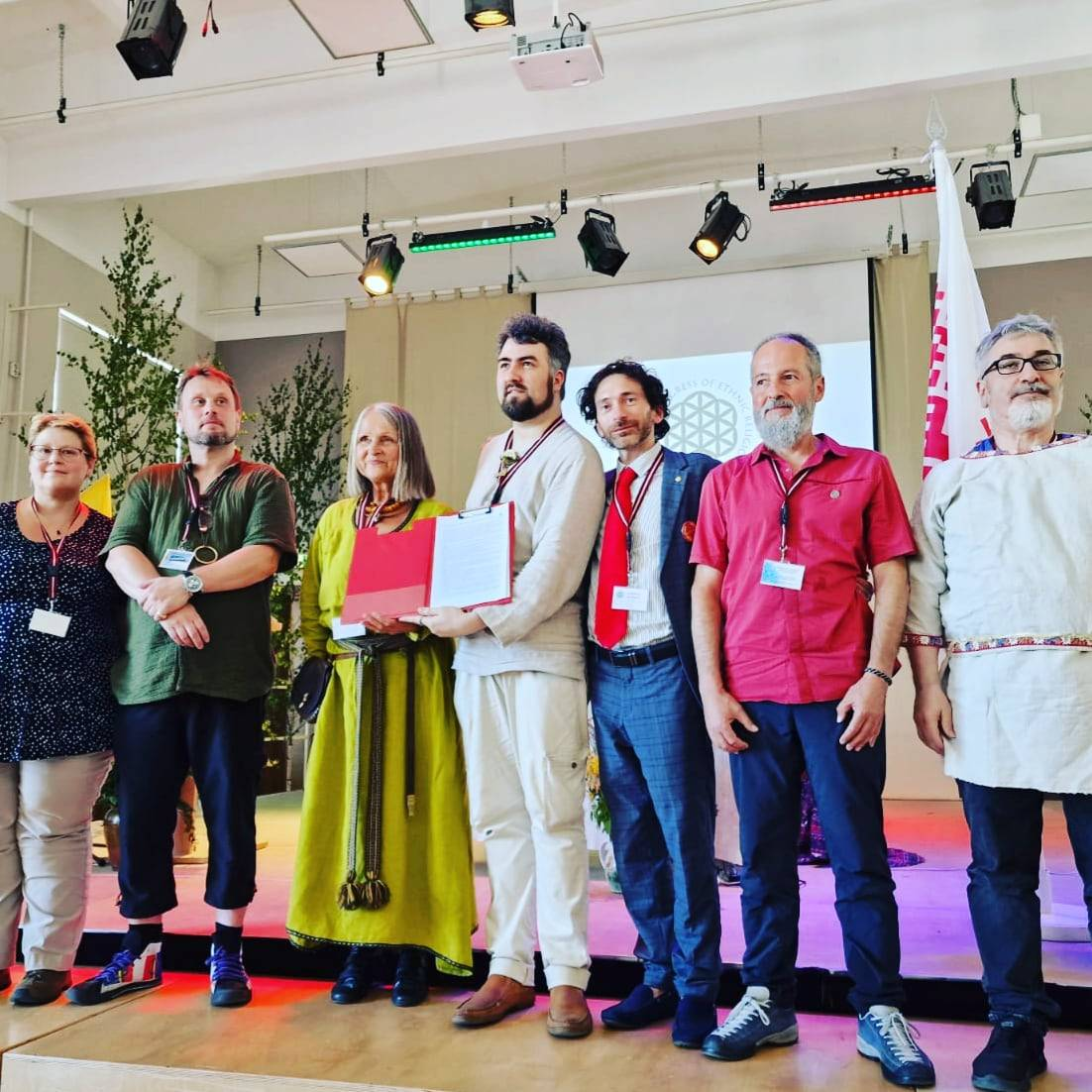
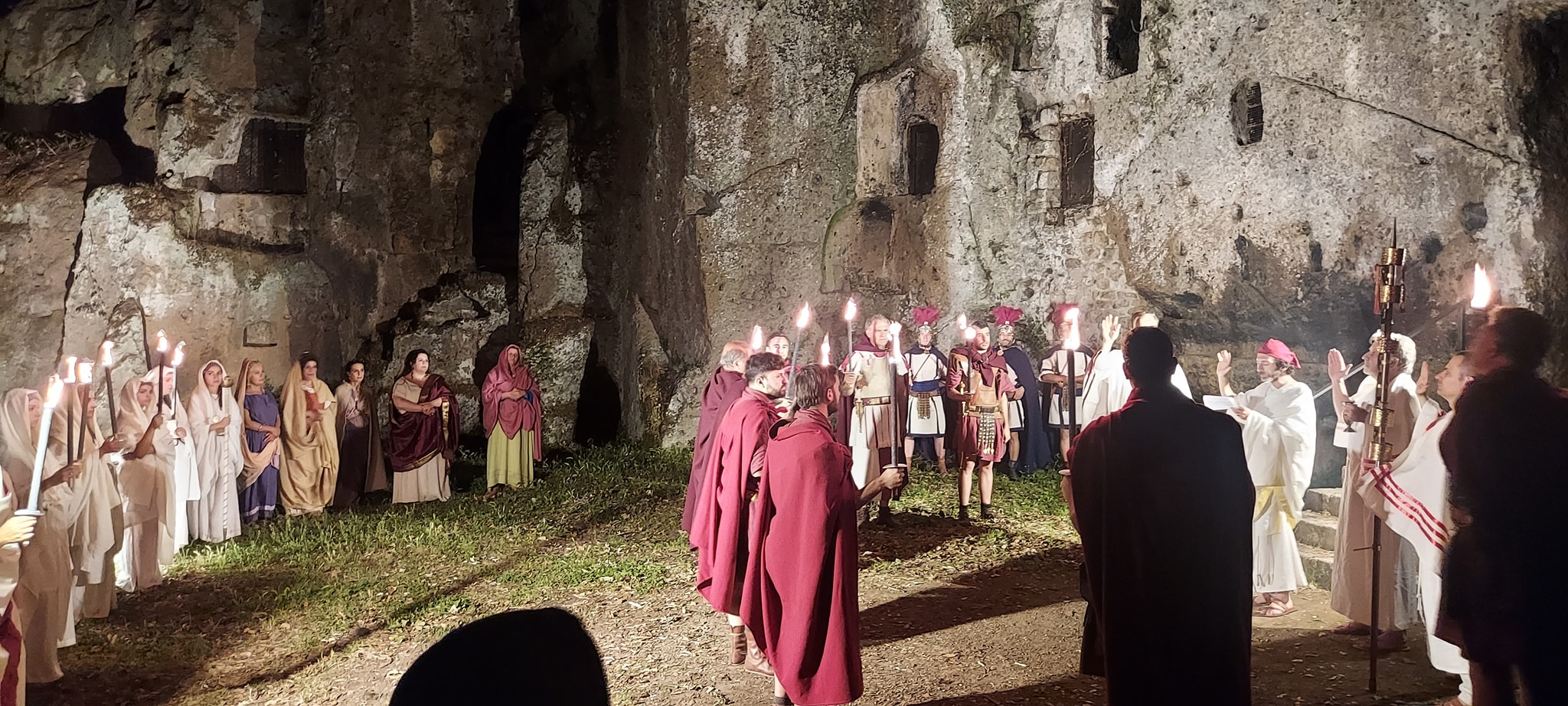
Clockwise from upper left: rite to the tutelary Gods of Rome during Natale di Roma, rite of the Summer solstice to Apollo in Greece with the participation of YSEE, Mithraic rite in the Mithrareum of Sutri, signing of the Riga Declaration.

In 2024, Pietas joined the Mediterraneum association together with the Greek Hellenic organisations Thyrsus and YSEE. According to the organisation, Mediterraneum promotes cooperation among groups representing Mediterranean ethnic religions.

Pietas organizes initiatives such as the Dionisiache, which are intended to maintain the contemporary continuity of ancient mystery cults. Held in the cloister of the former Convent of the Reformed Fathers in Pulsano, these events are conducted in collaboration with local institutions and the Pulsano Archaeological Museum. Dedicated to Artemis and Dionysus, the Dionisiache features a ritual reinterpretation of Roman religion that includes initiatory practices such as shamanic drumming, sacred chants, and nocturnal rites under the moon. The organization has also constructed two active temples in the Ionian region dedicated to Apollo and Minerva for the practice of cultus deorum and its esoteric archetypes.

== See also ==
- European Congress of Ethnic Religions
- Modern paganism
- Natale di Roma
- Neopaganism in Italy
- Reconstructionist Roman religion
