= Natale di Roma =

Festival celebrating the founding of Rome

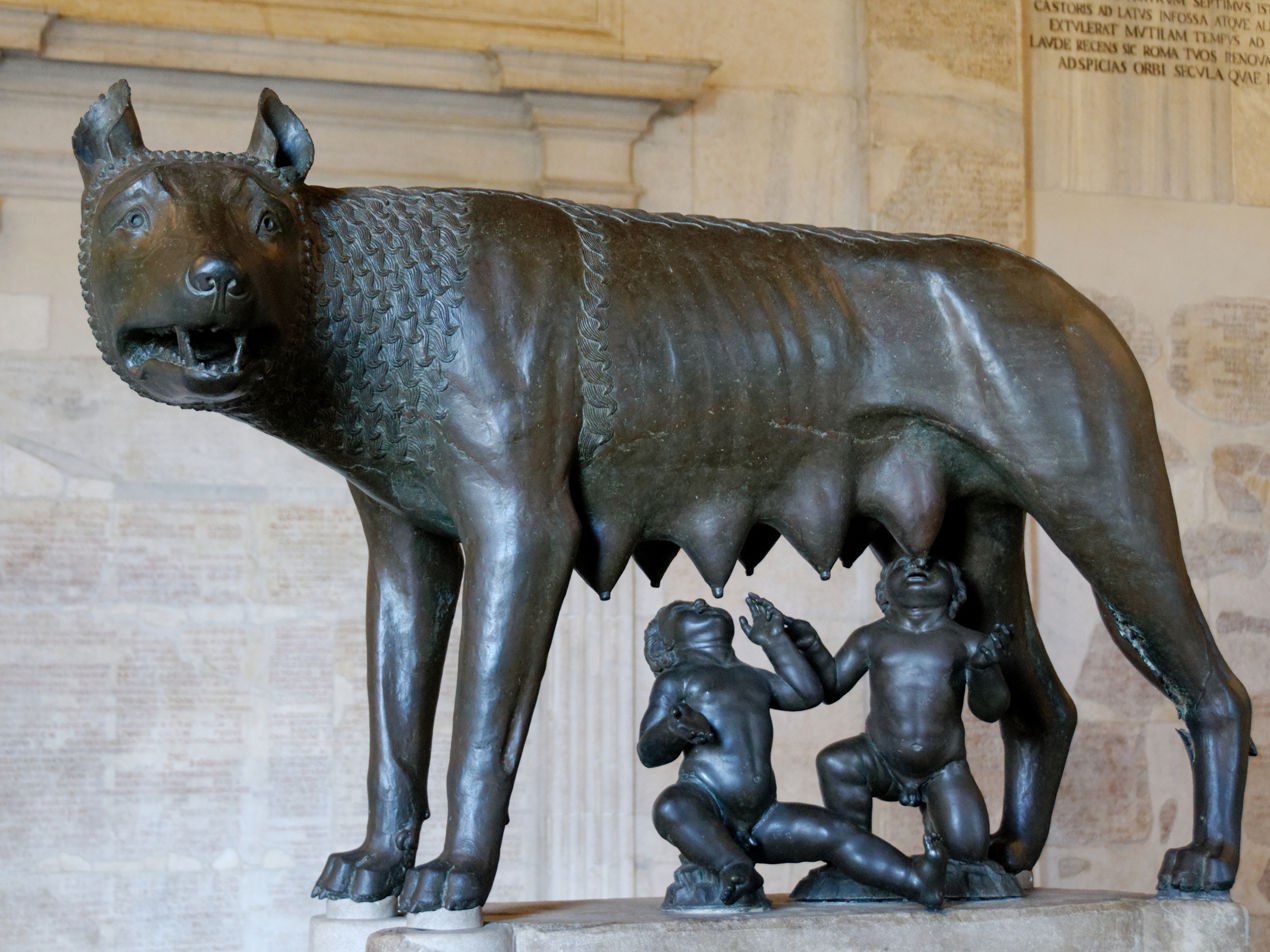
- The Capitoline Wolf, now illustrating the legend that a she-wolf nursed and sheltered Romulus and Remus after their mother's imprisonment in Alba Longa
- Observed by: Rome, Italy
- Type: Festival celebrating the founding of Rome
- Date: 21 April

Natale di Roma (lit. 'Birthday of Rome') is an annual festival held in Rome on April 21 to celebrate the legendary founding of the city. According to legend, Romulus is said to have founded the city of Rome on April 21, 753 BC. A Roman chronology derived its system, known by the Latin phrase Ab urbe condita, meaning 'from the founding of the City', from this date and counted the years from this presumed foundation. The dominant method of identifying years in Roman times, though, was to name the two consuls who held office that year.

== Celebrations of the festival in the age of Rome ==
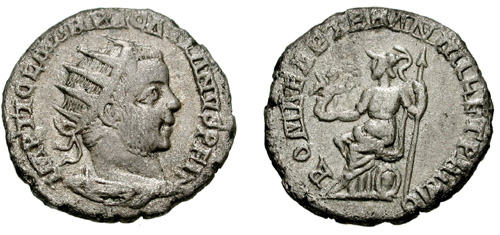
Antoninianus of Pacatianus, commemorating the invincible emperor and the 1001 years since the founding of Rome

The celebration of the anniversary of the Urbe as an element of imperial propaganda ultimately assigned fundamental importance to the question of the year of foundation.

Starting from Emperor Claudius, the method of calculating the City's age, proposed by Marcus Terentius Varro, prevailed over others. Claudius was the first to have the anniversary of Rome celebrated in 47, eight hundred years after the presumed date of foundation. In 147–148, Antoninus Pius initiated a similar celebration, and in 248, Philip the Arab celebrated the first millennium of Rome, along with the Ludi Saeculares (celebrated every hundred years), as Rome reached ten centuries. Coins have survived that celebrate the event. On a coin of the claimant to the throne Pacatianus, the number "1001" explicitly appears, indicating how the citizens of the Roman Empire understood they were at the beginning of a new era, Saeculum Novum. When the Roman Empire became Christian, in the following centuries, this millenary image was utilized in a more metaphysical sense.

During the imperial age, the feast of Saint Caesarius of Terracina (whose name Kaisarios probably predestined him to become the patron saint of Caesars) was established for the day April 21, the date of the foundation of Rome: this date acquired significant meaning, especially for the imperial propaganda it served; a pretext to celebrate the figure of the emperor and his patron saint.

== The festival after the fall of the Western Roman Empire ==
With the earlier spread and later adoption of Christianity as the state religion, along with the fall of the Western Roman Empire and the subsequent invasions, migrations, and conquests by barbarian populations, Rome, like everything that was its empire, saw the disappearance of many of its customs and traditions, including many of its festivals.

=== During the Renaissance ===
The Roman Academy of Pomponio Leto (a student of the pagan theologian Gemistus Pletho) soon became a circle of literati devoted to classical antiquity, even aiming to restore the ancient Roman religion (a unique project in the context of 15th-century humanism, indicating a certain subversive inclination). This seems to have taken place within the Academy itself, where they ritually celebrated the birthday of Rome (April 21) and where Leto had restored the Pontifex Maximus.

This is also seemingly confirmed by some inscriptions discovered in the 19th century in the Roman catacombs, where the names of the members of the Roman Academy are found alongside inscriptions encouraging debauchery. Pomponio Leto is called Pontifex Maximus and Pantagathus, meaning priest.

=== During the Risorgimento ===
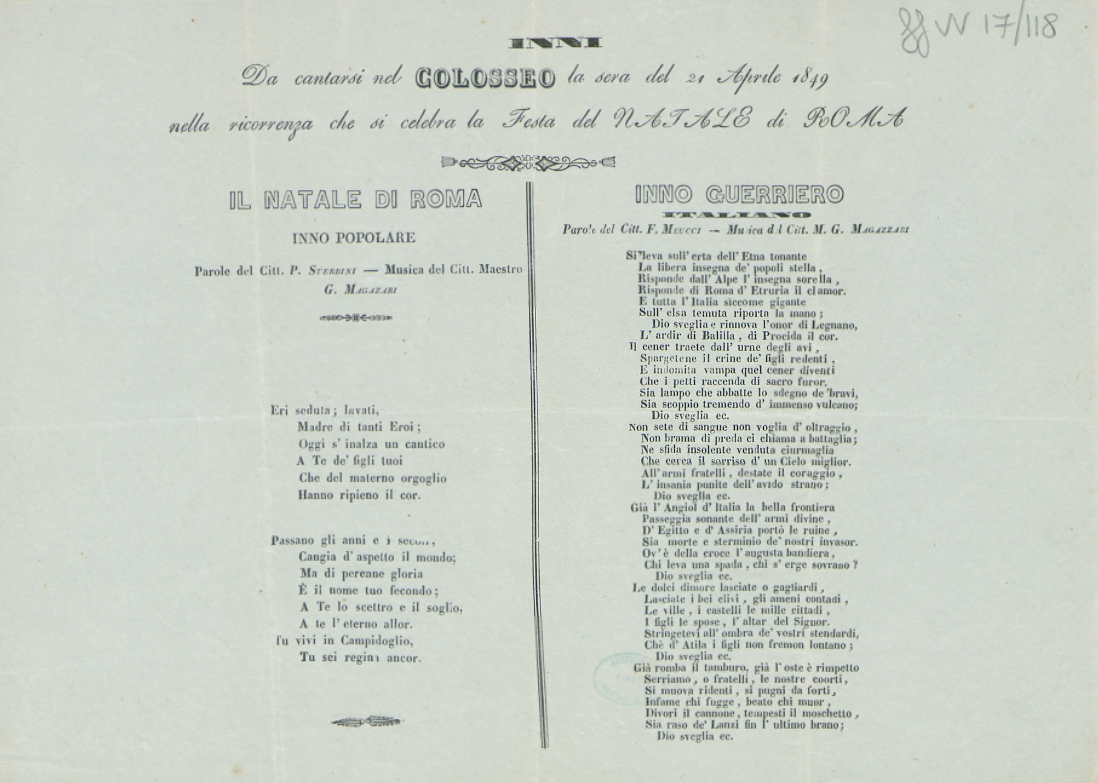
Hymns to be sung in the Colosseum on the Evening of April 21, 1849, on the occasion of the celebration of the Natale di Roma

Some of these were recovered by Humanism, but it was with the advent of the Risorgimento that the celebration of Natale di Roma was restored as a "tradition". The most revolutionary among the Mazzinians, Garibaldians, and some liberals celebrated the event, for instance, in the spring of 1849, when Rome, having recently become a free Republic that had overthrown the temporal power of the Pope, fought for survival. It is said that a meal was held in the Forums with toasts for the presumed foundation of the Urbe by Romulus and the refounding (liberation) by the revolutionaries themselves. Francesco Sturbinetti delivered one of the most heartfelt speeches.

=== During the Fascist era ===
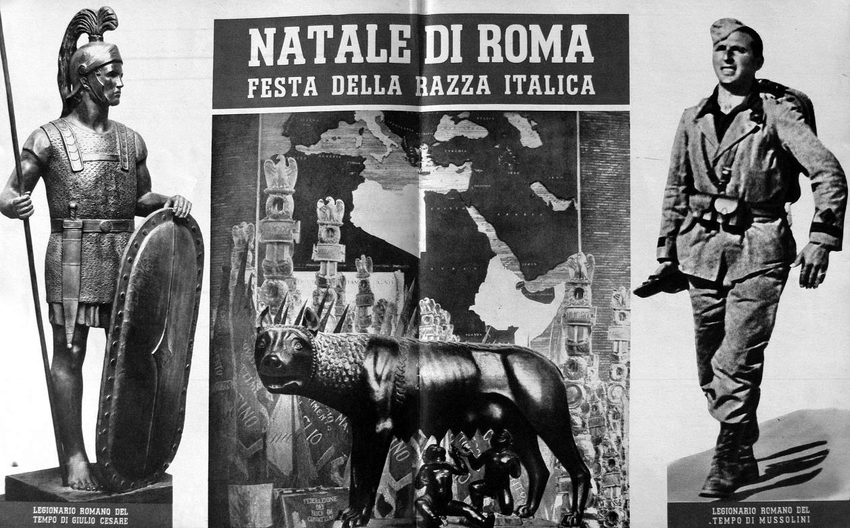
"Natale di Roma. Celebration of the Italic race"; from the magazine La Difesa della Razza

On April 3, 1921, during a speech in Bologna, the then leader of the Italian Fascist Movement, Benito Mussolini, proclaimed the anniversary of the founding of Rome as an official holiday of fascism. This decision was commented on by Antonio Gramsci as fascism's attempt to naturalize its role in Italian history, through the claim to Roman origins. In the document that sanctioned the national-fascist fusion between the Italian Nationalist Association and the National Fascist Party, signed on March 16, 1923, representatives of the two political forces established to celebrate the unifying agreement with a manifesto containing an appeal for national unity, to be posted in all Italian cities on the evening of April 20, the eve of Natale di Roma, a day "signifying the occurred rebirth of Roman greatness".

On the same April 19, a draft decree-law proposed by President Benito Mussolini was approved by the Council of Ministers, abolishing the holiday on May 1 and fixing the celebration of Labor Day on April 21, Natale di Roma. It was the first celebration instituted by Mussolini's government, which, starting from April 21, 1924, became a national holiday, named "Natale di Roma - Labor Day". This decree was repealed in 1945, restoring Labor Day to May 1.

=== Italian Republic ===
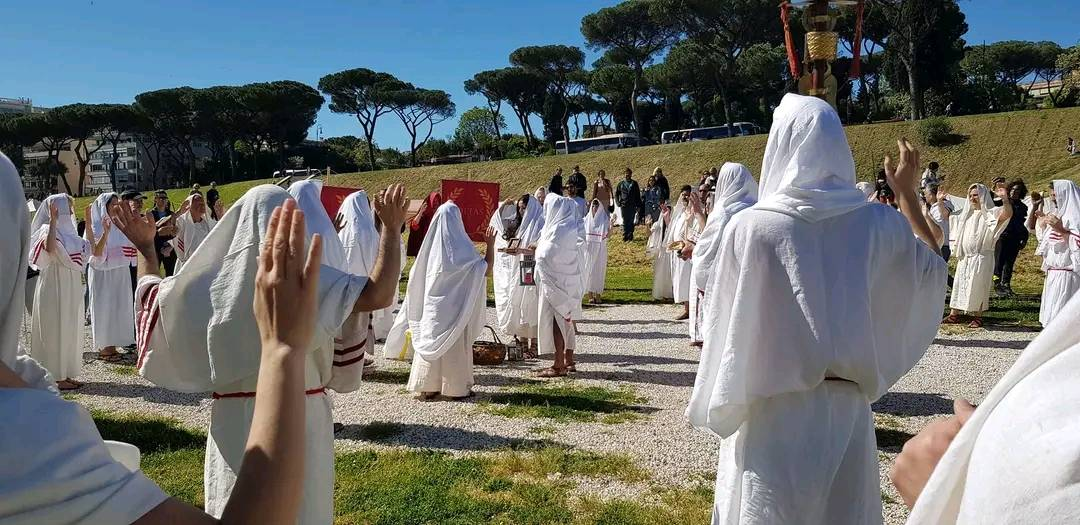
Pietas Comunità Gentile officiating the rite to the tutalary Numen of the city of Rome on the day of the Dies Natalis 2777

In the years of the Italian Republic, "Natale di Roma" has been celebrated with conferences and historical reenactments. In recent years, this event has regained significance, leading Italian institutions to recognize it more. Associations such as the "Gruppo Storico Romano" (GSR) and Pietas Comunità Gentile have contributed to organizing the event through historical reenactments and religious events with the affiliated associations involved in the modern Roman religion. The Gruppo Storico Romano annually organizes a parade with participants in period costumes and representations of scenes from ancient life and celebrations that echo the religious rites of ancient Rome.

In 2024, the 2777th "Natale di Roma" was held, with the participation of Italian institutional representatives. During the event, a plan was announced to increase funding for historical reenactments and possible legislation aimed at regulating such celebrations to preserve and enhance cultural traditions. Additionally, the band of the Italian Army participated in the celebrations. Every year, organizations from across Europe come to celebrate this date, demonstrating the importance and international appeal of the event.

== See also ==
- Foundation of Rome
- Ab urbe condita
- Reconstructionist Roman religion
- Neopaganism in Italy

== Bibliography ==
- Plutarch, Life of Romulus
