= Julius Pomponius Laetus =

Italian humanist (1428–1498)

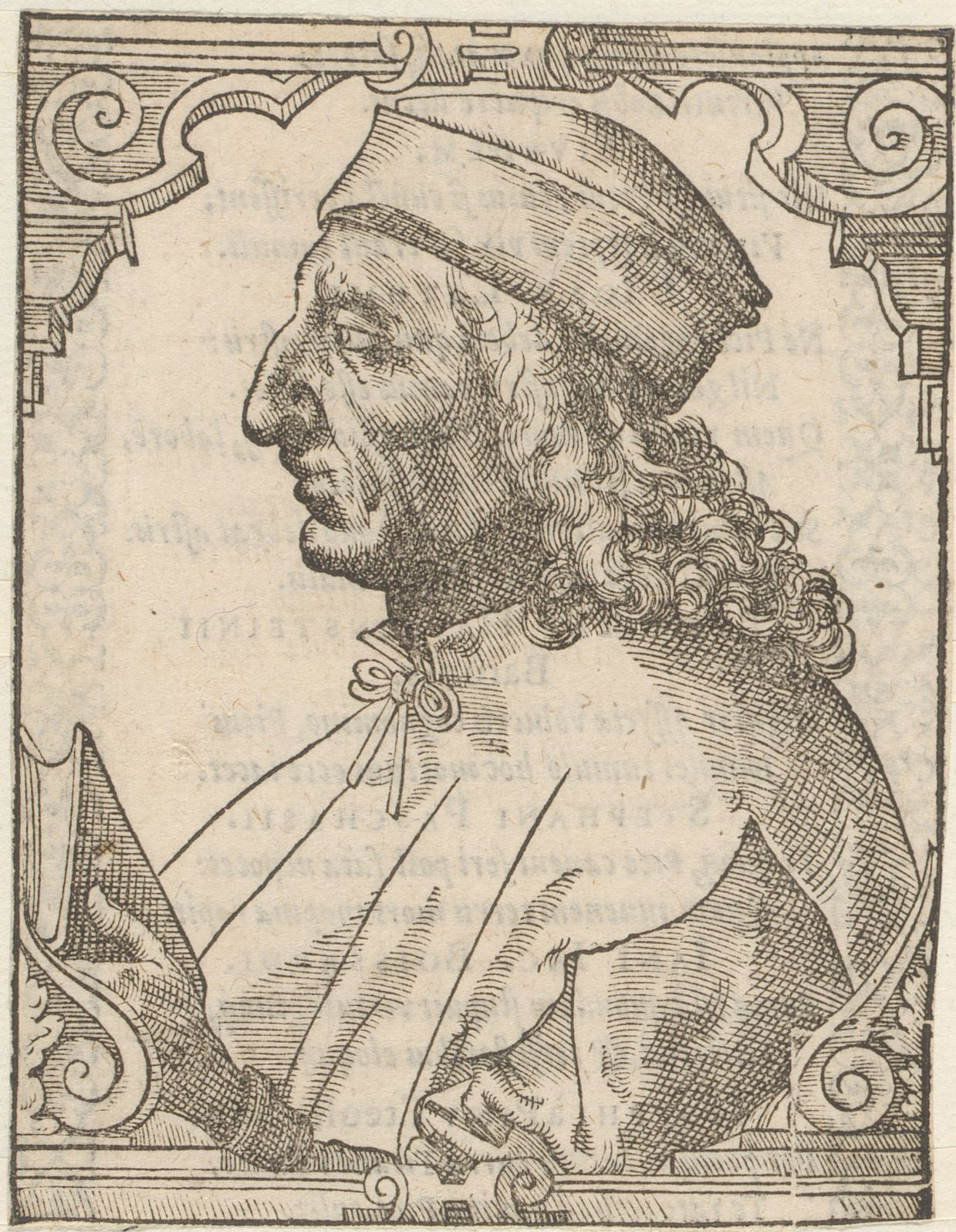
Portrait of Julius Pomponius Laetus by Tobias Stimmer

Julius Pomponius Laetus (1428 – 9 June 1498), also known as Giulio Pomponio Leto, was an Italian humanist.

== Background ==
Laetus was born at Teggiano, near Salerno, the illegitimate scion of the princely house of Sanseverino, the German historian Ludwig von Pastor reported. He studied at Rome under Lorenzo Valla, whom he succeeded in 1457 as professor of eloquence in the Gymnasium Romanum. About this time he founded an academy (Accademia Romana), the members of which adopted Greek and Latin names, and met at the house of Laetus on the Quirinal, which was filled with fragments and inscriptions and Roman coins collected by this early antiquarian, to discuss classical questions; they celebrated the birthday of Romulus. Its constitution resembled that of an ancient priestly college, and Laetus was styled pontifex maximus. Bartolomeo Platina and Filippo Buonaccorsi were among the most distinguished members of the circle, which also included Giovanni Sulpizio da Veroli, the editor of the first printed De architectura of Vitruvius and organizer of the first production of a Senecan tragedy mounted since Antiquity.

== Controversy surrounding his academy ==
In 1466, on his way to take up an appointment at the University of Rome, Laetus stopped for a sojourn in Venice. Here he was brought under investigation by the Council of Ten on suspicion of having seduced his students, whom he was said to have praised with excessive ardour in some Latin poems. Charged with sodomy, he was imprisoned.

At the same time in Rome, Pope Paul II began viewing Laetus's academy with suspicion, as savouring of paganism, heresy, and republicanism. In 1468 twenty of the academicians were arrested during Carnival on charges of conspiracy against the Pope. Laetus, who was still in Venice at the time the supposed conspiracy was discovered, was sent back to Rome, imprisoned and put to the torture, but refused to plead guilty to the charges of infidelity and immorality. For want of evidence, he was acquitted and allowed to resume his professorial duties; but it was forbidden to utter the name of the academy even in jest. He also decided not to set foot in Venice again, and for greater security, soon married.

In the meantime, Laetus received from Frederick III a dispensation to grant the laurel wreath: the young poet Publio Fausto Andrelini from Forlì (Italy) was the first to receive it.

Laetus continued to teach at the University of Rome until his death in 1498. Pope Sixtus IV permitted the resumption of the Academy meetings, which continued to be held until the sack of Rome in 1527. Laetus's importance in cultural history lies mostly in his role as a teacher. On his death he was buried in the church of San Salvatore in Lauro in Rome.

== Significance ==
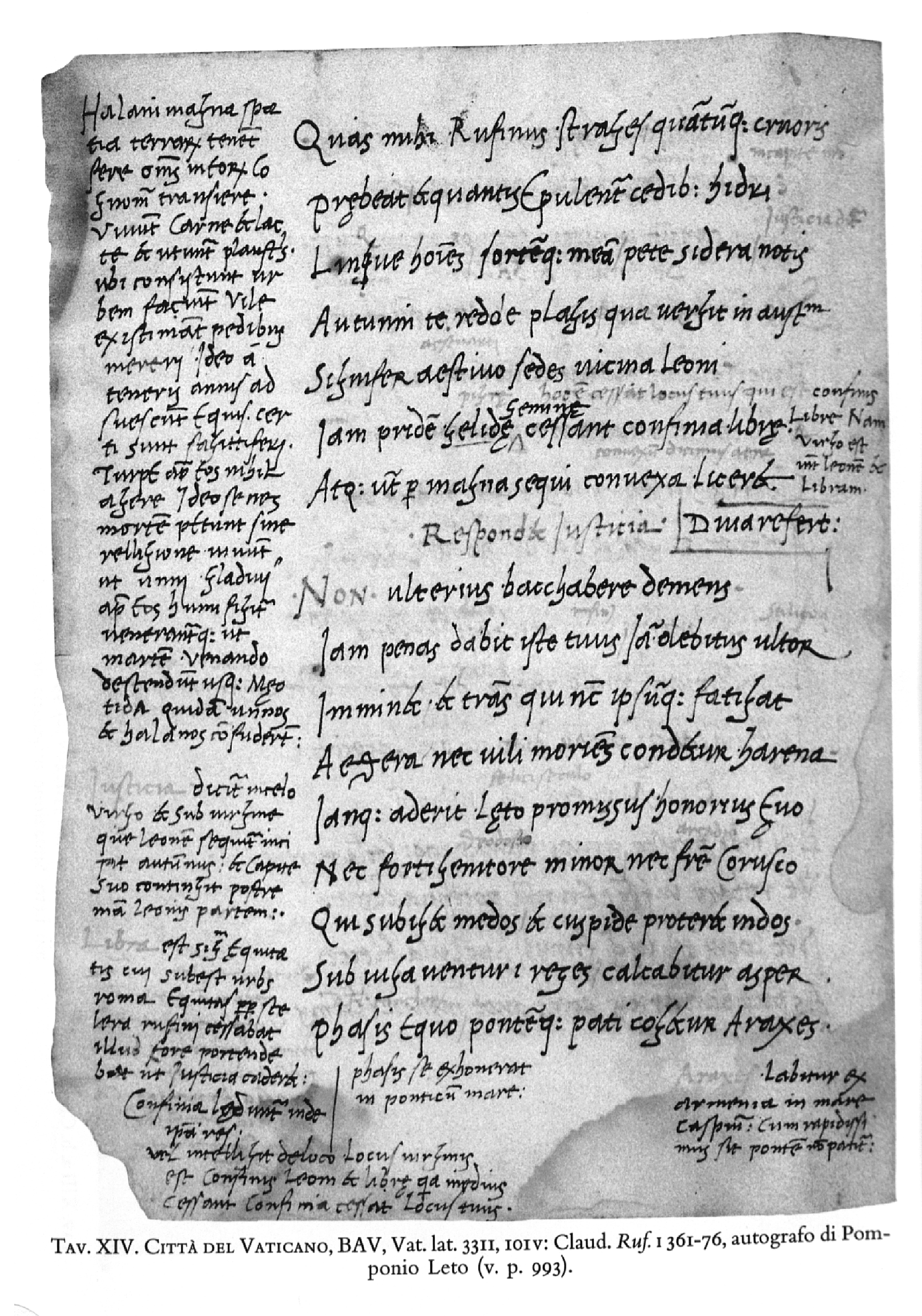
Manuscript of Claudian, In Rufinum 1361–1376, in Pomponius' handwriting with his commentary

Laetus, who has been called the first head of a philological school, was extraordinarily successful as a teacher; he said that he expected, like Socrates and Christ, to live on through his pupils, some of whom were many of the most famous scholars of the period. Among those put under his charge to be educated were Alexander Farnese, later pope Paul III. His works, written in sophisticated classicizing Latin, were published in a collected form (Opera Pomponii Laeti varia, 1521). They contain treatises on the Roman magistrates, priests and lawyers, and a compendium of Roman history from the death of the younger Gordian to the time of Justin III. Laetus also wrote commentaries on classical authors, and promoted the publication of the editio princeps of Virgil at Rome in 1469.
