= Caetani (surname) =

Caetani is a surname. Notable people with this surname include:

- Caetani, any member of the Italian noble family, closely linked to the papacy

13-17th century

- Benedetto Caetani, the Pope Boniface VIII (1294–1303)
- Benedetto II Caetani (died 1296), Italian cardinal of the Roman Catholic Church
- Onorato I Caetani (c. 1336–1400), Italian nobleman, Count of Fondi and Great Conestable of the Kingdom of Naples
- Antonio Caetani (seniore) (1360–1412), Italian Roman Catholic cardinal
- Niccolò Caetani (1526–1585), Italian Roman Catholic cardinal and bishop of Conza
- Antonio Caetani (iuniore) (1566–1624), Italian Roman Catholic cardinal
- Bonifazio Caetani (1567–1617), Italian Roman Catholic cardinal
- Enrico Caetani (1550–1599), Italian Cardinal of the Roman Catholic Church
- Camillo Caetani (or Gaetano) (1552–1603), Italian aristocrat and Papal diplomat
- Francesco Caetani (1594–1683), Duke of Sermoneta and Viceroy
- Luigi Caetani (1595–1642), Italian Cardinal of the Roman Catholic Church
- Francesco Caetani, 8th Duke of Sermoneta (1613–1683), Italian nobleman

18-21st century

- Onorato Caetani (1742-1797), Italian scholar and Principal of the Accademia degli Incolti, located in Rome
- Michelangelo Caetani, (1804–1882), Italian scholar, Duke of Sermoneta and Prince of Teano
- Ersilia Caetani Lovatelli (1840–1912), Italian art historian, cultural historian and archaeologist
- Onorato Caetani (1842–1917), Italian politician
- Leone Caetani, Duke of Sermoneta (1869–1935), Italian scholar, politician and historian, known also as Prince Caetani
- Gelasio Caetani (1877–1934), Italian nobleman and diplomat
- Vittoria Colonna Caetani (1880–1954), Italian writer, best known for Memoire (translated Things Past)
- Marguerite Caetani (1840–1963), Princess of Bassiano, American-born publisher, journalist, art collector and patron of the arts
- Sveva Caetani (1917–1994), Italian-Canadian artist
- Oleg Caetani (born 1956), Italian conductor

== See also ==
- Caetano (disambiguation)
- Gaetani (disambiguation)
