= Things Past =

Things Past may refer to:

- Things Past (Star Trek: Deep Space Nine), an episode of the television series
- Things Past (Malcolm Muggeridge), a 1978 anthology by Malcolm Muggeridge
- Things Past, a 1944 novel by Michael Sadleir
- Things Past, a 1929 memoir by Vittoria Colonna, Duchess of Sermoneta

== See also ==
- Remembrance of Things Past (À la recherche du temps perdu), a 1913–1927 novel by Marcel Proust
