= Raimonda (given name) =

Gražvydas
- Gender: Female
- Language: Lithuanian

Origin
- Region of origin: Lithuania

Other names
- Related names: Raimondas (masculine form)

Raimonda is a predominantly Lithuanian feminine given name. Individuals with the name Raimonda include:

- Raimonda Bložytė (born 1987), Lithuanian footballer
- Raimonda Gaetani (born 1942), Italian stage set and costume designer
- Raimonda Murmokaitė (born 1959), Lithuanian diplomat
