= Gaetani =

Gaetani may refer to:

- Inhabitants of the Italian city of Gaeta (Lazio)
- Caetani, an Italian noble family
- Filippo Gaetani (born 1964), Italian-born musician
- Ottavio Gaetani (1566–1620), Italian Jesuit and historian
- Pietro Gaetani (died 1500), Roman Catholic prelate
- Raimonda Gaetani (born 1942), Italian costume designer
- Romina Gaetani (born 1977), Argentine actress

== See also ==
- Benedetto Gaetani (disambiguation)
- Caetani (surname)
- Jan DeGaetani
