= San Gaetano =

San Gaetano may refer to:

- Saint Cajetan, Italian Catholic priest and religious reformer, co-founder of the Theatine
- San Gaetano, Brescia, church in Brescia, Italy
- San Gaetano, Florence, Baroque church in Florence, Italy
- San Gaetano, Padua, church in Padua, Italy
- San Gaetano, Vicenza, church in Padua, Italy
- San Gaetano alle Grotte, Catania, church in Vicenza, Italy
- San Gaetano alla Marina, Catania, Roman Catholic parish church in Catania, Italy
- San Gaetano di Thiene, Siena, church in Siena, Italy

== See also ==
- Gaetano (disambiguation)
