= Gaetano (disambiguation) =

Gaetano is an Italian masculine given name.

Gaetano may also refer to:

- Gaetano (surname), an Italian surname
- An inhabitant of Gaeta, Italy
- Scipione Pulzone (1544–1598), Neapolitan painter also known as "Il Gaetano"
- Gaetano, a 2015 single by Calcutta

== See also ==
- Gaetani (disambiguation)
- San Gaetano (disambiguation)
