= Micromosaicism =

Micromosaicism may refer to:

- Micromosaic, a piece of art
- Low-level genetic mosaicism
