= Benedetto Caetani =

Benedetto Caetani (or Gaetani) may refer to:

- Pope Boniface VIII, born Benedetto Caetani (died 1303)
- Benedetto Caetani (died 1296), cardinal, nephew of Boniface VIII
- Benedict of Porto e Santa Rufina (died 1216), cardinal, sometimes called Caetani

== See also ==
- Caetani (surname)
