= The Exaltation of the Flower =

Ancient Greek marble fragment

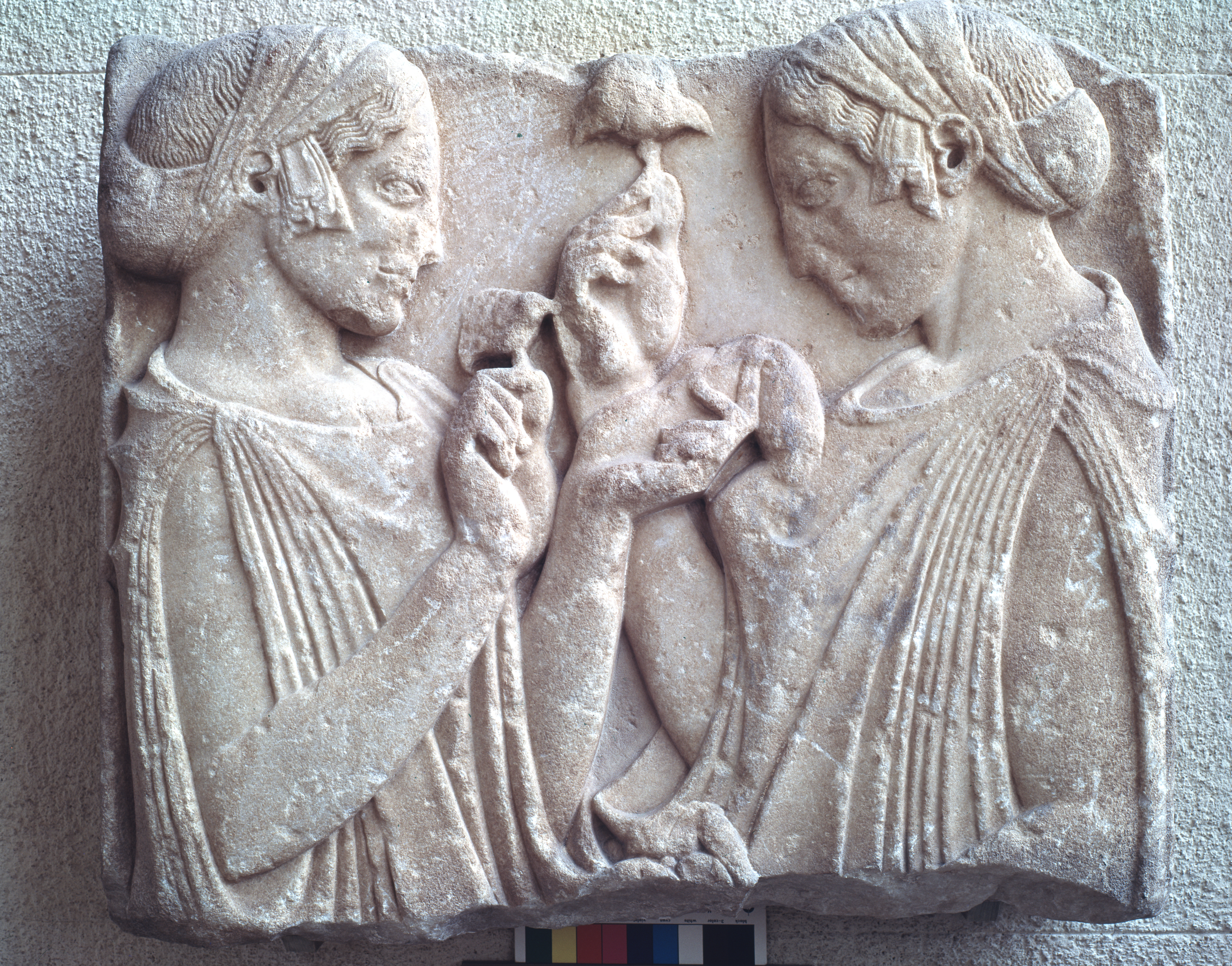
- Artist: Unknown Greek artist
- Year: c. 470–460 BCE
- Type: Parian marble
- Dimensions: Height: 56.5 cm (22.2 in). Width: 67 cm (26.4 in). Depth: 14 cm (5.5 in).
- Condition: Fragment
- Location: Louvre, Paris

The Exaltation of the Flower (L'Exaltation de la Fleur) is the modern title given to an early Classical Greek marble fragment of a funerary stele from the 5th century BCE. It was discovered in 1861 by Léon Heuzey and Honoré Daumet at a church in Farsala, Thessaly, Greece. Carved in bas-relief in the severe style, the extant upper fragment of the marble relief stele depicts two women holding what appear to be flowers or other objects. The work is held by the Louvre museum in the Department of Greek, Etruscan, and Roman Antiquities (inv. Ma 701).

== Background ==
French archaeologist and historian Léon Heuzey began working with the French School at Athens in Greece at the age of 20 in 1851. He made his most famous discovery of that period in the town of Farsala, a city in southern Thessaly. In antiquity, the area was named Pharsalos, and became known for the Battle of Pharsalus in 48 BCE, where Julius Caesar defeated Pompey during the Great Roman Civil War.

Heuzey and the architect Honoré Daumet were involved in an official mission to collect objects related to Caesar's campaigns; they also were interested in other artifacts unrelated to their work. In 1861, they found this marble bas-relief embedded in the walls of a church in the neighborhood of Paleo-Loutro in Farsala and named it The Exaltation of the Flower. Heuzey was informed that the stone was originally discovered in a garden, close to another stone that was not recovered. Heuzey purchased the stone and had it sent to the Louvre in Paris. Back in France, Heuzy would become curator of the Louvre, where he would retire in 1908.

== Description ==
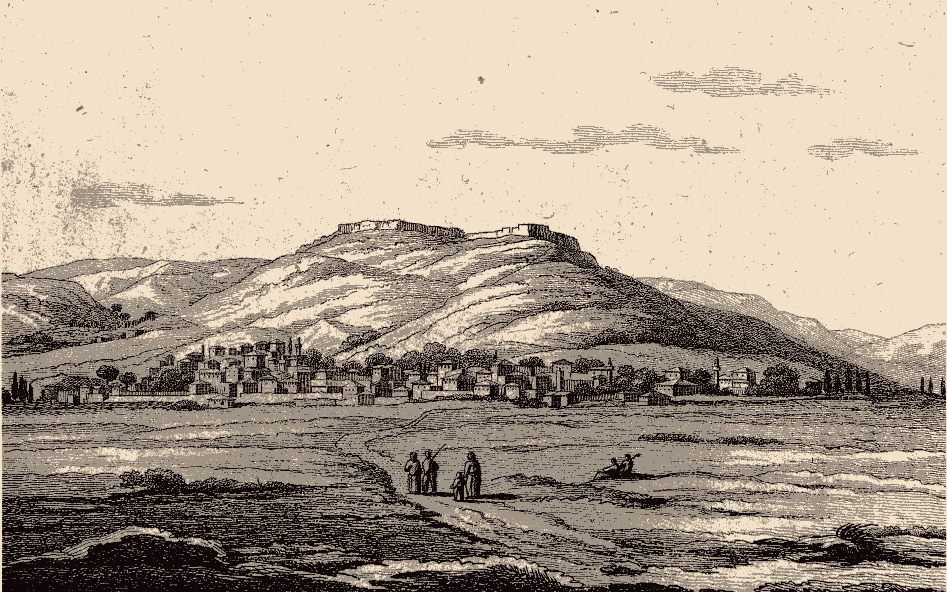
Farsala c. early 19th century

A precise description and interpretation of the work has remained elusive since its initial discovery in the 19th century. Scholars agree on some aspects and disagree on others. British Greek art scholar Martin Robertson notes that both women can be seen wearing the tubular peplos garment common to the Classical period. According to the descriptive text found in the Atlas database of the exhibited works of art at the Louvre, the women also are wearing a kekryphalos, a hairnet in the Greco-Roman hairstyle, and appear to hold a type of flower, perhaps poppy or pomegranate. One of the women in the stele carries what resembles a bag, presumed to be carrying seeds in the interpretation.

== Analysis ==
In his 1868 paper, Heuzey argued that the images in the stele suggested the goddesses Persephone (Kore) and Demeter, referring to the cult of Kore and the legend of Demeter found in the Homeric Hymns. French archaeologist and art historian Maxime Collignon explained, "Heuzey believes that this monument refers to the cultus of Core, daughter of Demeter, a divinity suggesting in Greek legend the ephemeral but incessantly recurring bloom of nature." French archaeologist Olivier Rayet (1847–1887) disagreed with the interpretation Heuzy offered. While Heuzey's perspective still has adherents, it has largely fallen out of favor among art historians. According to the Perseus Project at Tufts University, "It is now generally agreed ... that the figures represented are mortals rather than goddesses."

German archaeologist Heinrich Brunn believed the decorative qualities of the Pharsalos stele originated in Asia Minor. Following this line of reasoning, Scottish archaeologist Alexander Stuart Murray compared the facial features of the stele, such as the eyes, lips, and nose, to similar facial features found in the Harpy Tomb (480–470 BCE) relief from Xanthos in Lycia. American curator Edward Robinson notes the influence of the Ionic schools on this and other artwork from ancient Aeolia, now known as Thessaly: "It is now a question whether these works were done by local artists under this influence, or by Ionic artists who may have established themselves in Thessaly, as they did in other parts of Greece." The Ionian style's influence also may be seen in the depiction of the hair-net worn by the women in the relief.

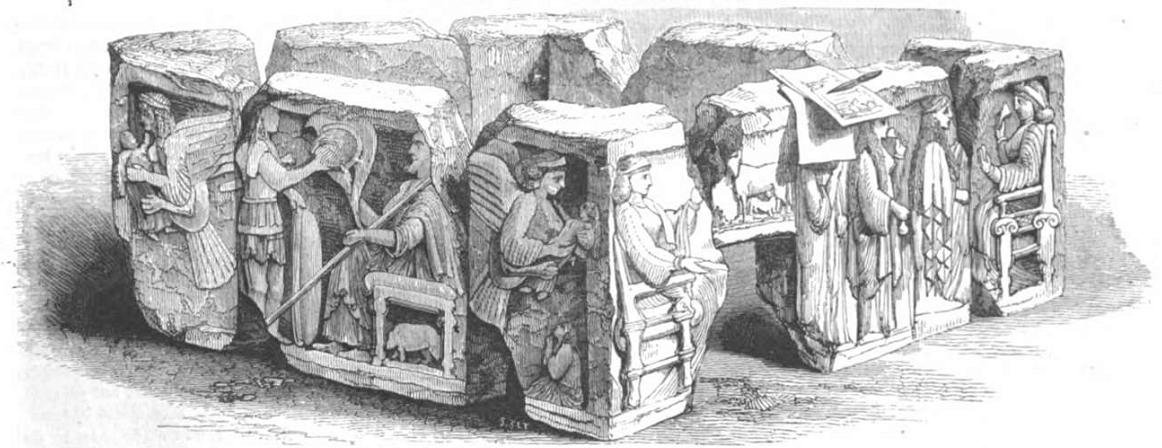
Reconstruction of the marble chamber from the Harpy Tomb

French scholar Charles Picard (1883–1965) argued that if the stele fragments were reconstructed, (Note: A scanned image hosted by the German Archaeological Institute (DAI) and the Archaeological Institute of the University of Cologne extrapolates the reconstruction of the missing bottom fragment. It is available here. For the main object record, see here.) the bottom missing fragment would have shown the figure on the left standing, and the one on the right seated:

Neither can the oblique trend of the drapery, belt-high in the silhouette (in profile) of the elder, be explained … without accepting that she was seated, her left forearm resting on her thigh. Only thus could the dice be handled. Only thus, moreover, can so extreme a slope in the pleats coming away from the shoulder, pleats that would have to fall vertically in a non-seated figure, become understandable. On the right, let it not be readily forgotten that all the pleats turn strongly forward, so that they pass the centerline of the stele, marked by the high, triumphant flower and the mingled group of hands. For the maiden on the left, although the cascade of pleats is generally much more direct—as appropriate to a standing posture—some of them, curiously arched, turn forward as well, for example at the left armhole. They can scarcely be understood without again invoking the supporting effect produced by the leg of the seated woman. The folds of Kore’s sleeve, which in 1939 I drew a little too short in the descent, carry on to Demeter’s lap, where they spread out.

German classical archaeologist Roland Hampe (1908–1981) disagreed with Picard's hypothesis, saying that the size of the stele should demonstrate that both women were standing, not sitting.

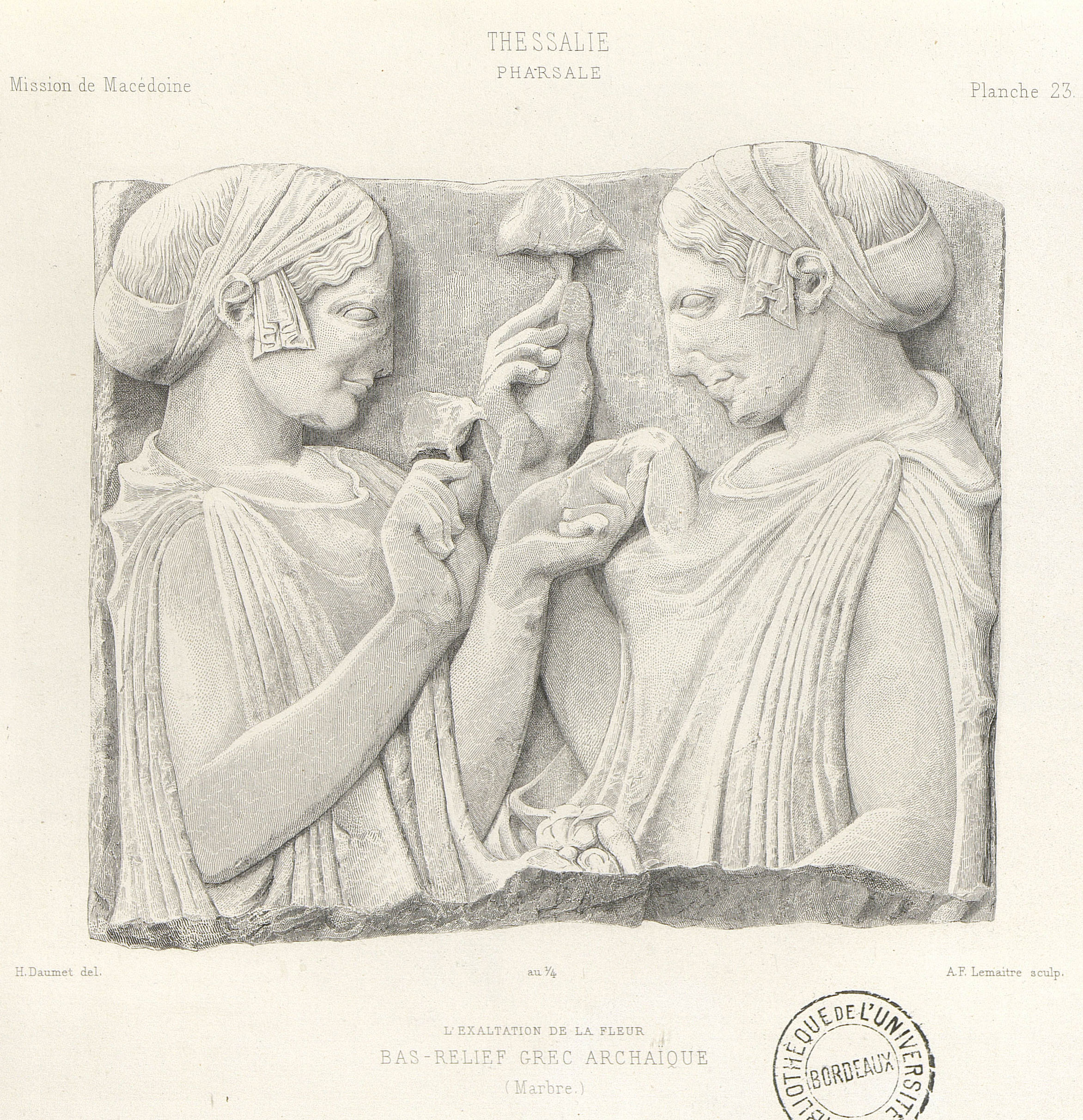
Mission Archéologique de Macédoine (1876), plate 23, drawn by Honoré Daumet

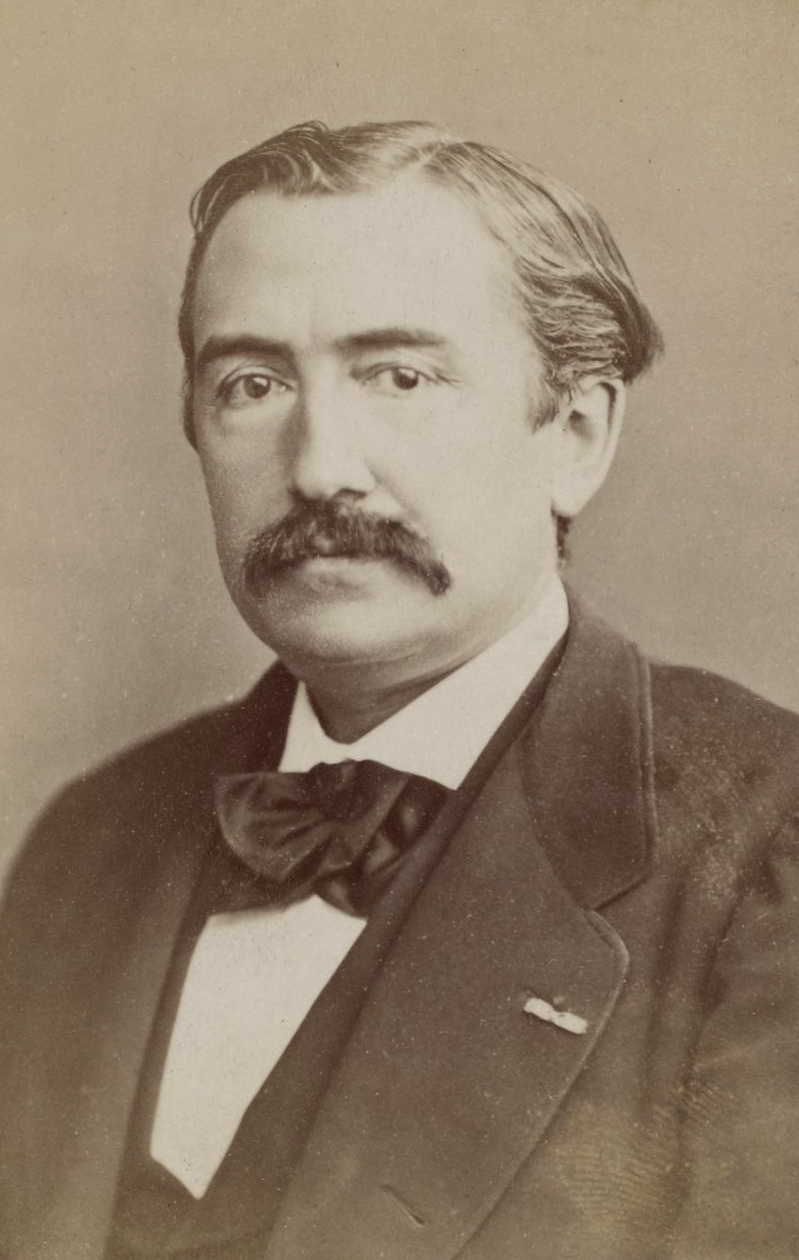
Léon Heuzey

== Flowers, fungi, or bones ==
It is generally agreed that the plants depicted in the stele fragment are either poppies or pomegranate flowers, however, classical archaeologists and historians of ancient Greek art discuss different species in the literature: German scholar Ernst Langlotz (1895–1978) thought that the women were holding a type of rose; Picard recognizes the symbolism of Demeter and Kore and identifies the flowers as a species of poppy, possibly the opium poppy, the Oriental poppy, or the Iranian poppy. Careful examination of the thick 'stems' fails to resemble that of the flowers. German scholar Eugen Petersen (1837–1919) proposed that the figures were holding knucklebones (talus bones from goats or sheep used to play the game of jacks) in their left hand and roses in the right hand; Hampe argues that the stele depicts only knucklebones, not flowers.

In 1911, Greek scholar and archaeologist Rufus B. Richardson, formerly of the American School of Classical Studies at Athens, observed that what was being described as flowers in the relief, looked similar to mushrooms. English classicist Robert Graves and Italian ethnobotanist Giorgio Samorini both have referred to the fragment as evidence for the entheogen hypothesis, speculating that the significant items depicted in the work are a type of psychoactive mushroom that was used in the Eleusinian Mysteries. Graves even featured the image as the cover of one edition of The Greek Myths, noting that although it might be depicted in artwork, it would remain unnamed in texts because of its sacredness. American classicist Carl A. P. Ruck has made similar arguments. Although the entheogen hypothesis is controversial and generally rejected by mainstream scholarship, (Note: Samorini (1998) writes: "This bas-relief takes us to the very heart of the 'Eleusinian question,' its mysteries, and the controversial issue of the Eleusinian entheogen’s psychopharmacology. Researchers have recently cast doubts on and rejected the hypothesis put forward by Wasson, Hofmann & Ruck in 1978 that presents ergot and its visionary alkaloids as the psycho-pharmacological key to the Eleusinian Mysteries...") in a review of Hampe's Die Stele aus Pharsalos im Louvre (1951), Picard notes that "one may be increasingly reminded that Pharsalos was indeed an Eleusinian center".

== Alternate titles ==
The work is referred to by many different titles in contemporary literature. These include:

- Adoration of the Flower
- Demeter and Kore Exalting the Flower
- Demeter and Persephone
- The Elevation of the Flower
- Maidens Enjoying Flowers
- Pharsalos Bas-Relief
- Pharsalos relief
- Relief of Demeter and Kore
- Stele of Pharsalos
- Stele of the Two Sisters
- The Uplifting of the Flower

== See also ==
- Lovatelli urn
