= Fortunato Pio Castellani =

Italian goldsmith and antiquarian seller

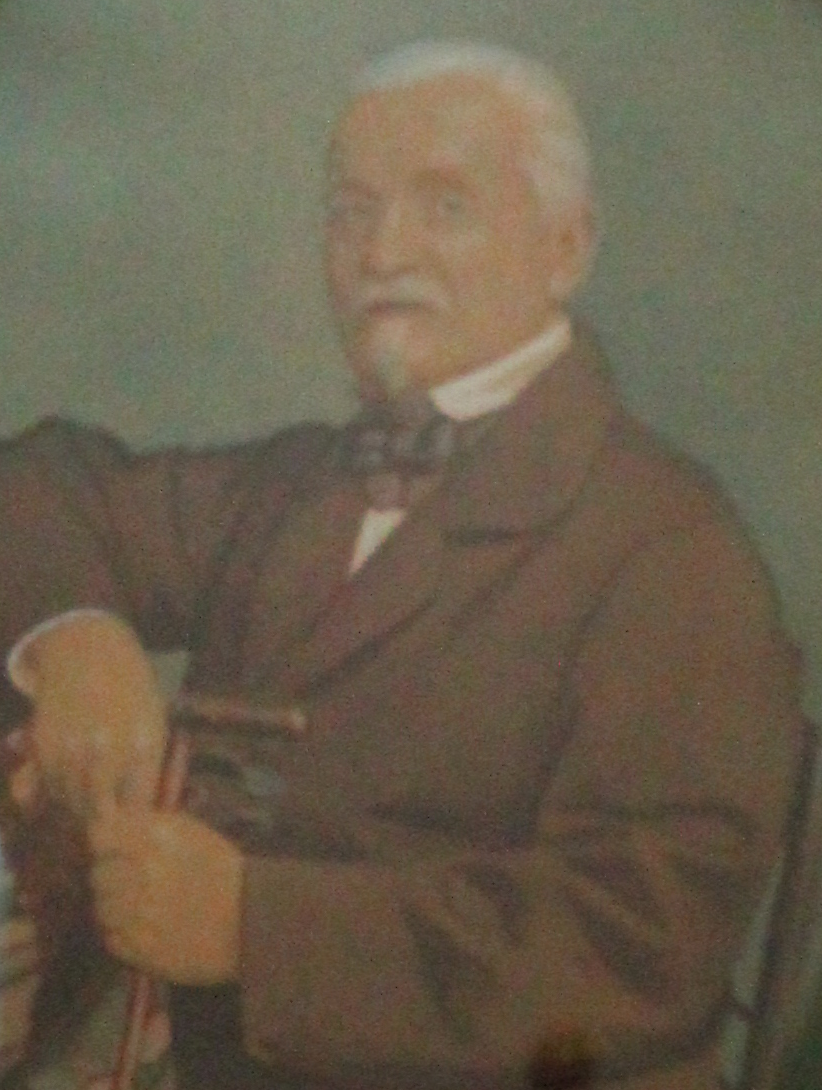
Ritratto di Fortunato Pio Castellani.

Fortunato Pio Castellani (6 May 1794 – 1 January 1865) was a 19th-century Italian jeweller and founder of Castellani, an Italian jewellery company.

Castellani opened his first shop in Rome in 1814. He specialised in recreating the jewellery of ancient craftsmen, particularly the Etruscans. Castellani based many of his designs directly on archaeological evidence and often incorporated intaglios, cameos and micromosaics into his jewellery. His work became very fashionable throughout 19th century Europe and his shop was frequented by grand tourists and aristocracy. The Castellani dynasty spanned three generations, and, were also noted antiquarians.

== Life ==
Castellani opened his first workshop in Rome in 1815. Initially, his designs reflected the fashions of the day and were generally based on French and English jewellery of the period. However, in the 1820s, Castellani began to develop the style for which he would become most famous. In collaboration with his friend and sponsor Michelangelo Caetani - later the Duke of Sermoneta and a noted archaeologist - Castellani began to draw inspiration from archaeological discoveries particularly those of the pre-Roman Etruscan culture. This collaboration introduced Castellani's jewelry to Roman nobility and helped expand his clientele throughout Italy and Europe.

Fortunato Pio Castellani developed a special chemical technique called "giallone" to reproduce the warm, deep yellow shades of ancient gold. He presented this innovation at a prestigious academy in Rome in 1826.

In 1836, archaeologists discovered the Regolini-Galassi tomb, a particularly important Etruscan find that yielded a large amount of beautifully preserved jewellery. Because of his expertise in the field and his connections with Caetani, Castellani was enlisted as an advisor on the excavation. Much of the jewellery excavated was decorated with granulation - tiny specks of gold applied to the surface. This technique was unknown to 19th century jewellers and Castellani was inspired by the discoveries to rediscover the lost art.

In the 1850s, Castellani passed management of the family business to his two sons Alessandro (1824–83) and Augusto (1829–1914) in whose hands it continued to flourish. The family were keen collectors and in addition to their jewellery business they dealt and restored antiquities extensively. Castellani's main shop was immediately adjacent to the Trevi Fountain, one of Rome's most prestigious locations, and incorporated a museum of the family's collection.
