= Leone Caetani =

Italian politician and scholar (1869–1935)

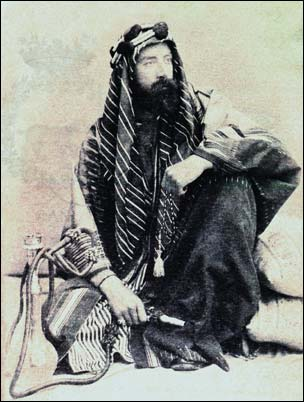
Photo of Leone Caetani taken in Egypt in 1888

Leone Caetani (September 12, 1869 – December 25, 1935), Duke of Sermoneta (also known as Prince Caetani), was an Italian scholar, politician, and historian of the Middle East.

Caetani is considered a pioneer in the application of the historical method to sources of the early Islamic traditions, which he subjected to minute historical and psychological analysis.

He was the father of Italian-Canadian visual artist Sveva Caetani.

== Life ==
Caetani was born in Rome into the prominent and wealthy Caetani family. His father Onorato Caetani, Prince of Teano and Duke of Sermoneta, was Italian Minister of Foreign Affairs in 1896 in the second di Rudini cabinet; his English mother, Ada Bootle Wilbraham, was a granddaughter of Edward Bootle Wilbraham, 1st Baron Skelmersdale. His paternal grandfather, Michelangelo, had married the Polish Countess Calixta Rzewuski, whose ancestor Wacław Seweryn Rzewuski had been a well-known Polish orientalist.

Caetani developed an interest in foreign languages at an early age. At 15, he began to study Sanskrit and Arabic on his own. Later he studied Oriental languages at the University of Rome, under Ignazio Guidi and Giacomo Lignana, with an intensive study of Arabic, Hebrew, Persian, Sanskrit and Syriac languages (and perhaps also Turkish). Caetani spent many years researching and traveling throughout the Muslim world, gathering material on a wide range of Islamic cultures from Tunisia, Algeria, Egypt, Syria, Turkey, Iraq, the Levant, the Sahara, India, Central Asia, and southern Russia. Later, one of his disciples was Giorgio Levi Della Vida. He became a corresponding member of the Accademia Nazionale dei Lincei in 1911 and a full member in 1919. Later, he left his rich library to the Lincei to create the Caetani foundation for Muslim studies.

Caetani also served as a deputy of the Italian Parliament (1909–1913), keeping a radical socialist stance. He married Vittoria Colonna Caetani of the Colonna, daughter of Marcantonio VI prince of Paliano, from whom he later separated; in 1917 he succeeded his father as Prince of Teano and Duke of Sermoneta.

After the end of his marriage and the rise of Fascism, in August 1921 Caetani decided to emigrate to Vernon, British Columbia, Canada, with his new partner Ofelia Fabiani and their daughter Sveva. He later became a Canadian citizen. In 1935, the Fascist regime stripped him of his Italian citizenship and expelled him from the Accademia dei Lincei; he died of throat cancer on December 24, 1935, in Vancouver, British Columbia. Leone Caetani is laid to rest in the Pleasant Valley Cemetery in Vernon, BC.

== Research ==
Caetani made extensive analysis of sources related to the origins of the Qur'an and Islamic thought between 1904 and 1926 during which he collected and arranged chronologically all known materials related to the origins of Islam. Caetani presented his critical analysis and conclusions regarding what he believed to be inconsistencies, contradictions, and variances in the Islamic sources in his ten-volume work Annali dell'Islam.

Caetani claimed that most of the early traditions of Islam could be dismissed as fabrications by later generations of authors. He also suggested that the Arab conquests during the formative era of Islam were driven not by religion but by material want and covetousness.

== The Esoteric-Pagan Environment ==
As historically documented, he was active in the Grand Council of the Sanhedrin of a Masonic Rite of Egyptian tradition in the Neapolitan context until 1910, the year of the death of Grand Master and Grand Hierophant Giustiniano Lebano. Afterwards, he gave rise to a "Romulean" reinterpretation of the doctrinal corpus of the Egyptian Rite, which resulted in a lineage involving the Hieronymus of Ekatlo Ecatlon, the Supreme Hierophant Pontiff of the supreme college, or Ammonian Sanhedrin, also known as N.R. Ottaviano. After his death, his daughter Sveva sent all documents related to the Order to Pasquale Del Pezzo, whom Caetani had appointed as regent.

It has been proposed that Caetani was identical to two mysterious figures who operated within the Roman pagan environment on the eve of the First World War.

The first of these individuals signed an article under the pseudonym Ekatlos, published in December 1929 in the final issue of the journal Krur, edited by Julius Evola. This article, titled The Great Footprint: the Scene and the Backdrop, revealed the actions of a group aiming to reestablish a connection with the Roman religion.

These actions included:

The discovery of an ancient Roman sceptre in a tomb during the Christmas season of 1913 (according to Del Ponte, it occurred on the night of the winter solstice, and the tomb was located along the Appian Way). The discovery was said to have been guided by a woman in the group who served as the "pupil," or medium between gods and men. The most accepted hypothesis identifies her as Cesarina Ribulsi (Turin, March 9, 1892 – Viterbo, 1963), though Camilla Calzone and Ofelia Fabiani have also been suggested.

The performance, over subsequent months, of rituals based on inscriptions written on the wrappings around the sceptre. These were intended to ensure Italy’s victory in the coming world conflict. According to Ekatlos’ testimony, the group witnessed visions during the rites, including appearances of ancient Roman heroes who foretold Italy’s entry into the war and its ultimate victory.

A vision of a golden eagle and the Dioscuri in the sky over Rome, above the Capitoline Hill, at dawn shortly after the Battle of Caporetto (October 24 – November 19, 1917). This was interpreted by the Ekatlos group as a prophetic sign of Italy’s final victory, despite the recent catastrophe of Caporetto.

The conferral of the title of Consul of Italy on Benito Mussolini by a member of the group, Regina Terruzzi. This allegedly took place in Milan, at Piazza San Sepolcro on March 23, 1919, the day and place of the founding of the Fasci Italiani di Combattimento, and also coinciding with the Roman festival of the Tubilustrium.

The delivery to Mussolini of what Ekatlos referred to as the "Etruscan ritual formula of purification," specifically the Latin phrase Quod bono faustumque sit.

The delivery of a reconstructed fasces to Mussolini at the Palazzo del Viminale on May 19, 1923, by Professor Cesarina Ribulsi, dressed in red (an auspicious color in ancient Rome) and introduced to Mussolini by Regina Terruzzi. Both Ribulsi and Terruzzi were attending the International Women's Congress in Rome and were received by Mussolini on that occasion.

The creation of an image of a crowned phoenix, bearing the inscription R.R.R.I.A.T.C.P., and its placement in a small building in the old city of Rome. This image was intended to evoke the rebirth of Roman paganism and the restoration of the empire.

The article was later altered by Evola in subsequent editions published in Introduction to Magic, though it appears to have already been edited in the 1928 issue of Krur. According to Baistrocchi, the original author's name was likely Ekatlo, to which Evola added an "s"; likewise, the phoenix inscription may originally have been R.R.R.J.A.P.T.C.

The identification of Ekatlos with Leone Caetani has been proposed by Marco Baistrocchi, Sandro Consolato, Renato Del Ponte, Massimo Introvigne, and Claudio Mutti, but this is disputed by others who suggest Ekatlos may have been a woman. Julius Evola referred to a female anthroposophist, and according to Consolato, he may have been referring to Maria Calzone Mongenet, who at the time was president of a Kremmerzian circle in Rome.

The second figure in question used the pseudonym Ottaviano and signed several pagan-themed articles published in the Kremmerzian journal Commentarium. In his final article, titled Gnosticism and Initiation, he openly declared himself a pagan.

According to the testimony of the esotericist Marco Daffi (pseudonym of Baron Ricciardo Ricciardelli), this pseudonym may also have been used by Leone Caetani. However, other sources identify Ottaviano as a certain engineer named Koch, then-owner of the Roman headquarters of the Brotherhood of Myriam.

== Works ==
- Annali dell' Islam (Milan, Ulrico Hoepli, 1905–1907), 10 volumes
- "Uthman and the Recension of the Koran", Muslim World 5 (1915), pp. 380–90
- Study of the history of the Orient (Milan, Ulrico Hoepli, 1914)
