= Gaetano (surname) =

Gaetano or De Gaetano is an Italian surname. Notable people with the surname include:

== Gaetano ==
- Gianluca Gaetano (born 2000), Italian professional footballer
- Juan Gaetano, Spanish pilot who may have been, in 1555, one of the first Europeans to find Hawaii
- Nick Gaetano, 21st century book illustrator
- Rino Gaetano (1950–1981), Italian singer-songwriter

== De Gaetano ==
- Antonio De Gaetano (1934–2007), Italian race walker, father of Giuseppe
- Giuseppe De Gaetano (born 1966), Italian race walker
- Vincent A. De Gaetano (born 1952), Maltese judge

== See also ==
- Paul DiGaetano (born 1953), American politician
- Gaetano, an Italian masculine given name
- Gaetano (disambiguation)
