= Léon Heuzey =

French archaeologist and historian (1831-1922)

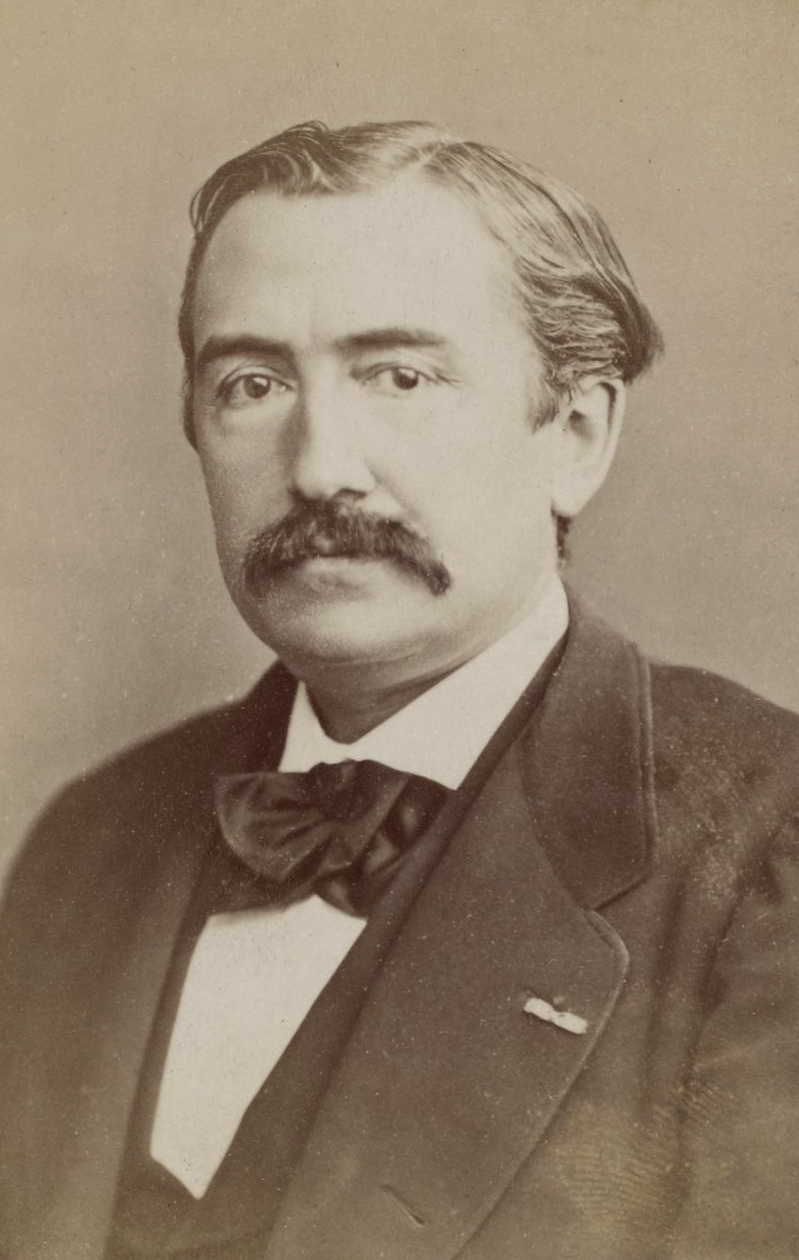
- Heuzey, c. 1870–1880
- Born: December 1, 1831; Rouen, France
- Died: February 8, 1922 (aged 90); Paris, France
- Burial place: Auteuil Cemetery

Signature
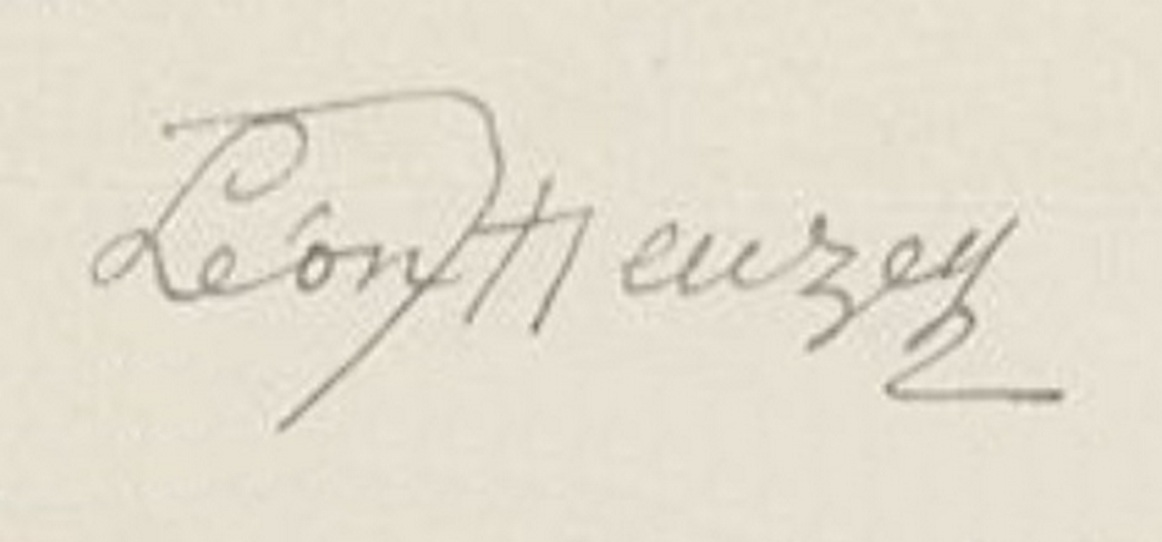

Léon Heuzey (French pronunciation: [leɔ̃ øzɛ]; December 1, 1831 – February 8, 1922) was a noted French archaeologist and historian.

== Life and career ==
In 1855 Heuzey went to Greece as a member of the École française d'Athènes, and for the next two years traveled extensively in Macedonia and Akarnania. The record he kept of his journey, "Le Mont Olympe et l'Acarnanie", was published in Paris in 1860. On this expedition he realised the importance of the site of present-day Vergina. He began excavations there in 1861, later extending his archaeological ventures to Philippi, western Macedonia, Illyria and Thessaly.

He discovered many sites of considerable importance. In 1855 and 1861 he explored Dion, located at the foot of Mount Olympus. Near by Dion he detected the place where ancient Leivithra is located. In Thessaly, he found the stele of Pharsalos. In 1893 he discovered the site of Delphi, which led to its excavation and appreciation of its significance.

He was also an expert on historic costumes of the Ancient Greek, Byzantine, Egyptian and Roman eras and author of Histoire du costume antique d'après des études sur le modèle vivant. Another one of his books is Mythes chaldéens.
