= Raimondas =

Raimondas is a masculine Lithuanian given name. Notable people with the name include:

- Raimondas Rumšas (born 1972), Lithuanian cyclist
- Raimondas Vainoras (born 1965), Lithuanian footballer
- Raimondas Vilčinskas (born 1977), Lithuanian cyclist
- Raimondas Vilėniškis (born 1976), Lithuanian footballer
- Raimondas Šiugždinis (born 1967), Lithuanian sailor
- Raimondas Šukys (born 1966), Lithuanian lawyer and politician
- Raimondas Žutautas (born 1972), Lithuanian footballer and manager
