= Lovatelli urn =

Ancient funerary urn

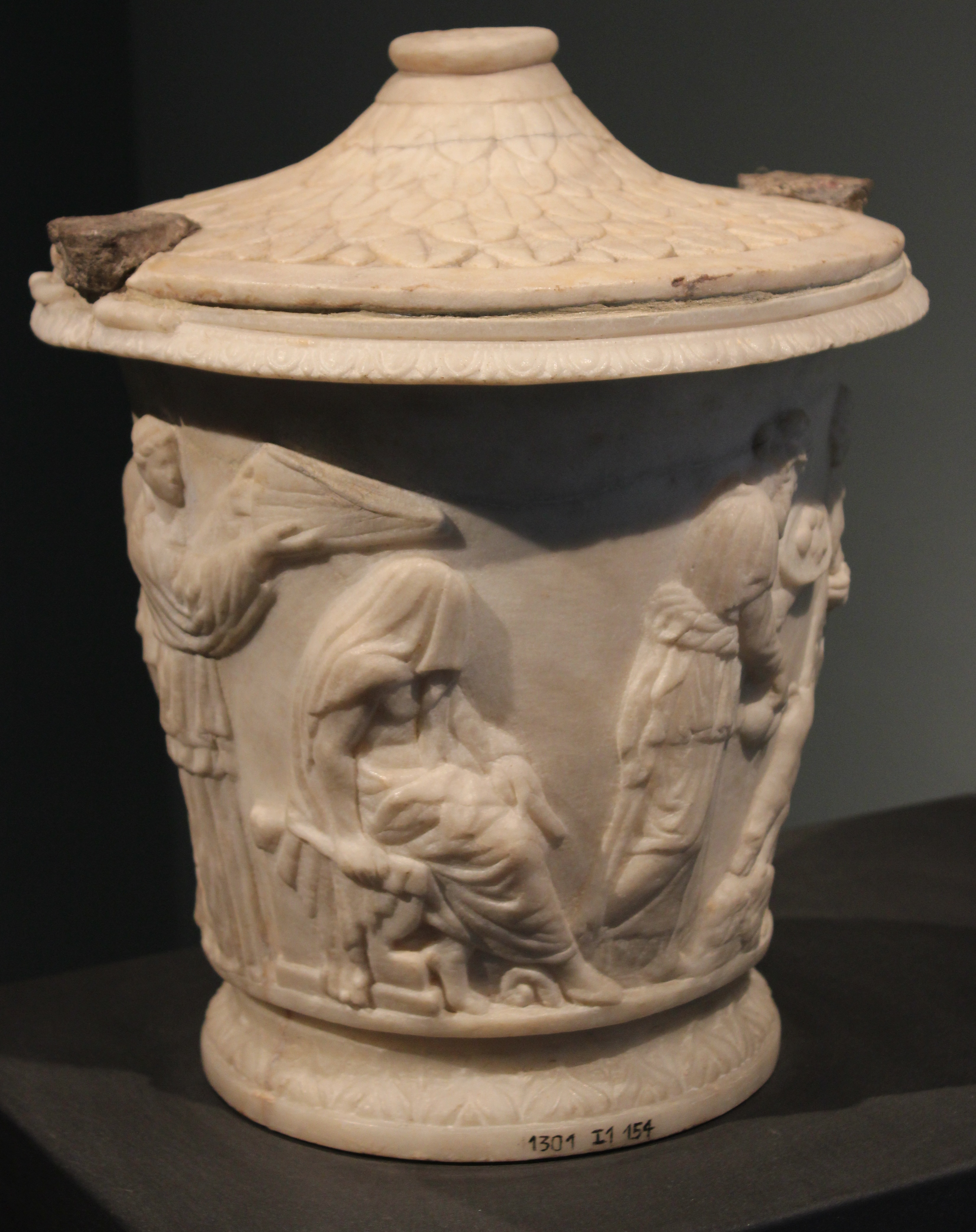
- Artist: Unknown
- Year: Probably early Imperial or 1st century CE (discovered 1876)
- Type: Marble funerary urn
- Dimensions: Height: 29.4 cm. Diameter: 32 cm.
- Location: National Roman Museum at Palazzo Massimo, Rome

The Lovatelli urn is an early Roman imperial period or 1st century CE marble funerary urn. It is thought to depict Persephone, Demeter and Triptolemus, the triad of the Eleusinian Mysteries, however, there are several different competing interpretations about the figures and their meaning in the literature.

It was found during an 1876 excavation of the columbarium of the Statilii on the Esquiline Hill near Porta Maggiore in Rome, Italy. This area contained the remains of freed slaves and servants of the family. The object is named after Ersilia Caetani Lovatelli, an Italian art historian and archaeologist who first published a description of it in 1896. It is held in the collection of the National Roman Museum.

== Background ==
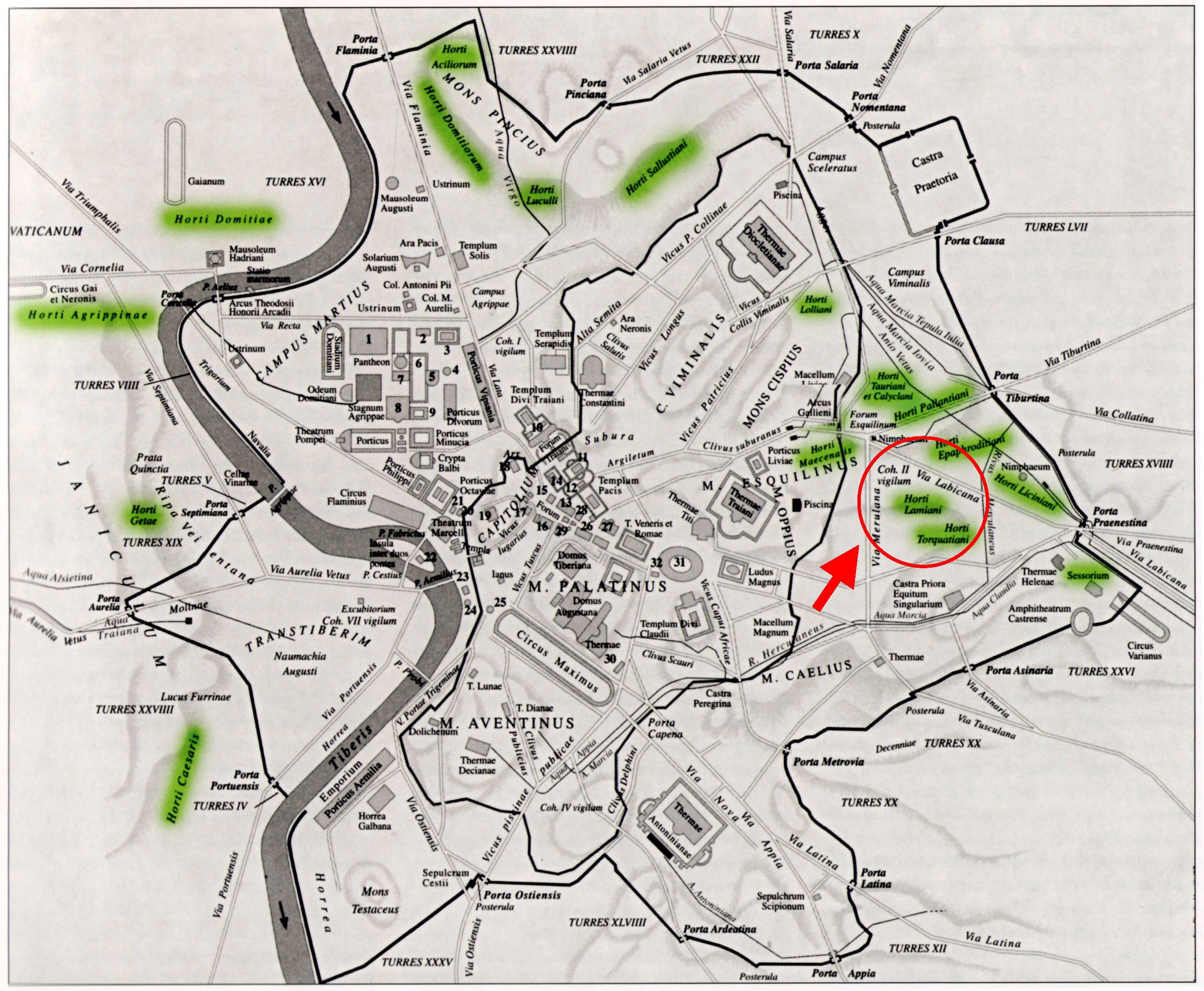
The urn was found towards the top left of the red circle, in the columbarium of the Statilii family, located near the Via Labicana, in the Esquiline cemetery.

The urn was discovered in 1876 during the excavation of the columbarium of the Statilii family by Italian archaeologists Edoardo Brizio and Rodolfo Lanciani from 1875 to 1877. They discovered three chamber tombs referred to as N, O, and P.

== Description ==
The urn depicts three separate scenes, thought to portray a preliminary initiation and purification rite from the Lesser Eleusinian Mysteries, often described as myesis. The imagery is often compared and contrasted with the Torre Nova sarcophagus first identified by Giulio Emanuele Rizzo in 1910. Lovatelli describes such an urn in 1879 in her work "Di un vaso cinerario con rappresentanze relative ai misteri di Eleusi". Her style is evident in her writing. She talks within the scientific methods required but she pulls in other related and referenced works. This differed from her male contemporaries.

== See also ==
- Roman funerary art
- Roman funerary practices
