= Things Past (Malcolm Muggeridge) =

hardback edition

Things Past is a 1978 anthology of writings by Malcolm Muggeridge. The earliest entry is dated 1928, the last 1978, the year of publication. The range of subjects is largely autobiographical, including Muggeridge's encounters with Kim Philby and others of his generation.
