= San Gaetano alla Marina, Catania =

Building in Catania, Italy

Coordinates: 37.502748°N 15.092103°E

San Gaetano alla Marina is a small, Roman Catholic parish church located on via San Gaetano #13 close to the former port of Catania, region of Sicily, Italy.

== History and description ==
The present church was built after the 1693 earthquake. Previously the site had a church dedicated to St Thomas of Canterbury and a monastery dedicated to San Giuliano, which became a hospital dedicated to San Marco. The church in dedicated to St Cajetan and was staffed by his Theatine order, who lived in a small adjacent monastery. The tall narrow facade has simple elements but is decorated just above the door and in a frieze along the tympanum.
