= Micromosaic =

Mosaic that uses unusually small pieces

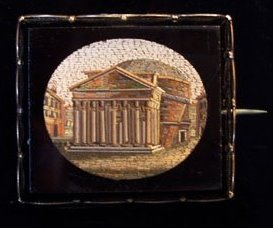
Micromosaic brooch set in black glass, c. 1875, of the Pantheon

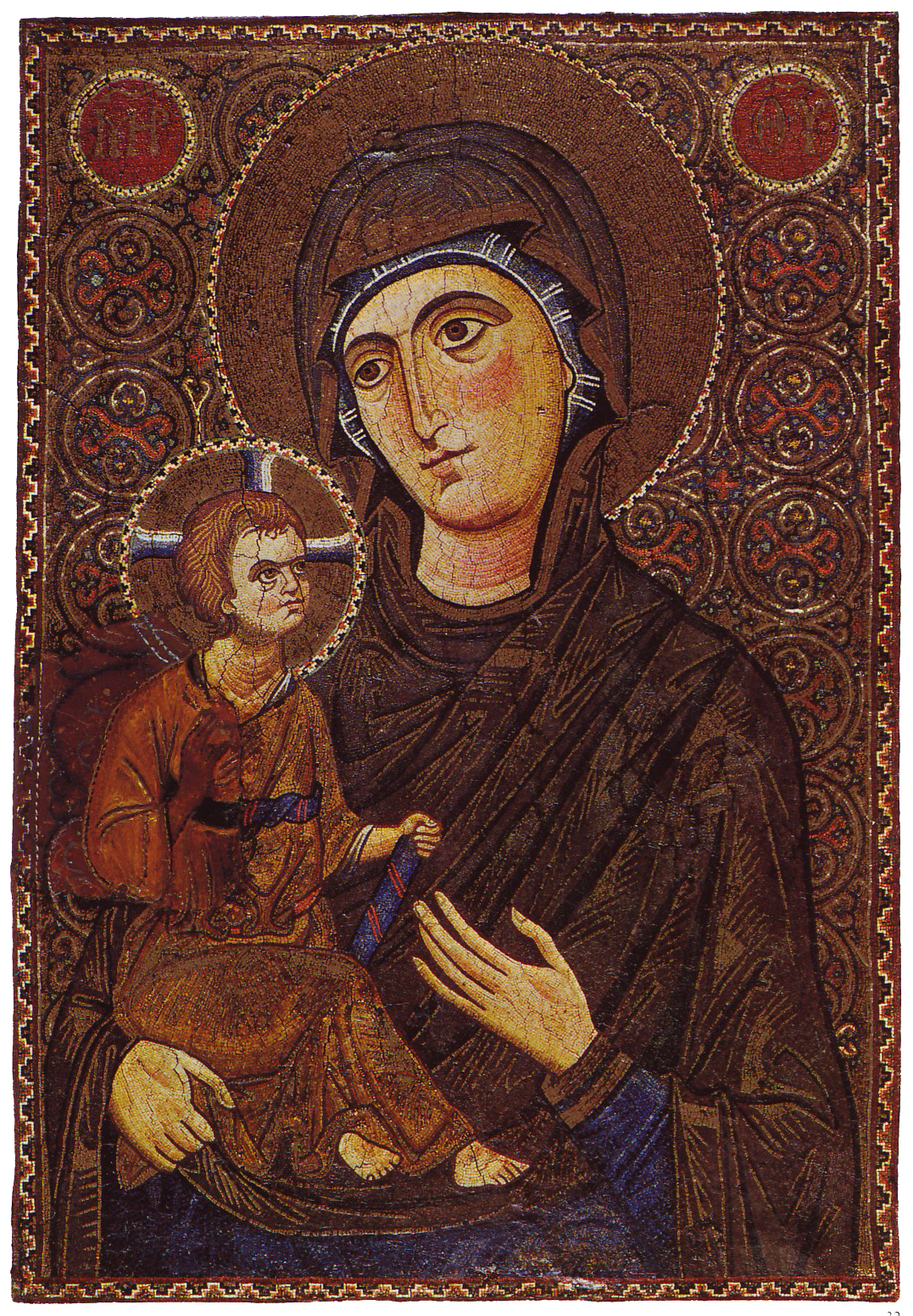
Byzantine mosaic icon, 45 cm high, 13th century.

Micromosaics (or micro mosaics, micro-mosaics) are a special form of mosaic that uses unusually small mosaic pieces (tesserae) of glass, or in later Italian pieces an enamel-like material, to make small figurative images. Surviving ancient Roman mosaics include some very finely worked panels using very small tesserae, especially from Pompeii, but only from Byzantine art are there mosaic icons in micromosaic with tesserae as small as the best from the Modern period. Byzantine examples, which are very rare, were religious icons. They are usually framed and treated like portable paintings.

== Byzantine survivals ==
Byzantine micromosaics, usually all attributed to Constantinople, apparently all or nearly all come from the Late Byzantine period, from around 1300 until the Fall of Constantinople in 1453. The best known shows the Twelve Great Feasts of the Greek Orthodox Church and is in the Bargello in Florence. It is said to have been given to the Florence Baptistry in 1394 by the widow of a Byzantine court official. Another is in Santa Croce in Gerusalemme in Rome and was crucial in developing the iconography of the Man of Sorrows in the West; it was believed to be an original image from the time of Pope Gregory the Great in the 6th century, but is now dated to around 1300 in Constantinople.

There was a new influx of icons and Greeks to Italy after 1453. Prominent collectors included Pope Paul II (d. 1471), who by 1457 had 23 micromosaic icons and 13 painted or relief ones. Some later passed to Lorenzo de' Medici, who owned 11 mosaic icons in at his death in 1492. The Greek Cardinal Bessarion gave several icons to Saint Peter's, Rome, and lent Greek manuscripts to Francesco d'Este to be copied; d'Este may have had some of Paul II's icons.

== History ==
From the Renaissance they began to be made in Italy, reaching the height of their popularity in the mid 19th century, when Rome was the centre of production; there was a Vatican Mosaic Studio from 1576, set up to create mosaic replicas of the altarpieces in St Peter's Basilica, which were being damaged by the humid conditions of the vast and crowded interior. They were popular purchases by visitors on the Grand Tour, easily portable, and often taken home to set into an object there. Typical scenes were landscapes of Roman views, rarely of any artistic originality, and the micromosaics were small panels used to inset into furniture or onto snuffboxes and similar objects, or for jewellery. Religious subjects were copied from paintings. The very smallest mosaic pieces come from works from the period between the late 18th century and the end of the 19th. Fortunato Pio Castellani (1794–1865) expanded the range of subjects in his work in the "archeological style", copying Roman and Early Christian wall-mosaics. It was even imitated by porcelain painters, who painted faint lines across their work to suggest the edges of tesserae.

A distinctive feature of micromosaics is that the tesserae are usually oblong rather than square. The best work can achieve 3,000 to 5,000 tesserae per square inch. The best collections are in the Hermitage Museum and the Gilbert Collection in London. Asia has produced a number of contemporary examples using modern precision machinery to produce the diminutive elements.

== Micromosaic jewelry and souvenirs ==
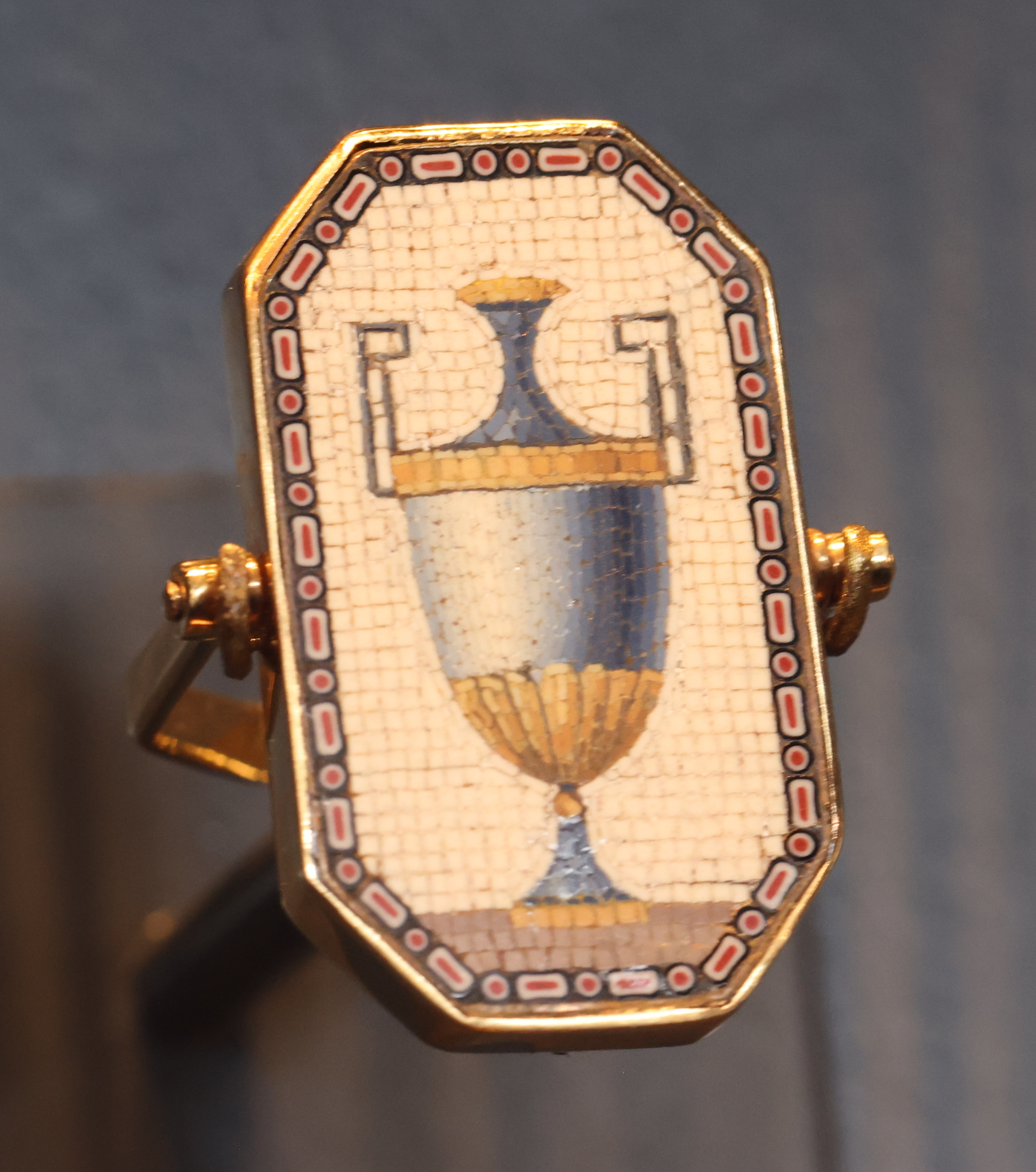
A Micromosaic finger ring from around 1800

Wearing micromosaic jewelry became popular during the Grand Tour period (17th–19th century). Members of rich European families would travel around Europe, taking in the sights and cultures of different countries. Italy was a very popular tourist spot as it had a long and prestigious history in arts and culture — a favourite subject in aristocratic circles. It was also a famous glass producer, and canny Italian craftsmen quickly turned their glass-making skills to making stunning miniature micromosaic pictures for their rich visitors.

Mosaic work jewellery of this period usually depicted famous Italian landmarks such as the Colosseum and St. Peter's Basilica, though occasionally Roman mythology was a subject too. The richest tourists would commission their own mosaics, with animals and famous works of art being favourite subjects. The small size of the micromosaic was appealing; micromosaics could be worn on the Grand Tourists' continuing journey, or sent back home to loved ones as a kind of fore-runner to modern postcards.

Many micromosaics, rather than being sold in Italy, were exported to jewelers in London and Paris to be set into larger pieces.

Micromosaic jewelry fell out of fashion in the 1870s.
