= Ersilia Caetani Lovatelli =

Italian art historian, cultural historian and archaeologist

Ersilia Caetani-Lovatelli
- Born: 12 October 1840; Rome
- Died: 22 December 1925 (aged 85); Rome
- Known for: Early archaeologist
- Spouse: Giovanni Lovatelli
- Children: 6

Ersilia Caetani-Lovatelli or Ersilia Caetani (12 October 1840 – 22 December 1925) was an Italian aristocrat, art historian, cultural historian and archaeologist.

== Personal life ==
Caetani-Lovatelli was born in Rome in 1840 to Michelangelo Caetani, Duke of Sermoneta, Prince of Teano and the Polish Countess Calixta Rzewuska (1810-1842). Her mother was from an important Rzewuski family, while her father's aristocratic Caetani family had featured in the history of Rome and Pisa. She learnt Greek, Latin and Sanskrit. Lovatelli was the first woman to become a member of the Accademia Nazionale dei Lincei, which is the oldest Italian scientific academy.

When she was a widow she would open her salon at the Caetani Palace on Tuesdays and Thursdays. The salon attracted writers and composers such as Stendhal, Honoré de Balzac Nikolai Gogol and Franz Liszt. Actually, the salon operated from 1870 to 1915 and her husband died in 1879. Caetani-Lovatelli was interested in archaeology and history and published papers on several subjects. Lovatelli describes an urn in just one of her papers from 1879. In her paper "Di un vaso cinerario con rappresentanze relative ai misteri di Eleusi", her style is evident. She talks within the scientific methods required but she pulls in other related and referenced works. This differed from her male contemporaries.

Caetani-Lovatelli joined several academic societies. Around 1915 was the end of the salons in Italy as society became embroiled in the first world war.

Caetani-Lovatelli died in Rome in 1925.

== Personal life ==
In 1859 she married Count Giacomo Giovanni Lovatelli (1832-1879), son of Count Francesco Lovatelli (1808-1856) and Donna Costanza Chigi Albani della Rovere (1807-1879). They had two sons and three daughters:

- Giovanni Lovatelli (b. 1859)
- Kalista Lovatelli (b. 1860)
- Witold Lovatelli (b. 1869)
- Rosalia Lovatelli (b. 1872); married count Carlo Gabrielli-Wiseman (1868-1944), rear admiral in the Royal Italian Navy (Regia Marina)
- Philipp Lovatelli (b. 1874); married Adelaida Keen Vargas (b. 1879) and adopted her son, Loffredo Gaetani dell'Aquila d'Aragona Lovatelli

== Professional life ==
Ersilia's work focused on Roman life, including ancient Roman dress, inscriptions, traditions, private life, and poetry. She wrote about archaeological field techniques and philology.

== See also ==
- Lovatelli urn
