= Sveva Caetani =

Italian-Canadian artist

Sveva Caetani (August 6, 1917 – April 28, 1994), or Sveva Caetani Di Sermoneta, was an Italian-Canadian artist.

Descending from the House of Caetani, Sveva Caetani represented the last of an ancient line that traces its roots back over 1,200 years and includes at least two medieval popes, Pope Gelasius II and Pope Boniface VIII, and noted politicians, cardinals, academics, artists, writers, and musicians.

She immigrated to Canada in 1921 and naturalized in 1928/1929 with her father, Leone Caetani, and her mother, Ofelia Fabiani. Leone, an Italian nobleman (Prince of Teano and Duke of Sermoneta), brought his second family to Canada to start a new life with them and escape Italy, where his socialist and democratic ideas were increasingly unpopular as fascism was rising.

They settled in Vernon, British Columbia, where Sveva would spend the rest of her life.

== Biography ==
Of Italian, English, French, Spanish, and Polish descent, Sveva Ersilia Giovanella Maria Fabiani was born in Rome. Her father, Leone Caetani, Prince of Teano (who became 15th Duke of Sermoneta shortly after her birth), was already married, to Princess Vittoria Colonna Caetani, and would remain so until his death. Her mother was his mistress, Ofelia Fabiani, daughter of a wealthy engineer in Rome. She had one half-sibling by her father's marriage, a brother, Onorato, 16th Duke of Sermoneta, but lived with disabilities. Sveva bore her mother's surname, per Italian law, though it was changed to Caetani later in her childhood in Canada.

Though she spent her first years at Villa Miraggio, a five-story mansion built by her father on the Janiculum Hill in Rome, her parents left Italy to settle in Canada in the town of Vernon, British Columbia in 1921. There the duke purchased a late-19th-century wood house in the neighbourhood of East Hill. As her father wrote to a friend about the move, "This is not an abandonment of my country and my affairs but a return to simple nature, to a primitive life, a longing for peace and rest after the torment of war and the post-war period. A spiritual rest ..."

Sveva was educated by private tutors and governesses, as well as Crofton House School in Vancouver. During the first 10 years after arriving in Canada, the Caetani family frequently commuted back and forth between Canada and Europe, largely because Ofelia "found Canadian life rather too simple for her cosmopolitan tastes ..." Combining business with pleasure, the family's trips to Europe included visits to friends and relatives and stops at various real estate holdings. It was through this exceptional education that Sveva learned a love of art.

The Duke of Sermoneta lost much of his fortune in 1929, and when he died of throat cancer in 1935, Sveva's life changed dramatically. Her mother became mentally and physically ill, and it was at this time that Ofelia Fabiani began demanding Sveva stay at home, avoiding all contact with the outside world. Her mother was so distressed that she would suffer severe physical ailments, such as heart palpitations, whenever Sveva would leave.

After a brief period where her mother permitted Sveva's artistic pursuits Sveva was not allowed to engage in making artwork, and for the years she remained captive in the family home, books were virtually her only connection to the outside world.

In 1960, her mother died, leaving Sveva to pursue both independence and her artistic pursuits. After completing her teaching degree at the University of Victoria, she served the local area as an art instructor at Lumby's Charles Bloom Secondary.

== Recapitulation ==
Encouraged by an art instructor at the University of Victoria, Sveva began painting seriously in her 50s. In the 1980s and early 1990s, Caetani produced a series of 47 works, consisting of 60 separate watercolours entitled Recapitulation. The series draws on the narrative of Dante's Divine Comedy, of a pilgrim on a spiritual journey, through life and humanity. Her father accompanies her on this spiritual journey, mirroring Virgil joining Dante on his.

Each painting was completed in a drybrush watercolour style that has become emblematic of Caetani's work. The themes and inspirations of the paintings are varied, incorporating elements of religion, mythology, philosophy and popular culture.

== Legacy ==
The Recapitulation series was shown in solo and group exhibitions in Canada, including Vancouver, Nanaimo, Ottawa, Toronto, and Edmonton through the 1980s and 1990s. Sveva's Recapitulation series was bequeathed to the Alberta Foundation for the Arts, and her remaining paintings and her estate were donated to the City of Vernon upon her death in 1994, with the wish that they be used to promote and benefit cultural and artistic pursuits.

In 2021, the Recapitulation series was transferred to the Caetani Cultural Centre Society, a museum and cultural centre operating within her home in Vernon, also displaying Caetani artefacts and other artwork. In 2025, the Museo nazionale delle arti del XXI secolo (MAXXI) in Rome presented Sveva Caetani: Forma e Frammento, an exhibition including the entirety of Recapitulation, marking the first time Caetani’s artwork was shown outside of Canada.

Sveva Caetani's image is depicted in downtown Vernon along with her family in a mural painted by Michelle Loughery.
