= Vittoria Colonna, Duchess of Sermoneta =

Italian writer (1880–1954)

Vittoria Colonna Caetani, Duchess of Sermoneta (London, 29 November 1880 - 1954) was an Italian writer, best known for her Memorie, translated into English as Things Past (1929).

Born daughter of the Duke of Paliano Marcantonio VI Colonna while he was stationed in London, she was brought up in the Palazzo Colonna and married in 1901 to Leone Caetani, later Duke of Sermoneta and Prince of Teano.

The couple had a son, Onorato (1902 - 1948), who was mentally and physically disabled. Leone left his wife behind in Italy in 1921 (or 1927) emigrating to Canada with his mistress, and their daughter, later artist Sveva Caetani.

== Works ==
- Memorie, Things Past (English, 1929)
- The Blind Goddess (English 1947)
