= Benedetto Caetani (died 1296) =

Italian cardinal

Benedetto Caetani (died 14 December 1296) was an Italian cardinal.

He was born in Anagni, the son of Giacomo Caetani and nephew, or remoter kinsman, of Pope Boniface VIII (1294–1303), who elevated him to the cardinalate at the beginning of 1295.

During his early life he was canon of the cathedral chapter of Anagni, a short distance to the south-east of Rome.

He subscribed papal bulls as cardinal-deacon of SS. Cosma e Damiano between 21 June 1295 and 7 May 1296.

He died on 14 December 1296 or 1297. (Sources differ.) He was buried in the chapel of S. Boniface IV within the Vatican Basilica, but in 1606 his remains were removed to the grotto of the newly rebuilt basilica and placed next to those of his uncle, the pope.

== Bibliography ==
- Eubel, Konrad, 1913: Hierarchia Catholica Medii Aevi, p. 12. Munster
