= Raimonda Gaetani =

Italian set and costume designer

Raimonda Gaetani (née Donna Raimonda Gaetani dell′Aquila d′Aragona, born 23 May 1942) is an Italian stage set and costume designer.

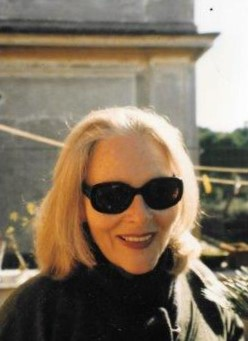

== Biography ==
Raimonda Gaetani was born in 1942 in Naples, Italy. She is the daughter of Conte Don Roberto Gaetani dell'Aquila d'Aragona and Nora Elisabetta Pattison, descendant of a family of English shipbuilders and engineers. Raimonda grew up in Naples, where she studied architecture. She currently lives between Rome, London, Positano and Tuscany.

== Career ==
Gaetani started her career working as a costume designer for theater productions, often in association with Italian directors. She then worked as set designer, costume designer and art director for theater, opera, ballet and cinema all over the world. Her sketches and costumes have been exhibited in Italy and in England.

=== Theater ===
In 1973, Gaetani designed the costumes for Saturday, Sunday, Monday by Eduardo De Filippo, at The Old Vic, London, directed by Franco Zeffirelli, starring Laurence Olivier and Joan Plowright. Again for Zeffirelli, she designed stage sets and costumes for the English production of the comedy Filumena Marturano by De Filippo at the Lyric Theatre in London, and later at the Royal Theater in Copenhagen and National Theater in Oslo.

From 1974 she started regularly cooperating with Eduardo De Filippo, for whom she designed stage sets and costumes for productions in Rome, Naples and Florence. She also designed a number of TV productions of De Filippo, Scarpetta and Pirandello. At the National Theatre in London she created stage sets ad costumes for Inner Voices with Ralph Richardson, directed by Mike Ockrent. Again for Zeffirelli, at Teatro Greco in Taormina, she designed the costumes for Sei personaggi in cerca d’autore of Pirandello.

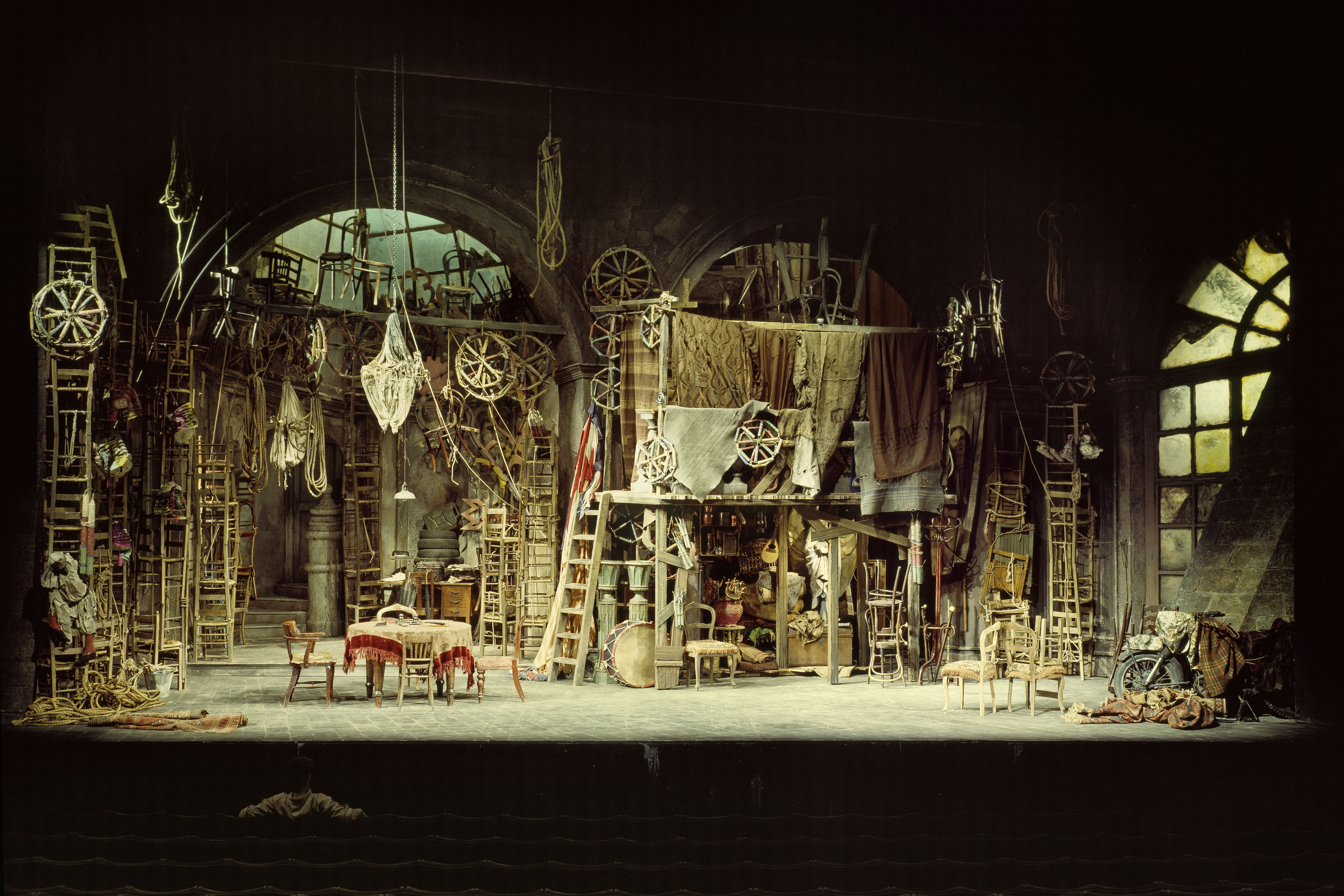
Inner Voices, National Theatre, 1973, Foto di scena Atto II © Group Three Photography, Hahnemuhle photo matt fibre 200 gsm, 50c35cm Courtesy of Archivio Raimonda Gaetani

In 1984, Gaetani designed the costumes of Ghosts by Ibsen directed by Kirsten Sørlie at the Rogaland Theater in Norway, followed by Saturday, Sunday, Monday and La grande magia by De Filippo. For the National Theater of Bergen, she designed the costumes for the Don Giovanni, directed by Bentein Baardson, and for Bernarda Alba by Lorca. In 1999 she created the stage sets and costumes for Il suicida by N. Erdman in Bergamo. In 2003 she designed the costumes for Absolutely, Perhaps, a Pirandello play starring Joan Plowright directed by Zeffirelli at the Wyndham Theatre, London, for which she received the nomination for the Laurence Olivier Award for the best costumes of the year. She worked with Luca De Filippo, designing various plays by his father, Eduardo De Filippo, and also Molière's Don Juan. La Grande Magia in 2012. In 2016 Raimonda designed sets and costumes for Filumena directed by Liliana Cavani for Spoleto Festival.

=== Opera ===
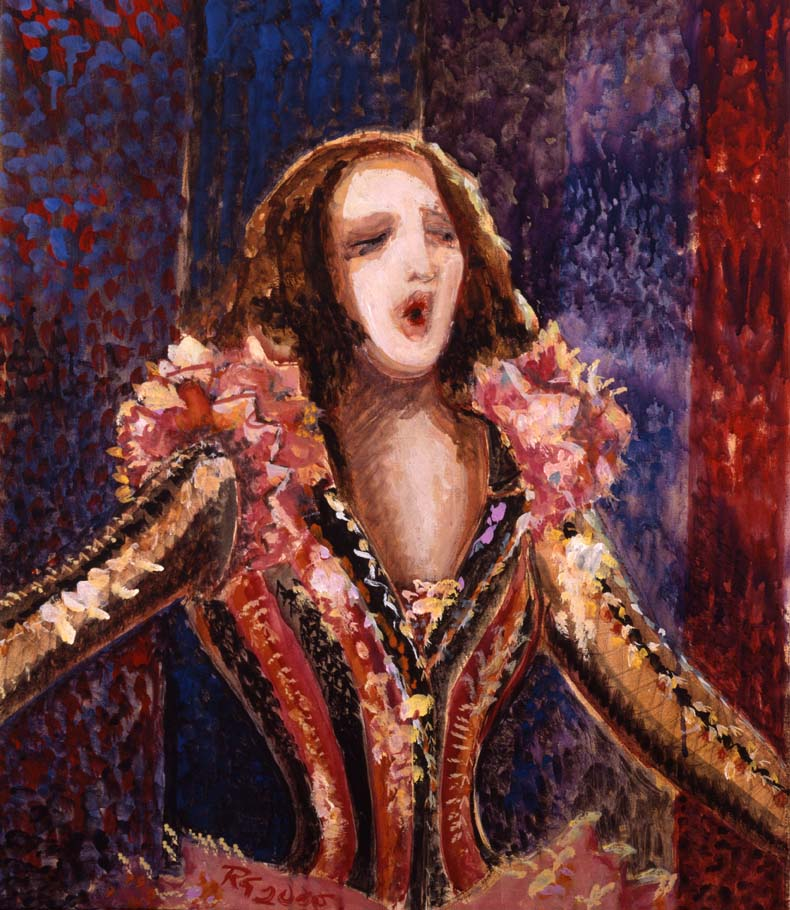
Singer (I Pagliacci) 2006; Tempera and acrylic on canvas cm 60x70; courtesy of Archivio Raimonda Gaetani

Gaetani designed sets and costumes for various productions of the opera Pagliacci directed by Zeffirelli, first presented in Leeds in 1984 (Opera North), and then in Rome (Teatro dell'Opera, 1992) and in Washington (Kennedy Center, 1997) starring Plácido Domingo. A new production of Pagliacci premiered in 2003 at Covent Garden, starring Plácido Domingo and Angela Gheorghiu. Following productions were shown in Athens (2005, Herodeion, Athens Festival), Moscow (Kremlin Theater, 2007), Genoa (Teatro Carlo Felice), Verona (Teatro Filarmonico), Los Angeles (LA Opera, 2015), and Muscat (Royal Opera House, 2018). Gaetani also designed both sets and costumes for Cavalleria Rusticana (Opera North). She created costumes for La Traviata at the Metropolitan Opera House in New York (1998), at the Teatro de la Maestranza of Seville in Spain (1999) and later in Rome (2007) and Messina (Teatro Vittorio Emanuele, 2018), always directed by Zeffirelli. Moreover, hers are the costumes for Il Trovatore at Arena di Verona (2001, 2016).

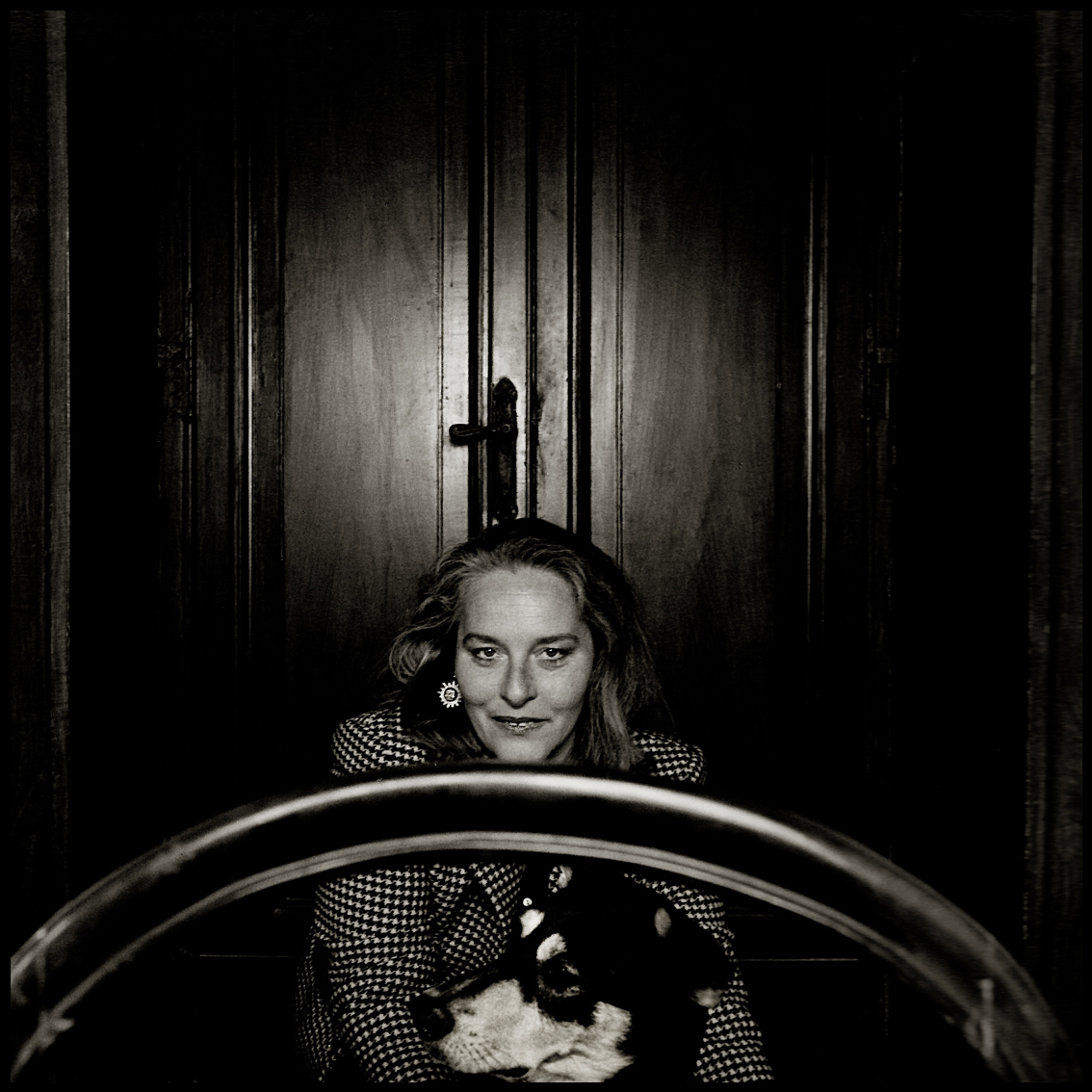
Raimonda Gaetani in 1987, photographed by Augusto De Luca

=== Ballet ===
Gaetani has been very active also as a costume designer for ballet. She created the costumes for Esoterik Satie by Lorca Massine (Teatro alla Scala in Milan), Pulcinella (Teatro La Fenice in Venice), Gaité Parisienne (Garnier Theatre in Monte Carlo), as well as a following (2005) edition for the Bolshoi Theatre in Moscow. She designed the costumes for Peer Gynt by Jamey Hampton (Grand Théâtre de Genève) and for Capriccio for Piano and Orchestra by Igor Stravinsky with choreography by Lorca Massine (Rome Opera). Moreover, she worked as set and costume designer for the ballet Raymonda (Rome Opera, 2008), for Mary Stuart, the last night (2004), and for The Nutcracker starring Carla Fracci and directed by Beppe Menegatti (Rome Opera, 2009).

=== Cinema ===
Gaetani collaborated with distinguished Italian directors, such as Armando Pugliese, Carlo Cecchi, Enrico Maria Salerno, and Mario Monicelli. She worked with Nando Scarfiotti in the film Avanti!, directed by Billy Wilder, with Danilo Donati for Fellini's Casanova (Academy Award for Best Costume Design) directed by Federico Fellini. In 1989, she was the production designer for the special, Leonardo 2000, an experimental production in SHOWSCAN directed by Douglas Trumbull. She was art director for Young Toscanini by Zeffirelli with Elizabeth Taylor and for two further Zeffirelli films: Sparrow in 1992 and Jane Eyre (1996 film) in 1996. Raimonda Gaetani also designed costumes for productions by foreign directors such as Kirsten Sørlie, Bentein Baardson, Mike Ockrent.

== Exhibitions ==
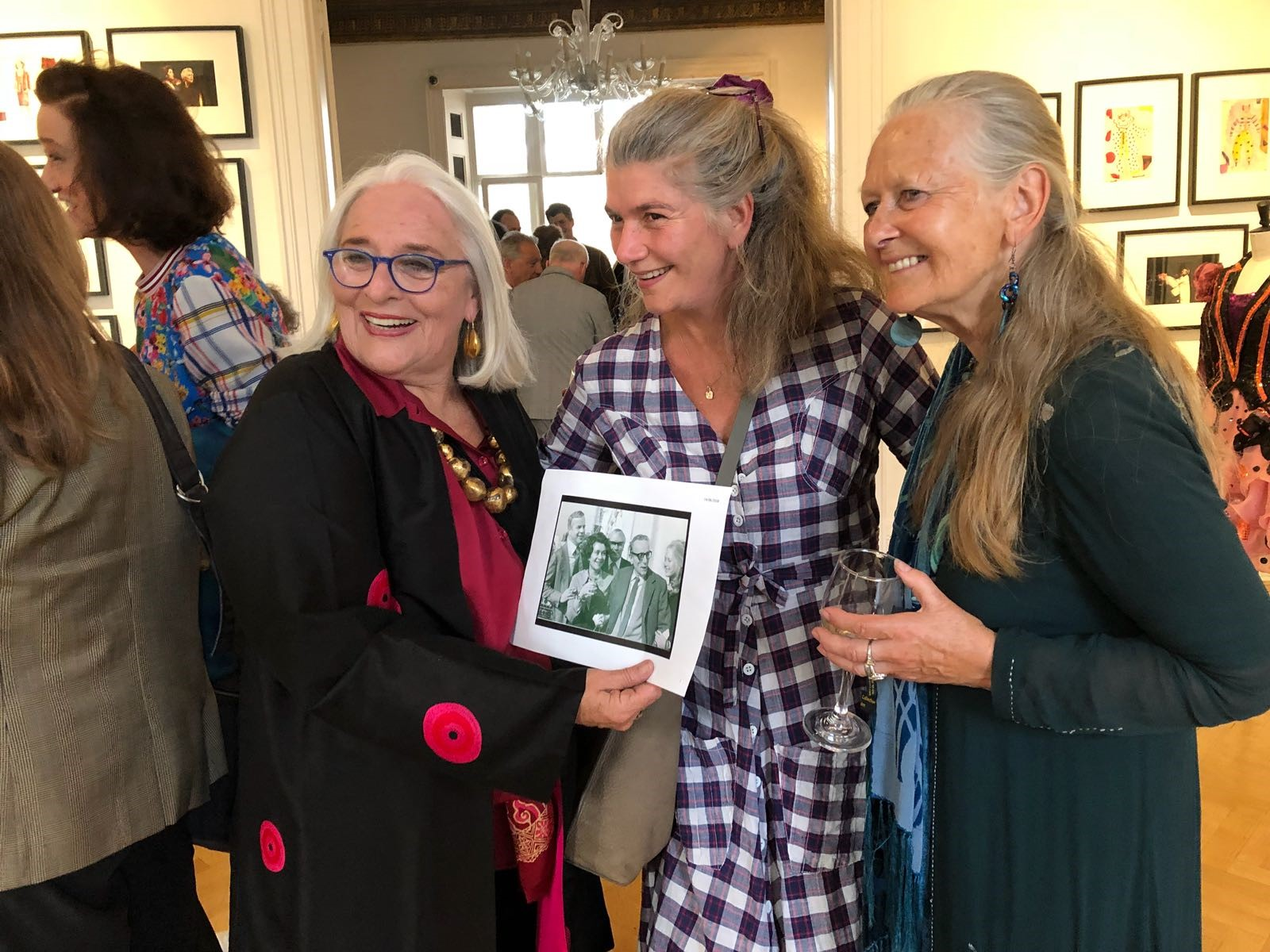
Raimonda Gaetani (sx), with Tamsin Olivier and Anna Carteret, in occasion of the exhibition Raimonda Gaetani for the English Stage at the Italian Institute of Culture, London, 2018

- 1995 Raimonda Gaetani. Il teatro di Eduardo, scenografie e bozzetti, Antonia Jannone Gallery, Milan
- 2006 Raimonda Gaetani. Il teatro, la pittura, Il Gabbiano Gallery, Rome
- 2018 Raimonda Gaetani For the English Stage, Italian Institute of Culture, London

Following the exhibition Raimonda Gaetani for the English Stage, the Department of Theater and Performance of the Victoria and Albert Museum asked to acquire the works of Raimonda Gaetani to be collected in their archives. An interview for Arte (in Italian language) evokes the atmospheres of Gaetani's productions in England, which were at the core of the exhibition.
