= Michelangelo Caetani =

Italian nobleman

This article contains material translated from the Italian Wikipedia's version of this page.

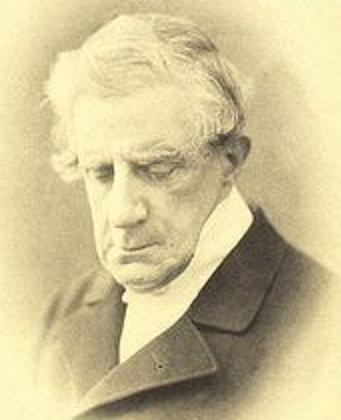
Michelangelo Caetani, (1804–1882).

Michelangelo Caetani, Duke of Sermoneta and Prince of Teano (Rome, 20 March 1804 – Rome, 12 December 1882), was a political figure, goldsmith, and an Italian scholar with a great interest in literature and sculpture.

== Life ==
He was a descendant from the Italian noble Caetani family, which played a great role in the history of Pisa and Rome. According to the practice of his time, he was educated at home by private tutors. However, his interest in arts led quickly him to study in the studios of sculptors Bertel Thorvaldsen and Pietro Tenerani, the painter Tommasso Minardi and the goldsmith Fortunato Pio Castellani. The last of the three transformed Caetani’ s drawings into actual antique-style jewelries which today are partly preserved in the National Etruscan Museum in Rome. Caetani was also a scholar of Dante Alighieri. He published relevant works, such as La Materia nella Divina Commedia and Carteggio Dantesco and designed a series of topographic maps to be used by students of the Divine Comedy. His work was printed by the monks at Monte Cassino, using early Chromolithography.

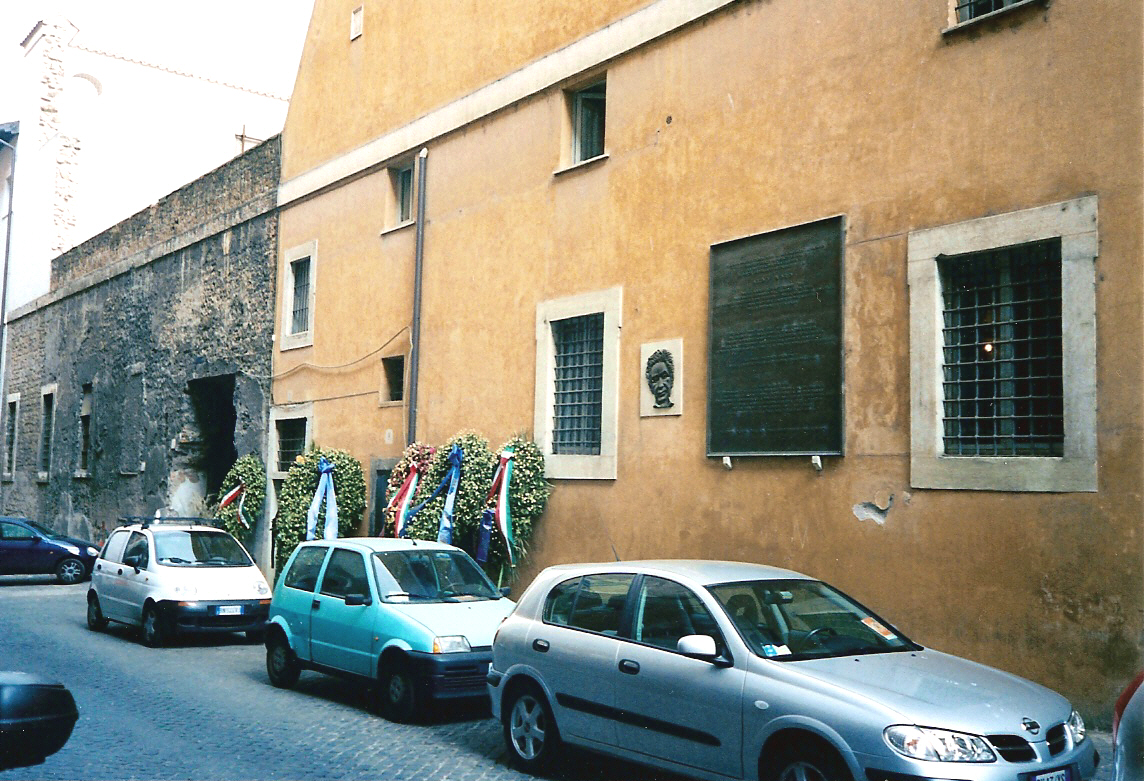
A shot of Via Michelangelo Caetani, Rome, in 2006, showing the memorial to Aldo Moro.

He was a cosmopolitan. His house was the meeting place of national and international scholars, such as François-René de Chateaubriand, Stendhal, Henry Wadsworth Longfellow, Franz Liszt, Honoré de Balzac, Renan, Hippolyte Taine, Frédéric Ozanam, Jean-Jacques Ampère, George Ticknor, Ferdinand Gregorovius, Alfred von Reumont, Démosthène Ollivier. In 1840, Caetani married the Polish Countess Calixta Rzewuski, the daughter of Wacław Seweryn Rzewuski, a well-known Polish orientalist. Their son, Onorato, was Minister of Foreign Affairs of the Kingdom of Italy, while their daughter Ersilia was an archaeologist and the first woman who was admitted to the oldest scientific academy, the Accademia Nazionale dei Lincei. His second wife was the English Margherita Knight and his third was Harriette Ellis, the daughter of Charles Ellis, 6th Baron Howard de Walden.

His political views subscribed to the ideology of moderate liberalism. He did not condone extremists and he was aligned with Pellegrino Rossi. He served as Minister of police in the government of Cardinal Bofondi (1846-1848), in collaboration with Carlo Troya and Michele Amari. After the capture of Rome and its annexation to Italy as its third capital, Caetani became the Governor of Rome. He was elected twice to the Italian Parliament and was awarded the Supreme Order of the Most Holy Annunciation due to his service to the Kingdom of Italy.

A street in Rome is named after Michelangelo Caetani, which is located to the south of Via delle Botteghe Oscure in rione XI (Sant'Angelo). It was here in May 1978 that the body of the former Italian Prime Minister Aldo Moro was discovered, following his murder by the Red Brigades (Brigate Rosse).

== Gallery ==
La materia della Divina commedia di Dante Alighieri dichiarata in VI tavole: da Michelangelo Caetani.
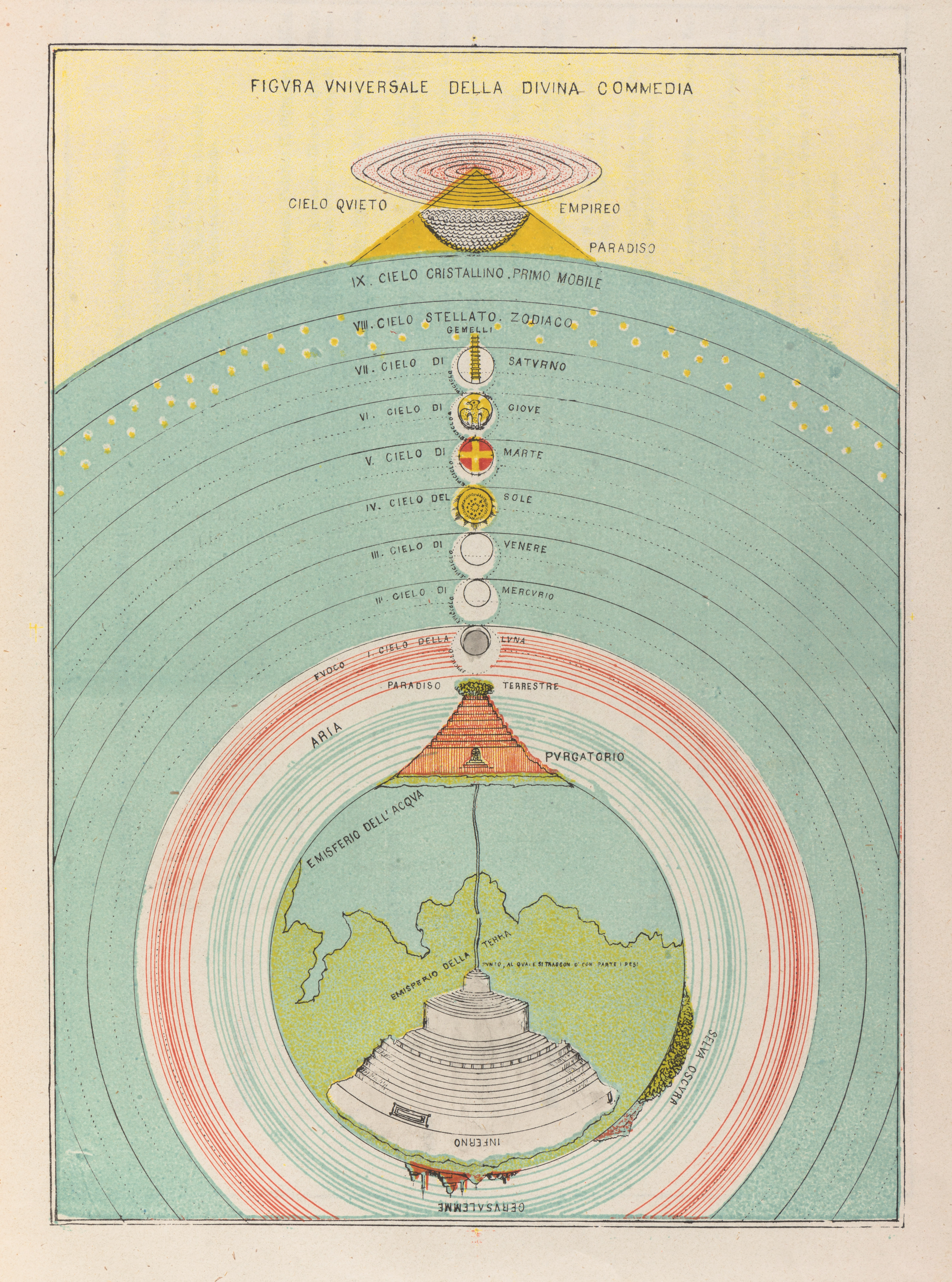
Overview of the Divine Comedy, 1855(Plate I)

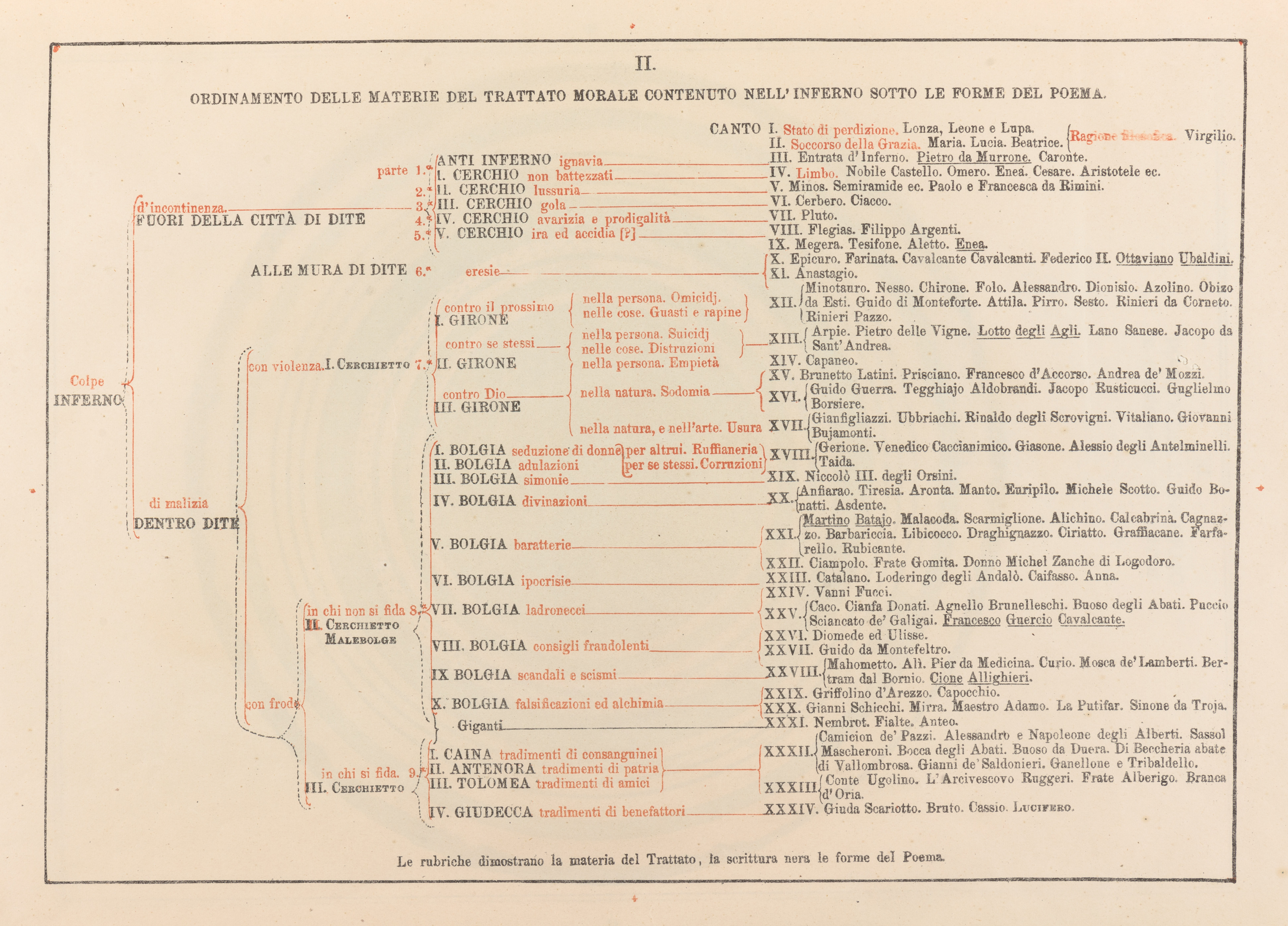
The Ordering of Hell, 1855 (Plate II)

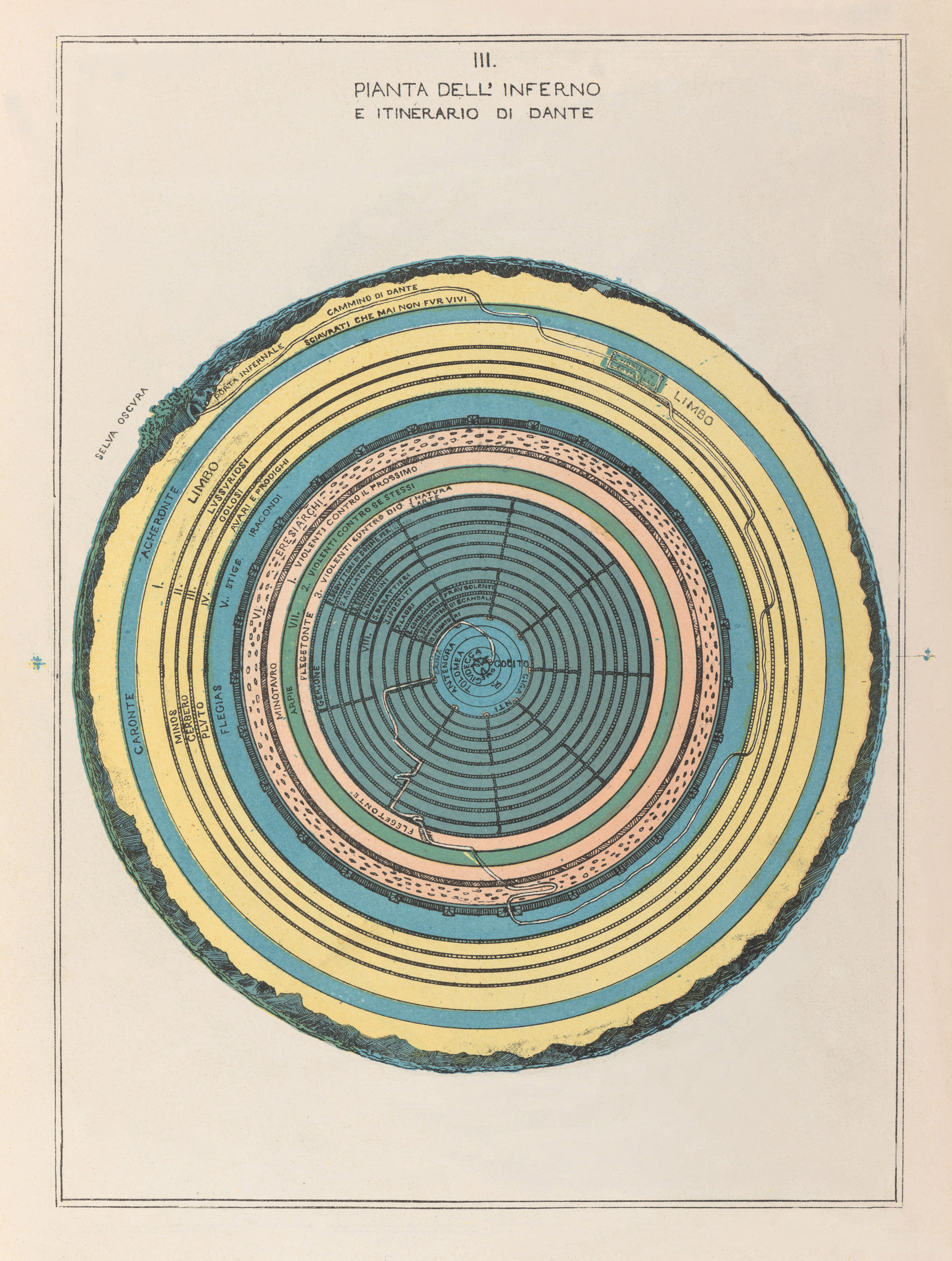
Map of Hell, 1855 (Plate III)

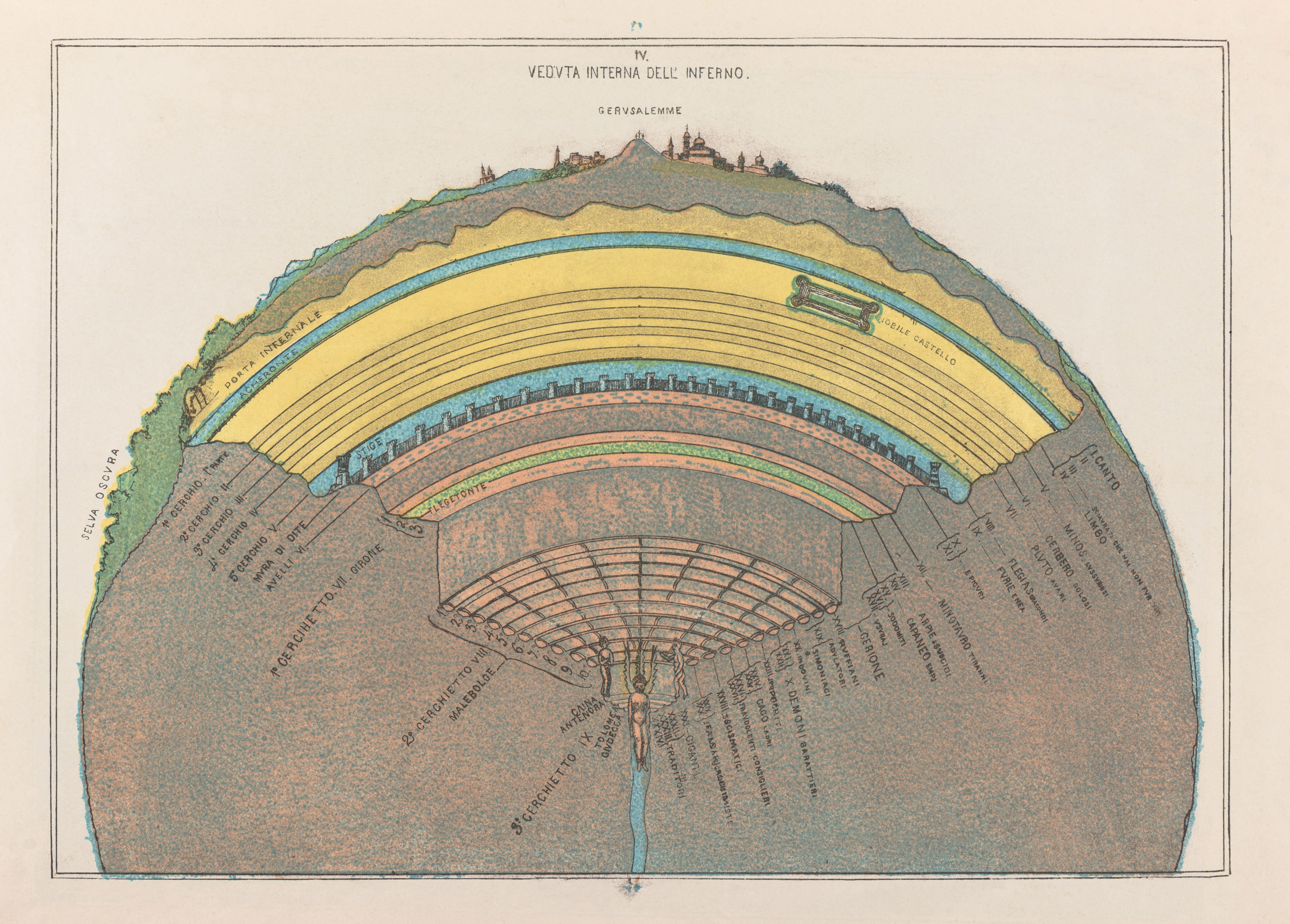
Cross Section of Hell, 1855 (Plate IV)

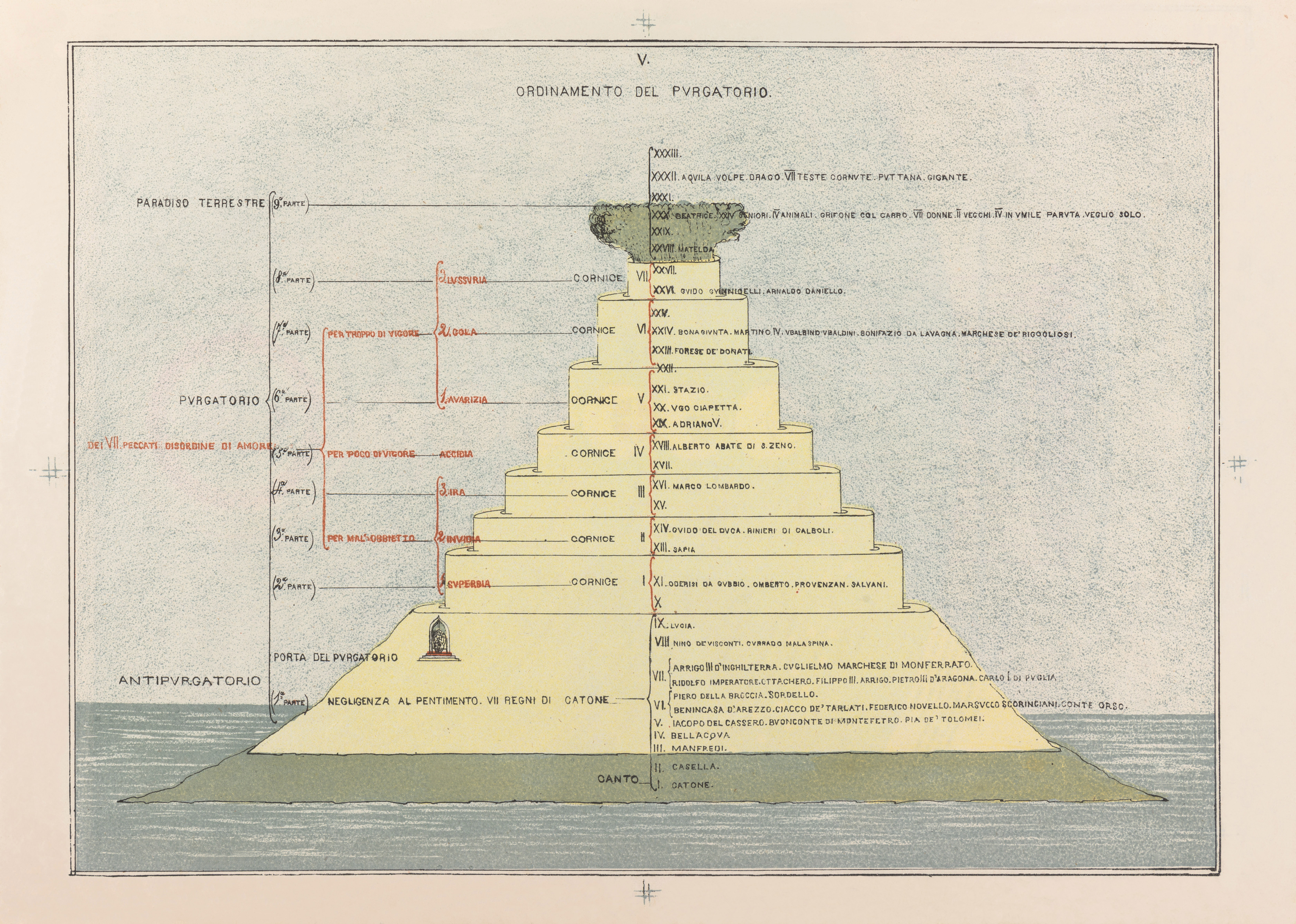
The Ordering of Purgatory, 1855 (Plate V)

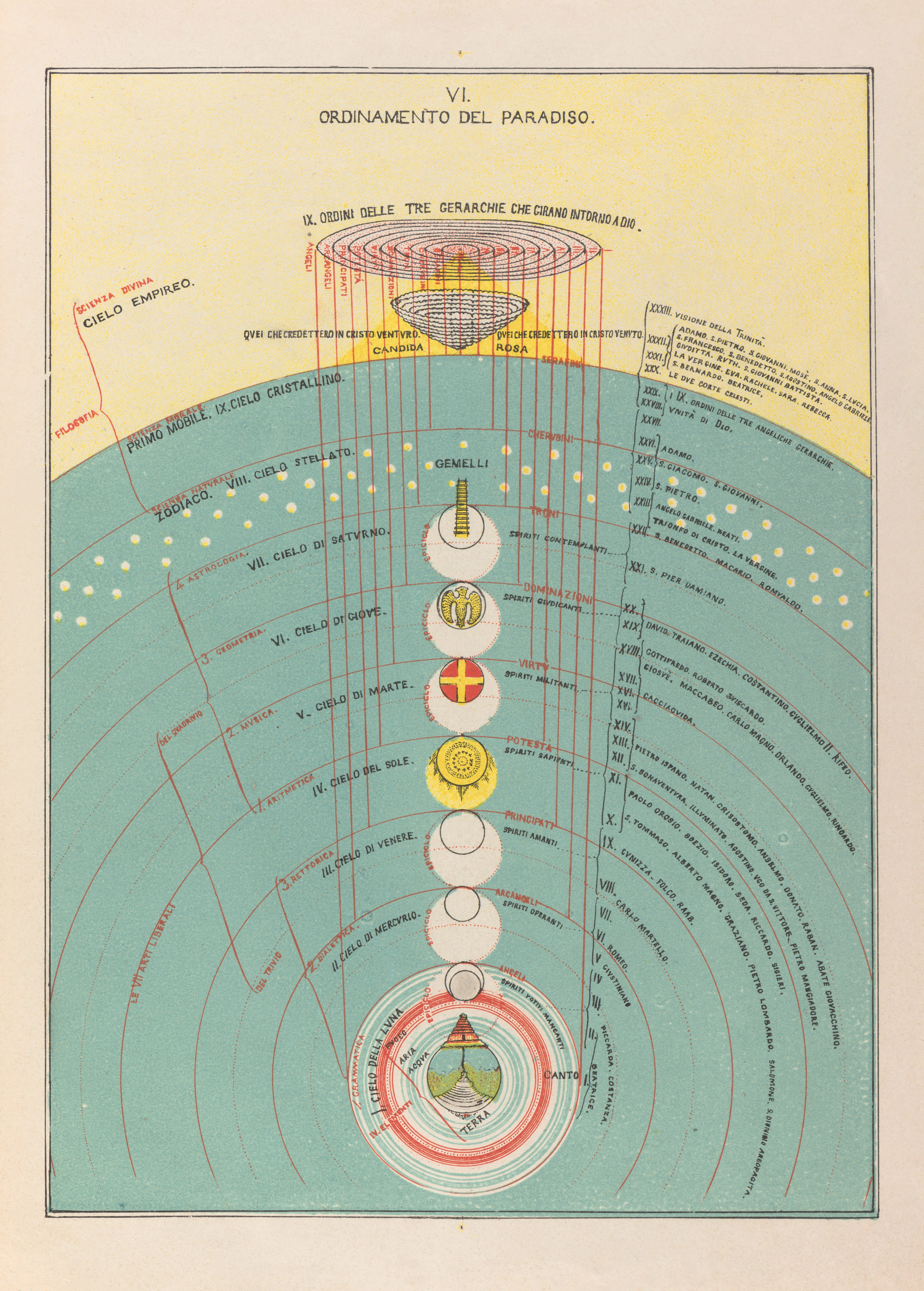
The Ordering of Paradise, 1855 (Plate VI)

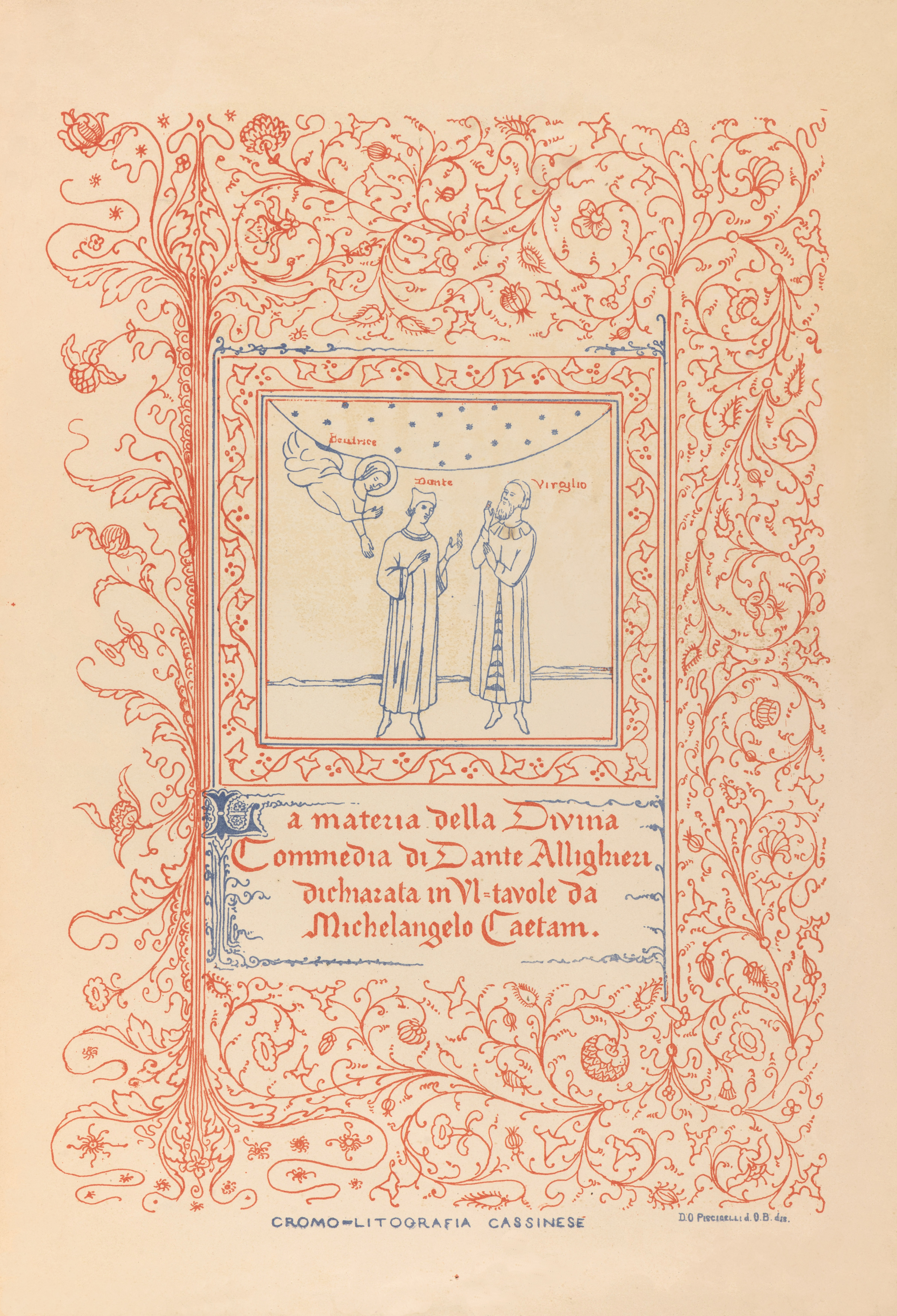
The Divine Comedy Described in Six Plates, 1855

== Works ==
- Sermoneta, M. Caetani. (1821). La materia della Divina commedia di Dante Alighieri dichiarata in VI tavole: da Michelangelo Caetani. Nuova ed. a cura di G. L. Passerini. Firenze: G. C. Sansoni.
- Sermoneta, M. Caetani. (1852). Della dottrina che si asconde nell'ottavo e nono canto dell'Inferno della Divina Commedia di Dante Allighieri: esposizione nuova di Michelangelo Caetani. Roma: Menicanti.
- Sermoneta, M. Caetani. (1881). Tre chiose di Michelangelo Caetani duca di Sermoneta nella Divina Commedia di Dante Alighieri. 3. ed. Roma: Salviucci.
- Sermoneta, M. Caetani. (1857). Matelda nella divina foresta della Commedia di Dante Allighieri: [Purg. xxviii]; disputazione tuscalana. [Roma: Salviucci.
- Società dantesca italiana. (1900). La lettera di Dante in Or San Michele e la Fondazione Michelangelo Caetani di Sermoneta. Firenze: L. Franceschini.

== Letters ==
- Sermoneta, M. Caetani. (1902). Epistolario. Firenze.
- Sermoneta, M. Caetani. (1903). Epistolario del duca Michelangelo Caetani di Sermoneta: corrispondenza dantsca. Firenze: [F. Lumachi, succ. flli. Bocca].
- Sermoneta, E. Caetani. (1904). Alcuni ricordi di Michelangelo Caetani, duca di Sermoneta. 2. ed., popolare. Milano: U. Hoepli.
- Fiorella Bartoccini (a cura di). (1974). Lettere di Michelangelo Caetani duca di Sermoneta: Cultura e politica nella Roma di Pio IX. [Roma]: Istituto di studi romani.

== Bibliography ==
- Bartoccini, Fiorella (1973). "Caetani, Michelangelo". Dizionario Biografico degli Italiani. 16.
- "Caetani Family". Encyclopædia Britannica Online. Encyclopædia Britannica Inc.
- Ghisalberti, Alberto Maria (1930). "Caetani, Michelangelo". Treccani, La cultura Italiana. Enciclopedia Italiana.
- Nazzaro, Pellegrino (2008). Fascist and anti-fascist propaganda in America : the dispatches of Italian Ambassador Gelasio Caetani. Youngstown, N.Y.: Cambria Press. ISBN 9781934043660.
- Mode, PJ. "The Collection". Persuasive Cartography, The PJ Mode Collection. Cornell University Library.
- Soros, Susan; eds, Stefanie Walker (2004). Castellani and Italian archaeological jewelry. New Haven [u.a.]: Yale Univ. Press. pp. 165–168. ISBN 9780300104615.
- "News Bulletin of the Italy America Society". Italy America Society (22): 2. December 1922.
