= Heraud =

Heraud or Héraud is a surname, and may refer to:

- Corinne Heraud, Chief Inspector of the Missile inspection team in Iraq
- Edith Heraud (died 1899), English actress, daughter of John Abraham Heraud
- Guy Héraud (1920–2003), French politician and lawyer
- Javier Heraud (1942–1963), Peruvian poet
- John Abraham Heraud (1799–1887), English journalist and poet
