= Nikolai Cemetery (Görlitz) =

Cemetery in Görlitz, Germany

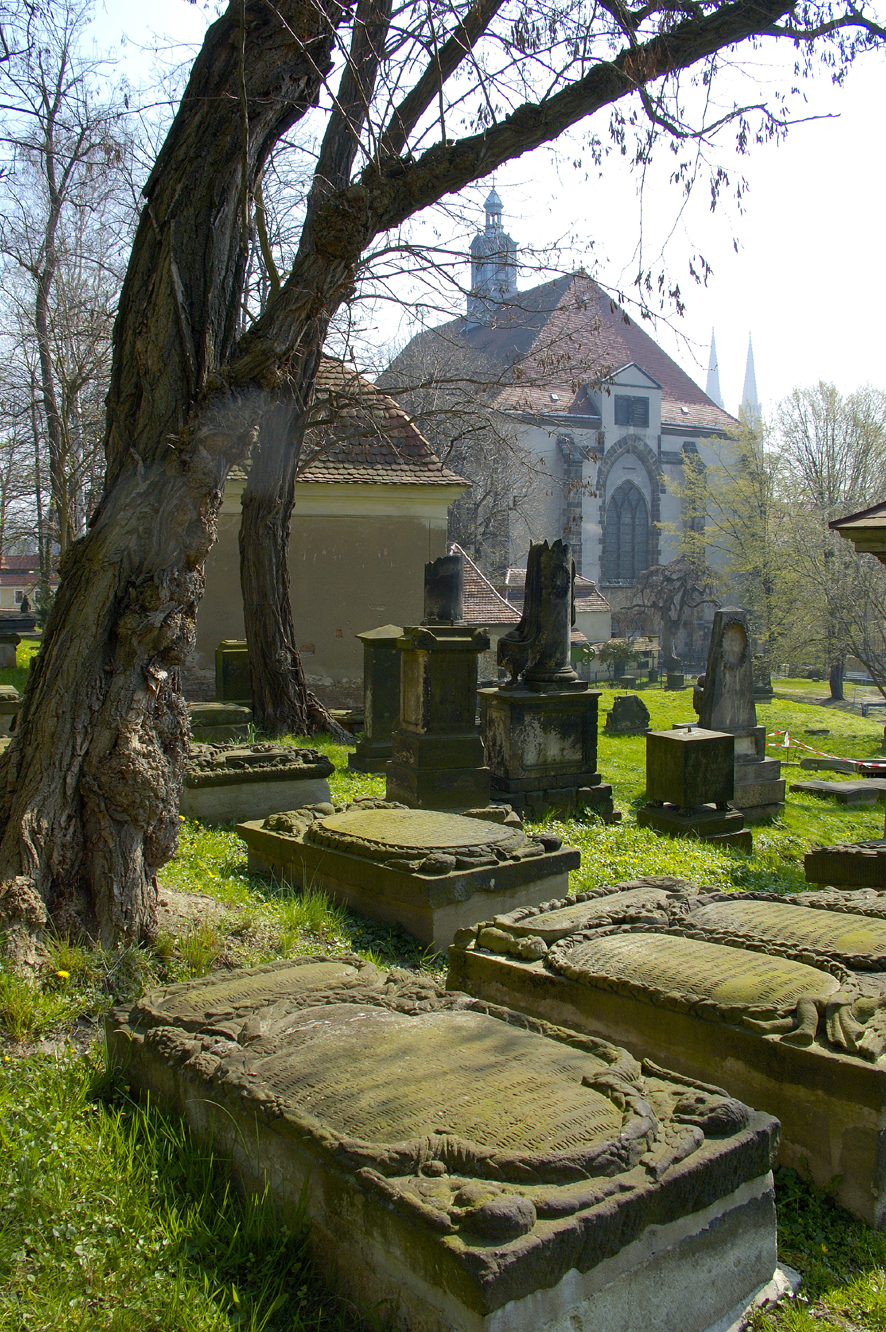
- Interactive map of Nikolai Cemetery

Details
- Established: 12th century
- Abandoned: 1847
- Location: Görlitz, Saxony, Germany
- Country: Germany
- Coordinates: 51.159660°N 14.987883°E
- Type: Lutheran Cemetery
- No. of graves: 850 graves, 17 mausoleums
- Website: www.evkulturstiftunggr.de/nklfriedhof-en.html

The Nikolai Cemetery, most likely established in the 12th century and first mentioned in 1310, is the oldest cemetery in Görlitz, Germany. After the opening of the nearby municipal cemetery in 1847, the cemetery ceased to be active and subsequent burials were only carried out in exceptional circumstances. Despite not having regular burial services any longer, the 850 gravestones and 17 mausoleums inside the cemetery all remain in good condition, some of which date back to the 17th century.

== History ==
Originally, the cemetery surrounded the previous building of the late Gothic Nicolai church. The cemetery extended to the north-side of the church during the mid-age, and between 1559 and 1624 the cemetery slowly expanded to the west side of the church. In 1633, victims of the Plague were buried there in mass graves. To this day there are markings on the meadow where the bodies were buried. In 1820 the wall on the south side of the graveyard was demolished and the area has been developed into a forecourt of the church. Since 1847 burials are carried out in the adjoining municipal cemetery.

== Tombs and Epitaphs ==
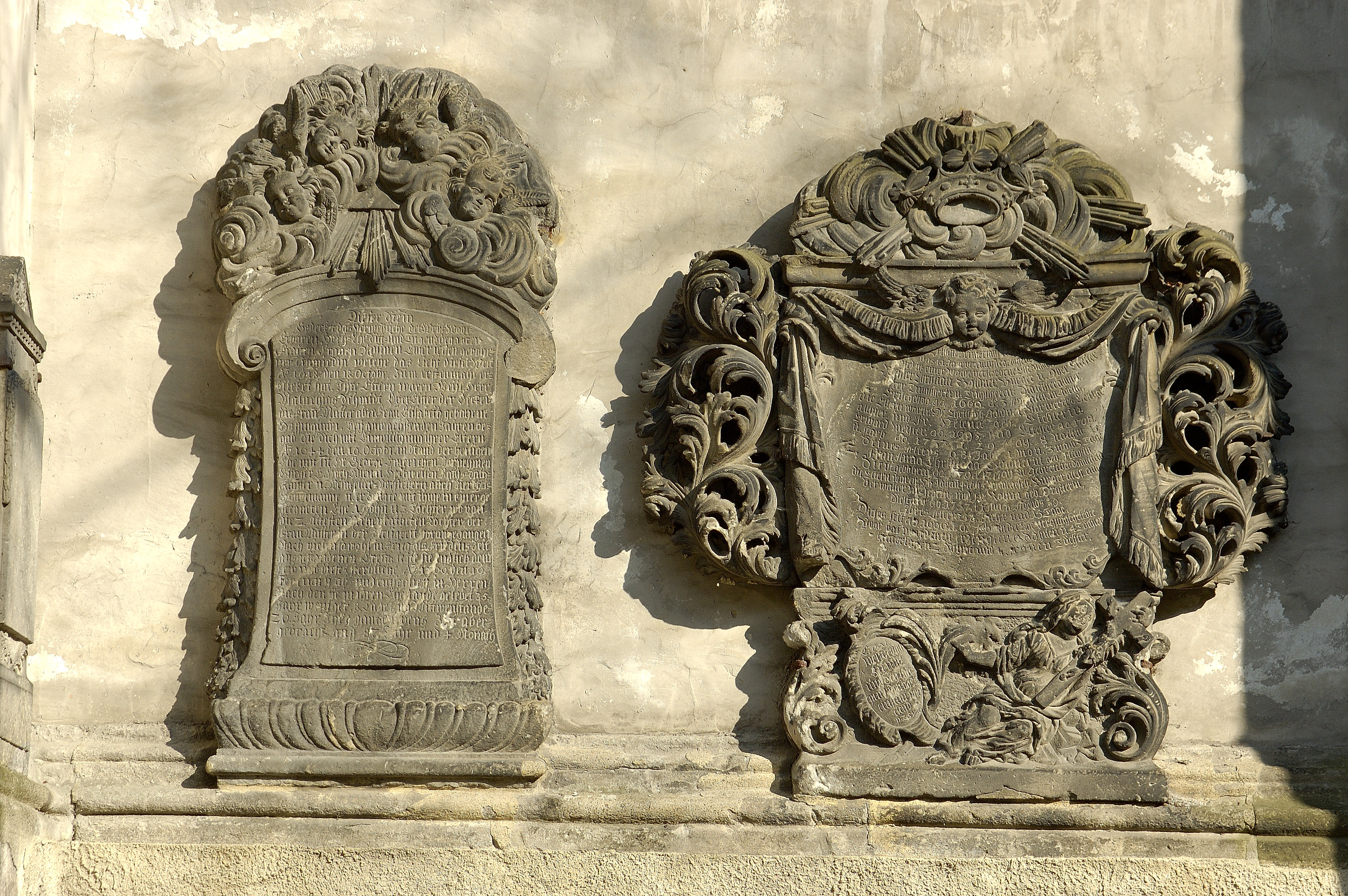
Epitaphs at the church

There are about 850 tombs and epitaphs remaining on the Nikolai Cemetery, most of which date back to between the 17th and mid-19th century. There were only a few tombs or commemorative tablets erected after 1847 – mostly inside existing mausoleums. The style of each tomb varies depending on the time they were erected, and many styles can be seen including Mannerism, Baroque, Rococo and Classicism. Later headstones also show styles of Romanticism and Historicism.

The tombs before the 19th century were cut from Silesian sandstone. Starting in the 1800s, the softer Elbe Sandstone and cast iron were used – a combination of materials that are common components of industrial production.

Tombs erected in the 17th and 18th century show numerous Christian and biographical inscriptions and are surrounded by different deteriorating sculptures. Christian theological virtues like hope, love and faith are represented. Many stones resemble Christian Emblems.

There are only a few tombs dating back to the Renaissance, because at that time the Nicolai cemetery was quite small for a population of about 8,000 people. Lots of gravesites had to be reused over and over. During the Hussite Wars from 1429 to 1432 gravestones were used to reinforce walls in the town for protection measures, which is the reason why there are no gravestones left from medieval times. The Görlitz-historian Richard Jecht assumes one could find the stones deep below the Hothergasse, were they used.

Tombs in the Nikolai Cemetery

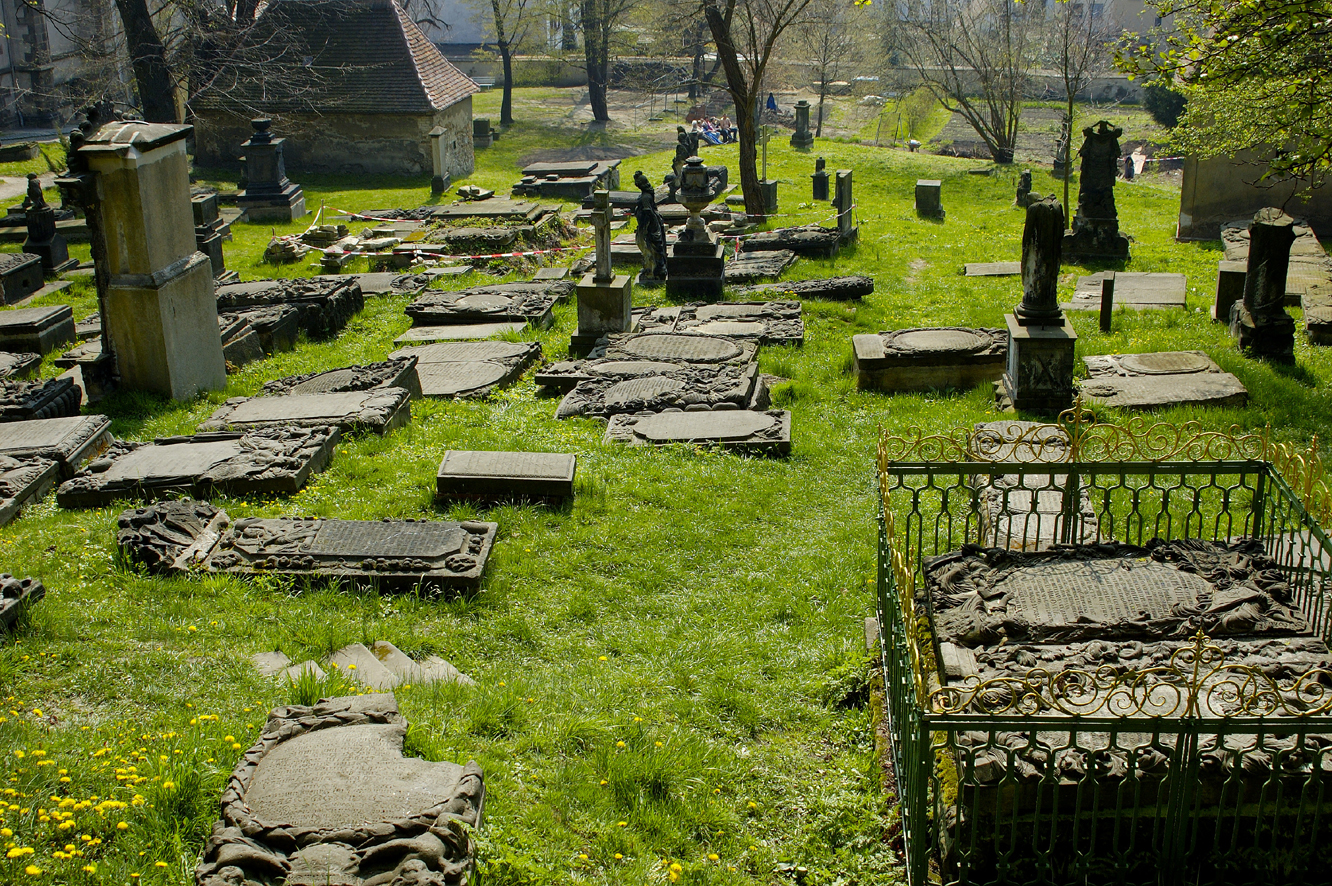
View from the north-side to the west-side

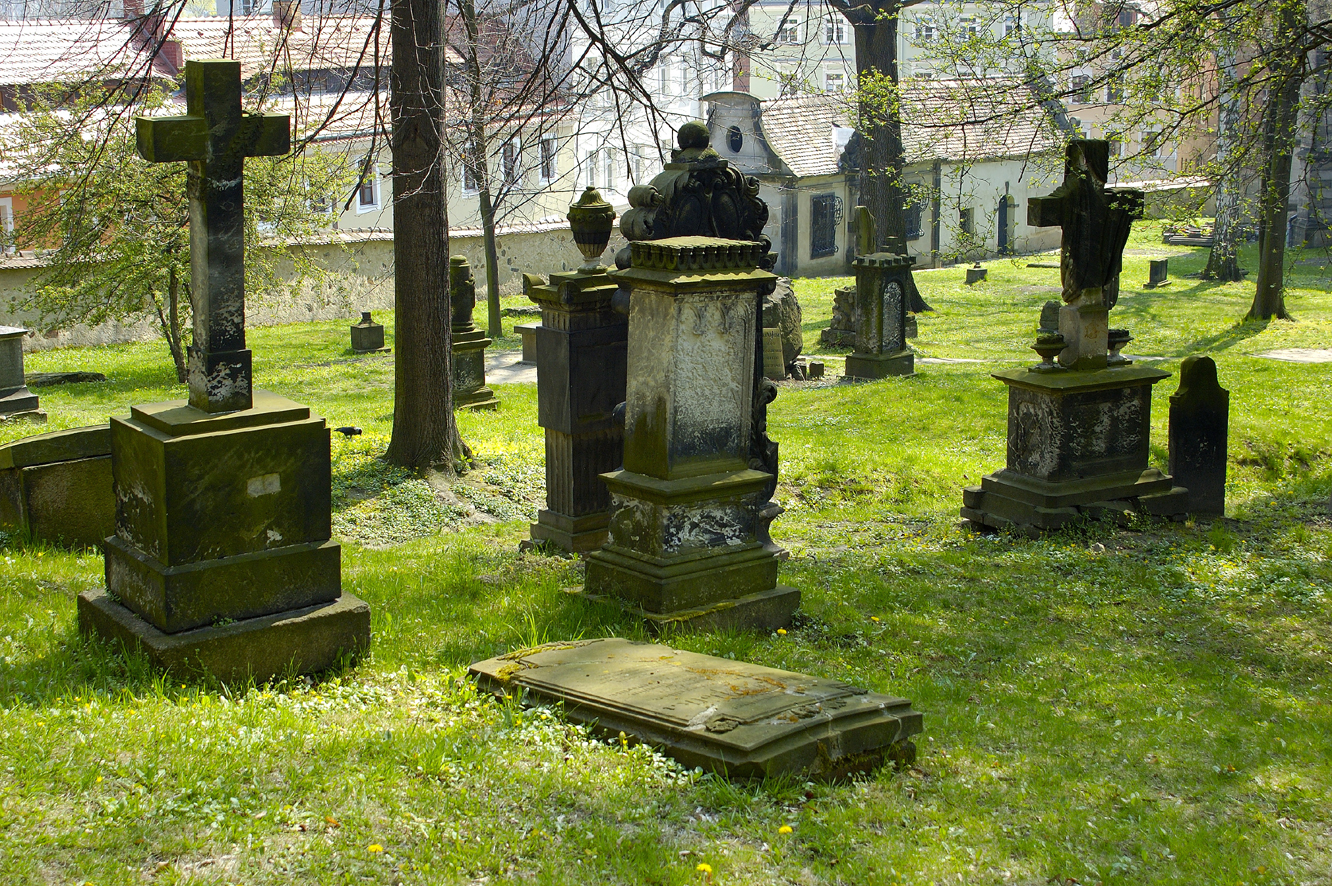
Eastern part of the cemetery

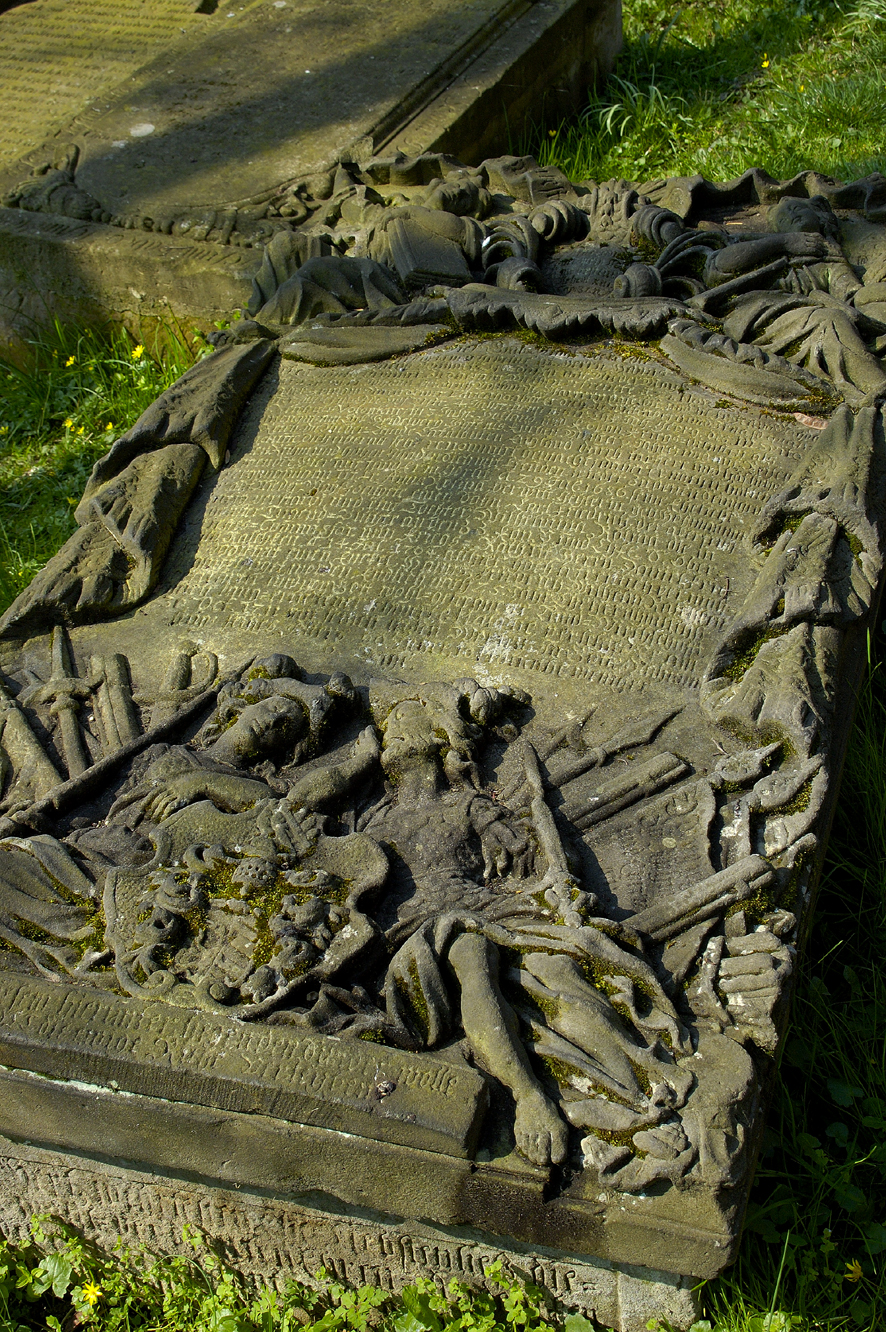
Gravestone from the late 17th century

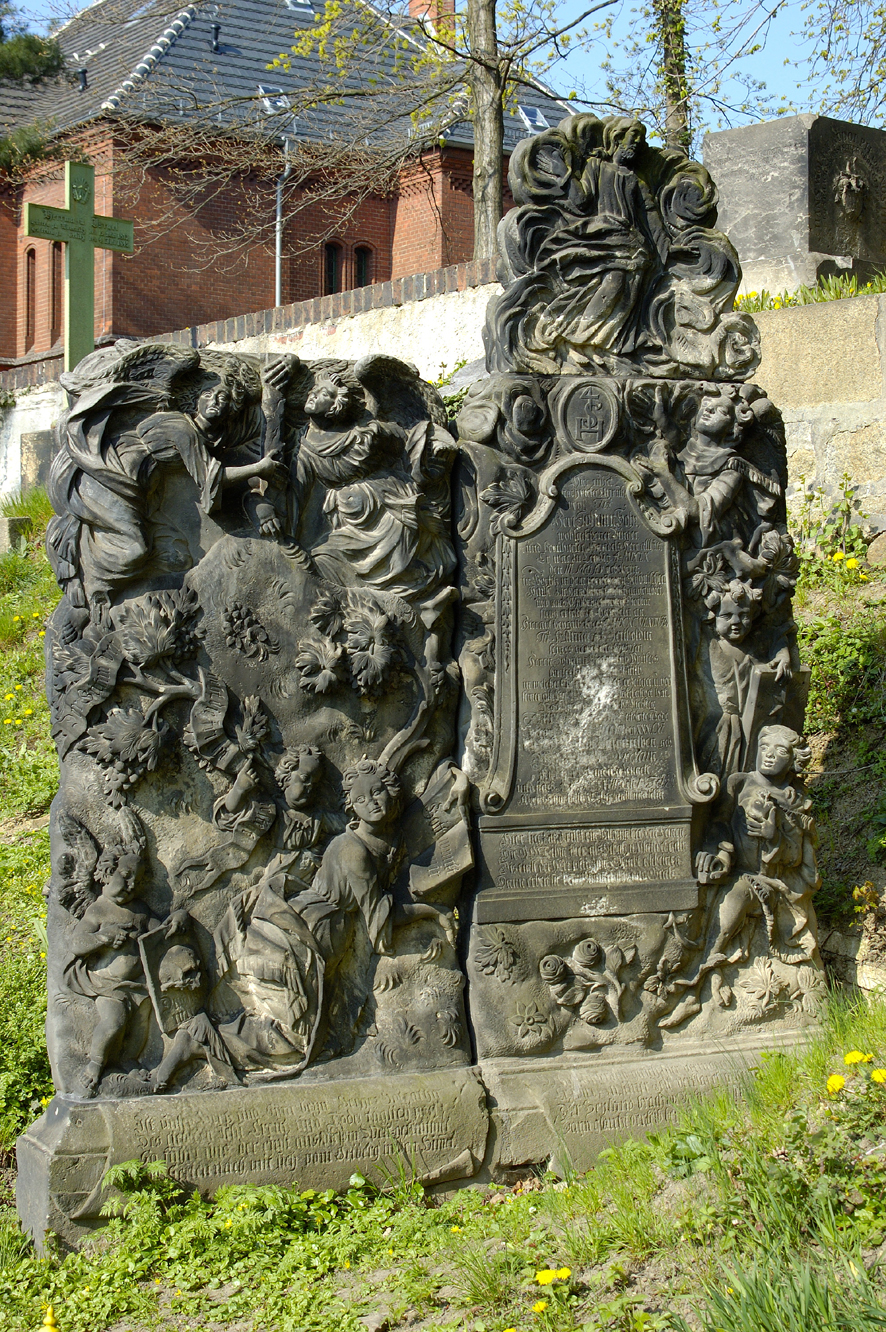
Tomb from the early 18th century

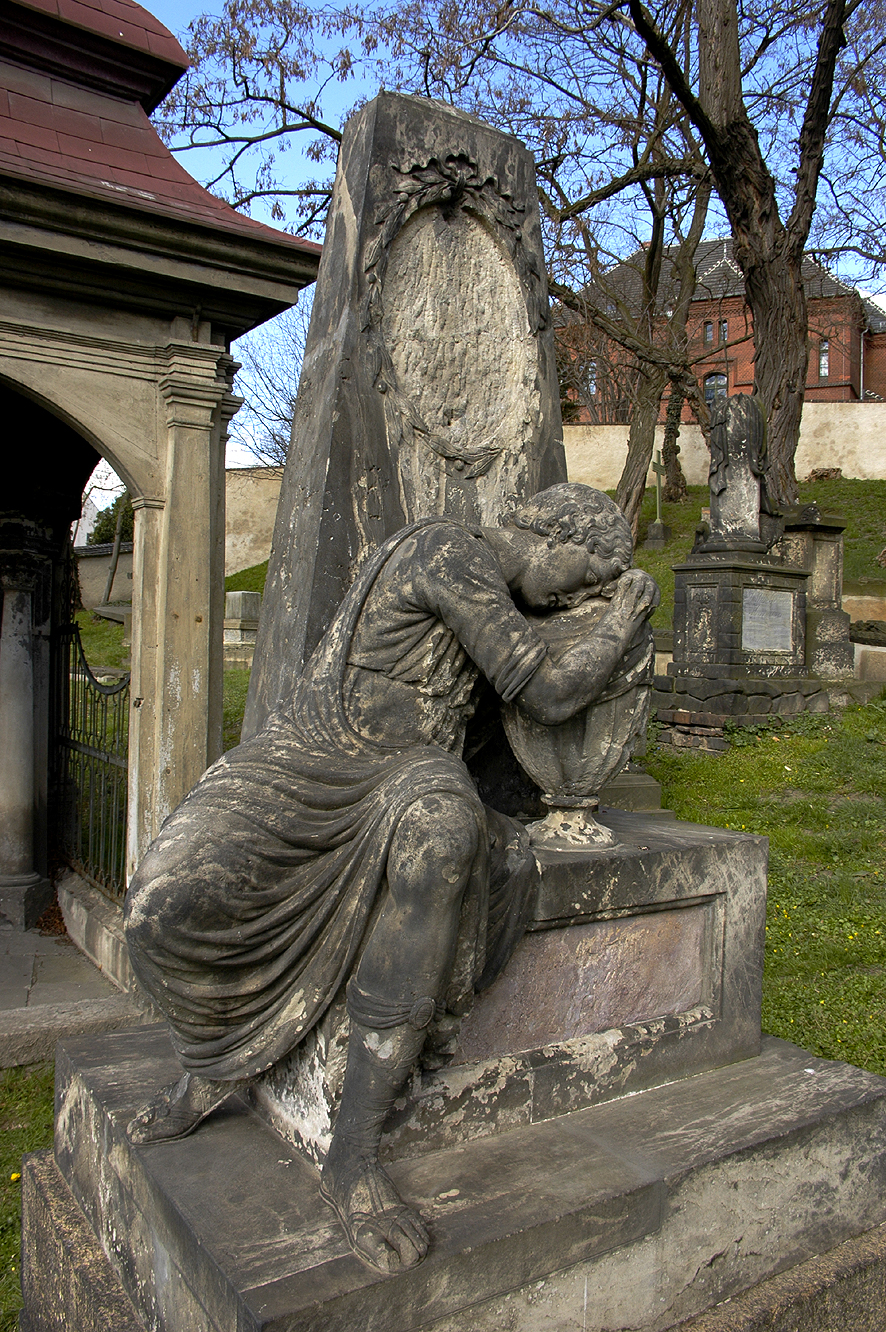
Tomb from 1815

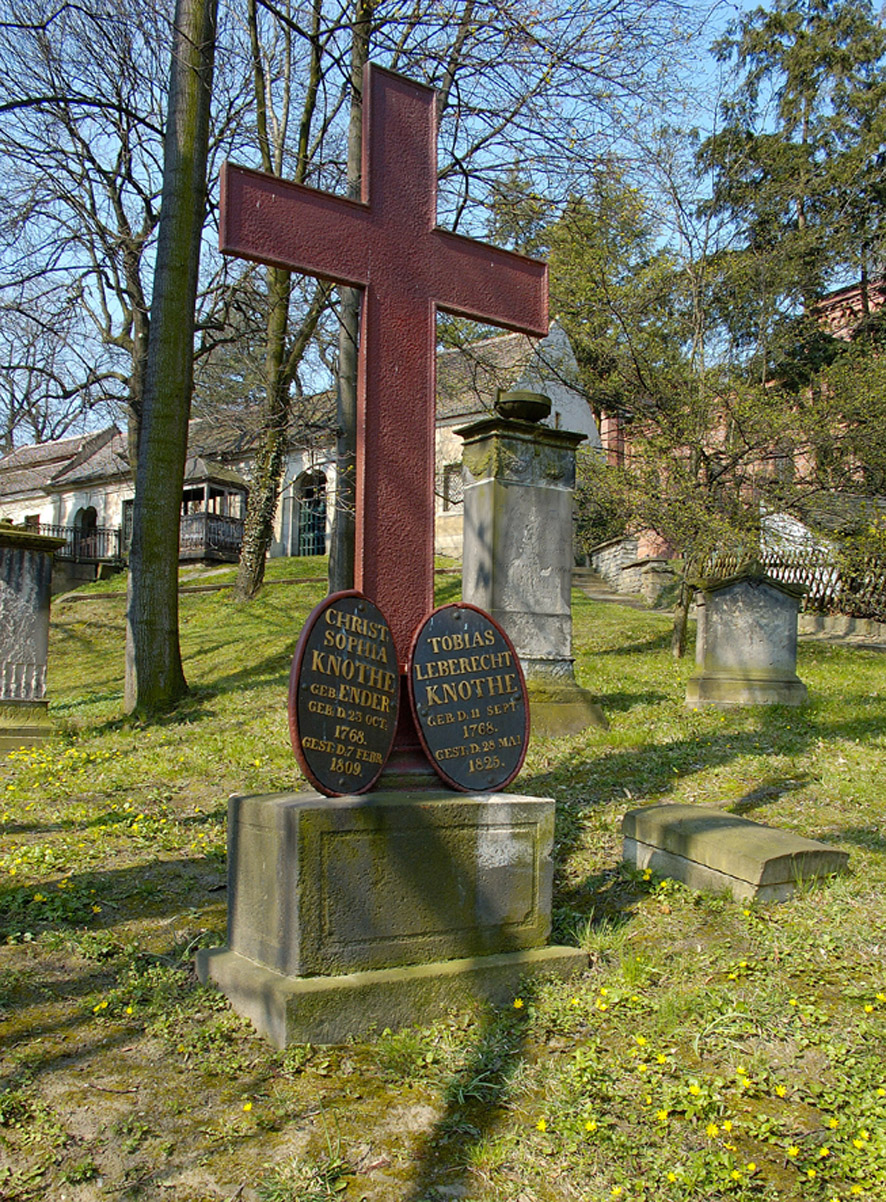
Tomb of cast iron

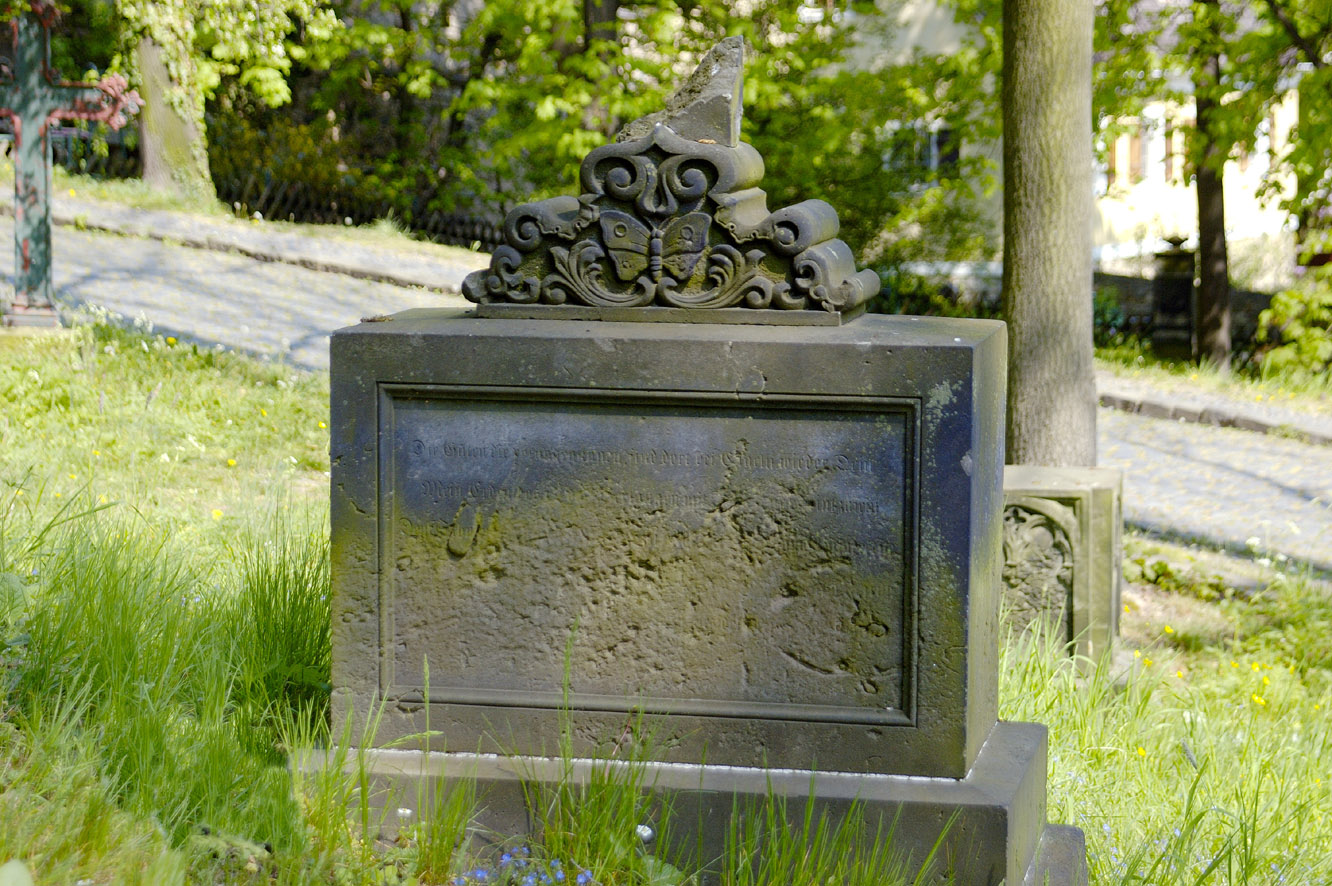
Detail of a gravestone of the early 19th century

== Mausoleums ==
Only 17 of the original 21 mausoleums still exist, with the oldest dating back to 1618 and the bulk of the later structures built during the early 1700s. After a town fire in 1717 damaged the cemetery, some had to be repaired or reconstructed.

Many of the mausoleums feature large altar-like decorations inside the buildings, as well as signs of previous decorations like draperies and portraits of the dead that are housed inside. Mausoleums were only constructed by the richest inhabitants of Görlitz, and the structures served as a way to show off their wealth after death, much like how Egyptian pharaohs were buried in pyramids.

Mausoleums of the Historic Nikolai Cemetery

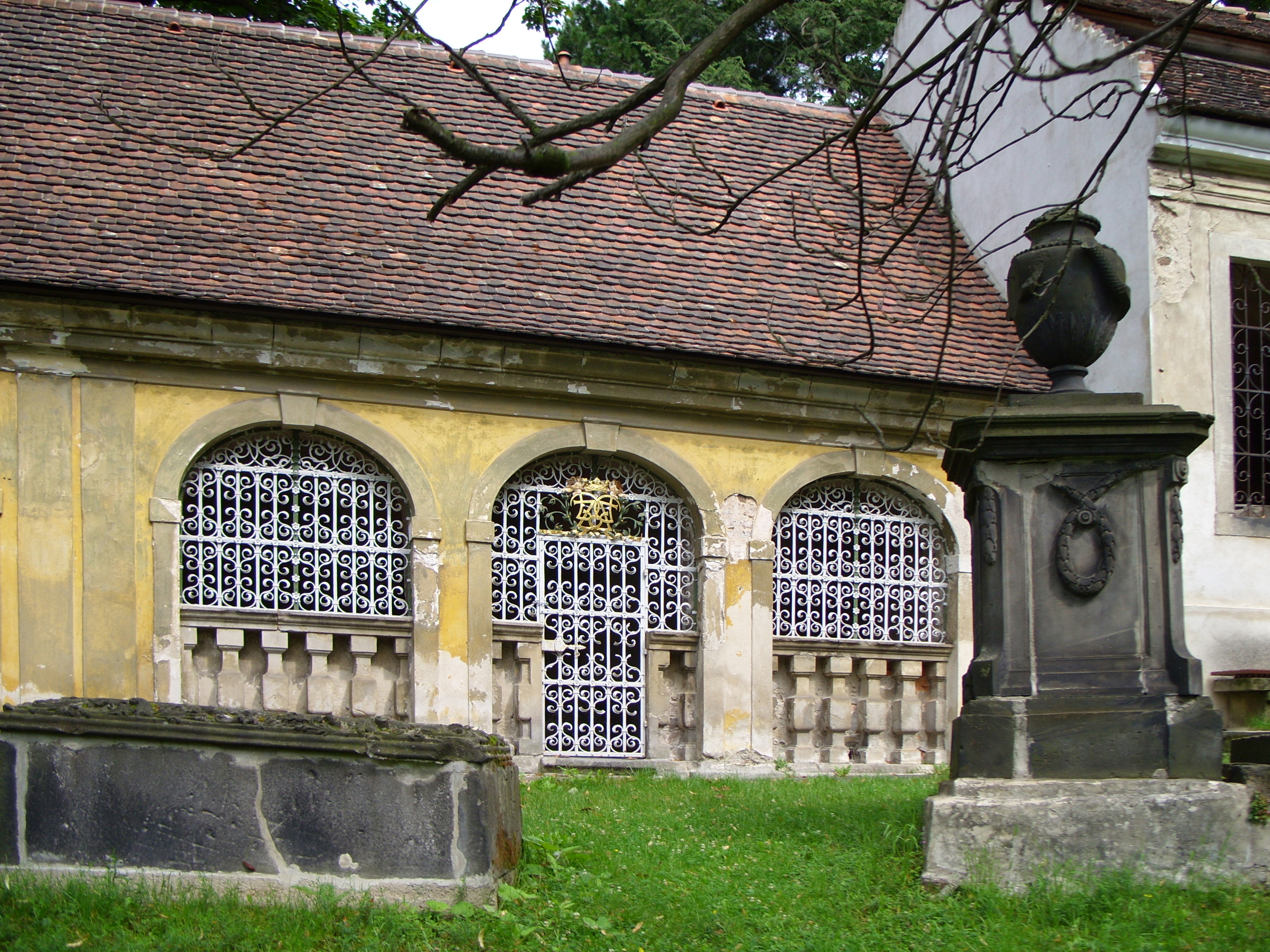
Mausoleum Zobel

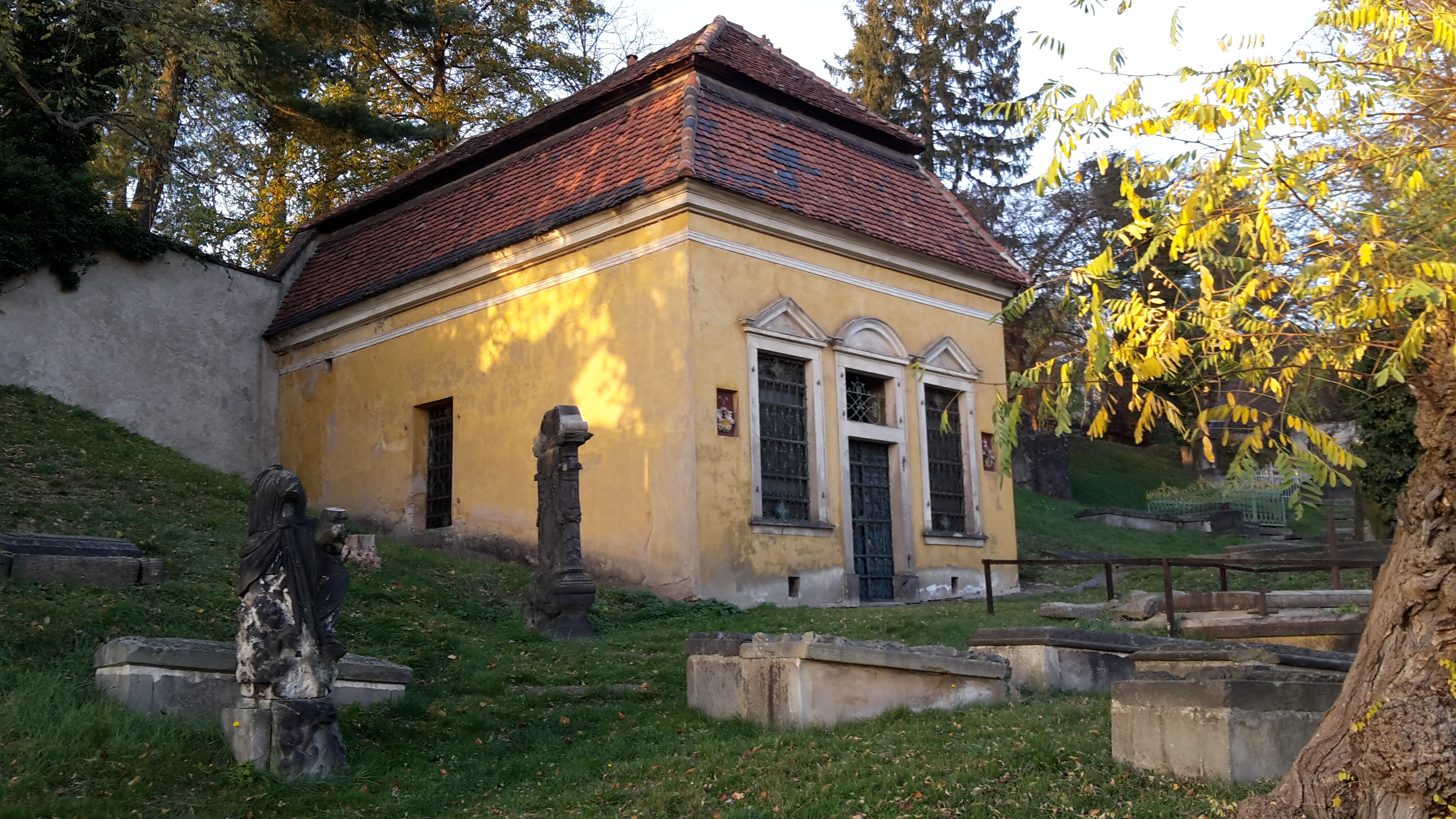
Mausoleum Gobius

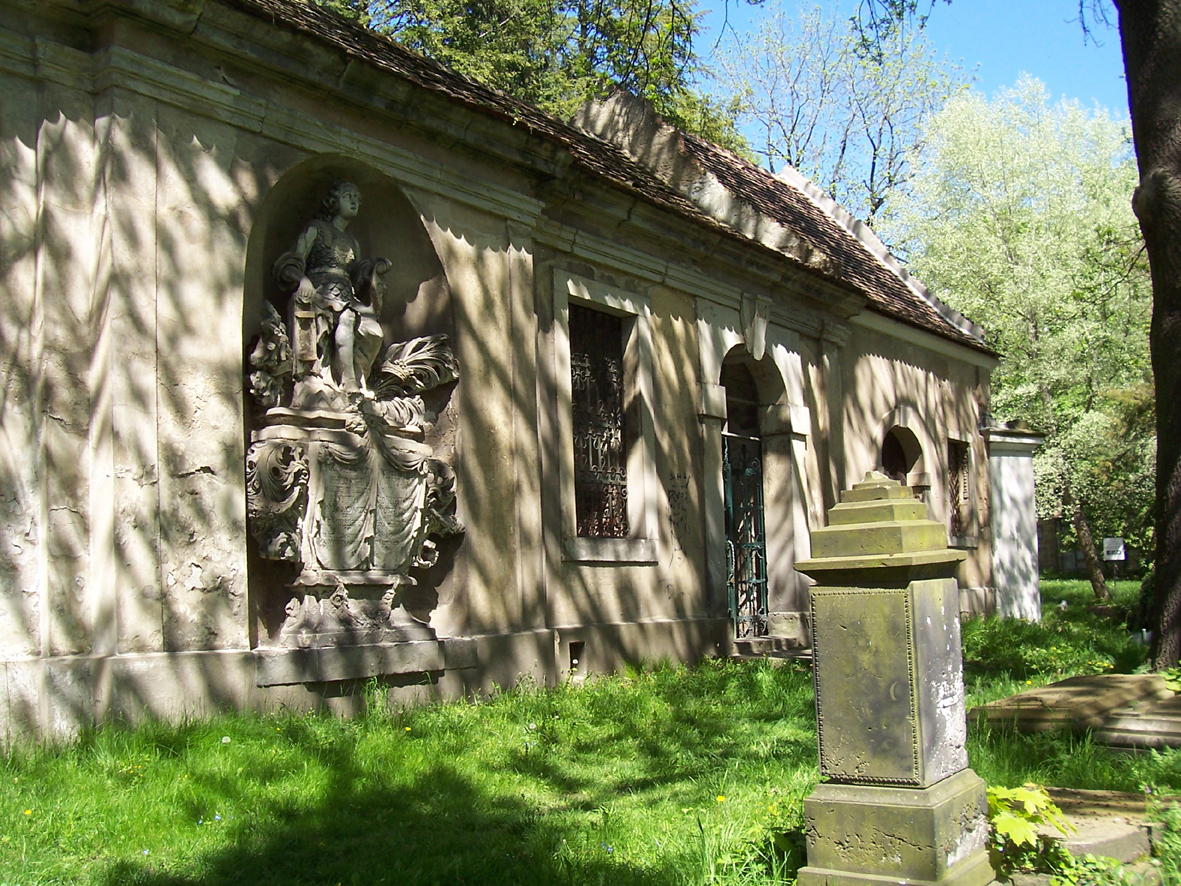
Row of mausoleums

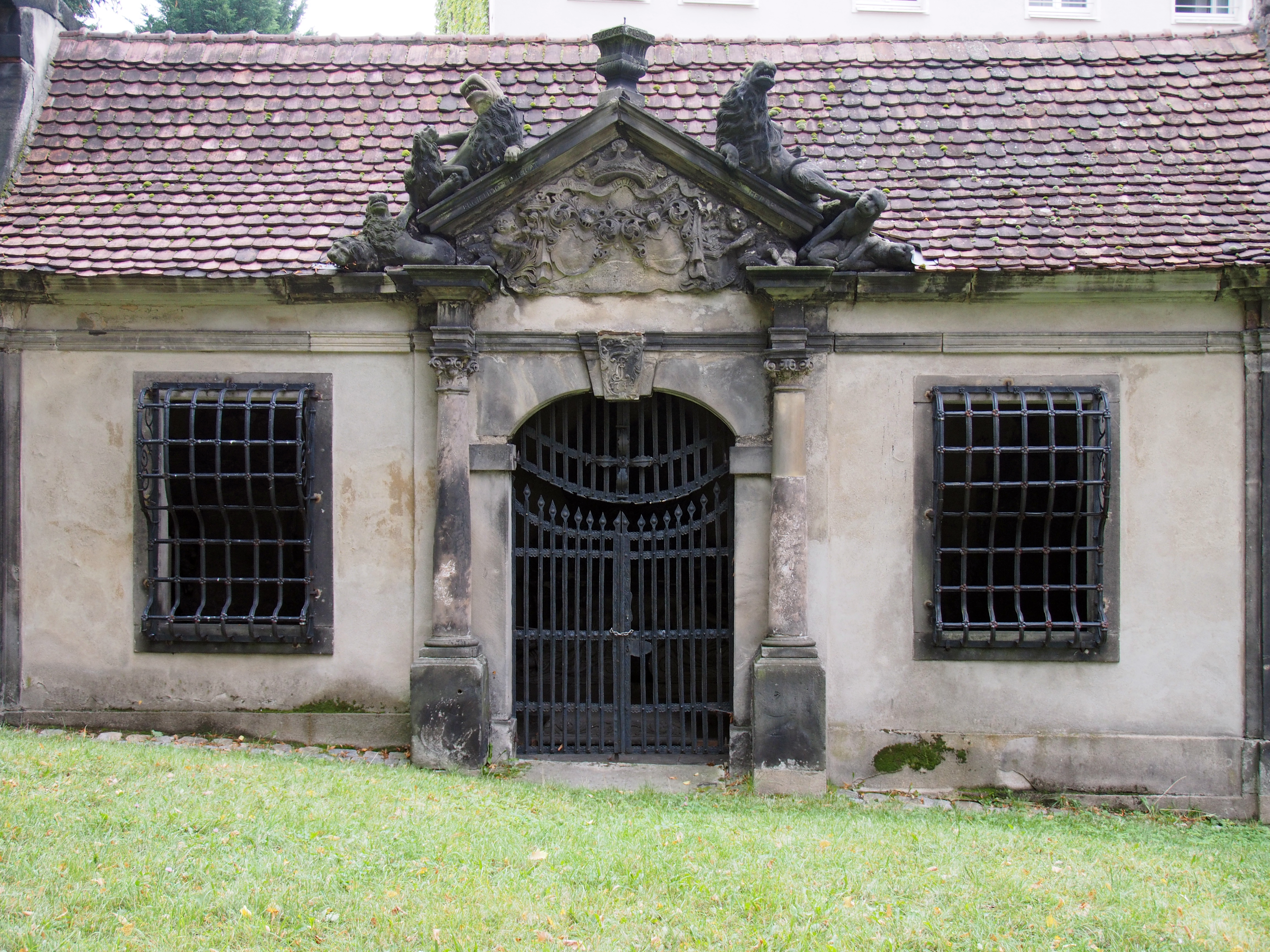
Mausoleum Fröhlich

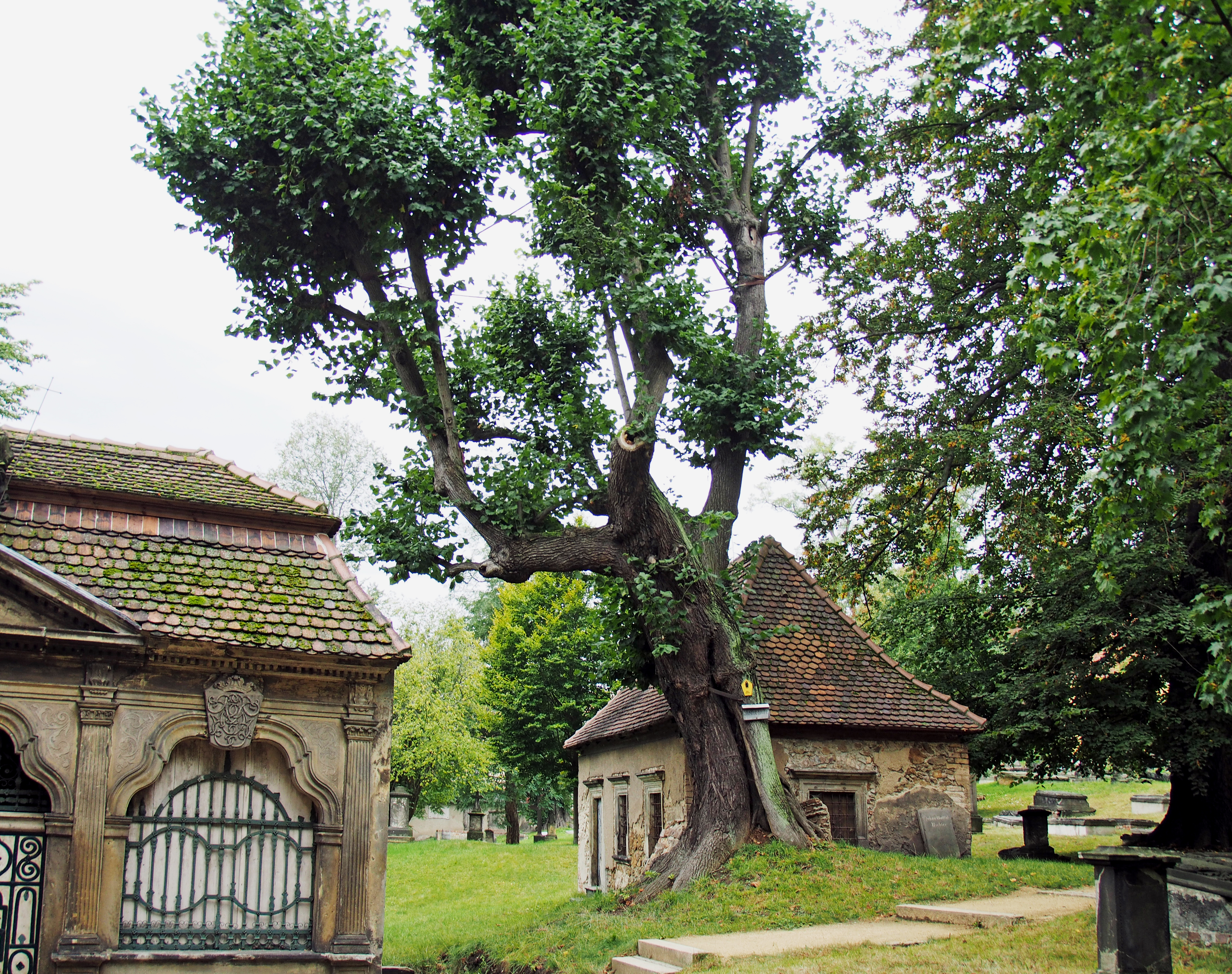
Mausoleum of Jakobi (left) and Gehler (right)

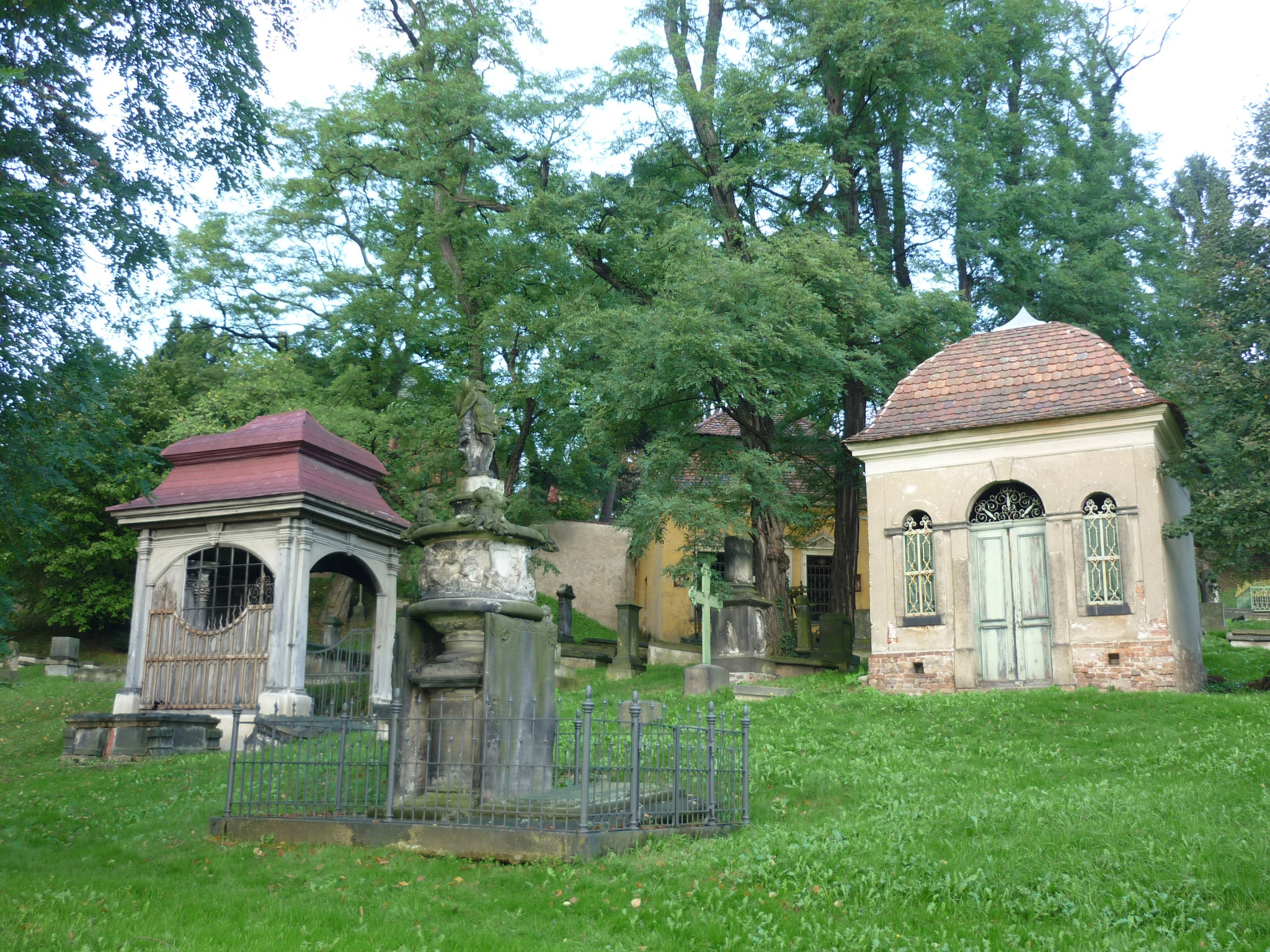
Mausoleum Möller (left) and Tobias (right)

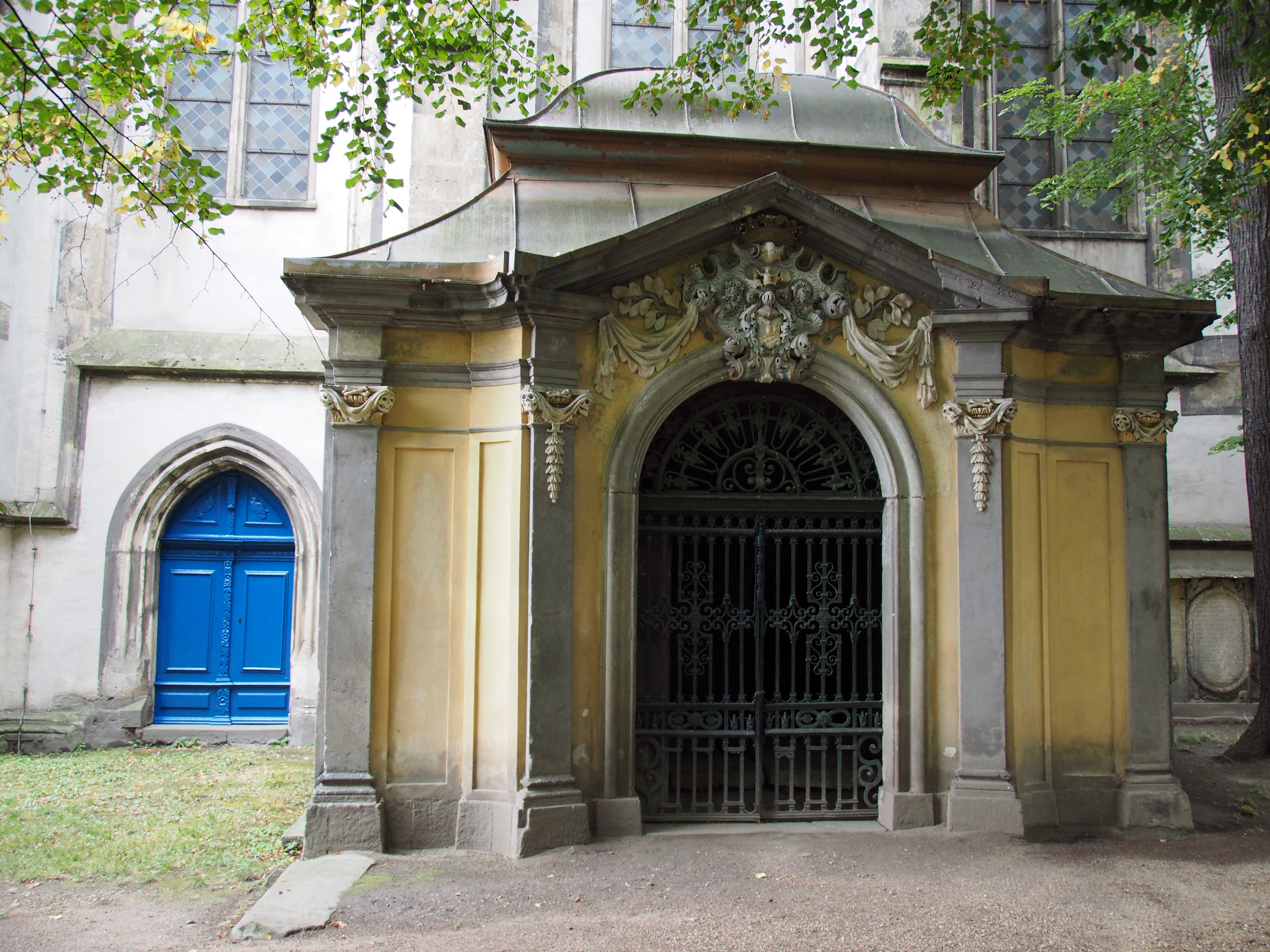
Mausoleum Emmerich

== Prominent People ==
- Georg Emmerich (*1422 in Kłodzko, Bohemia; † 1507 in Görlitz); merchant and mayor of Görlitz
- Jakob Böhme (* 1575 in Stary Zawidów; † 1624 in Görlitz); German philosopher, Christian mystic and theologian
- Johannes Maximilian Avenarius (* 1887 in Greiffenberg; † 1954 in Berlin-Müggelheim); expressionistic artist and illustrator
- Gregor Gobius (* 1588 in Glogau; † 1658 in Görlitz), mayor of Görlitz and alchemist
- Christian August Struve (1767–1807); doctor, pharmacist and poet
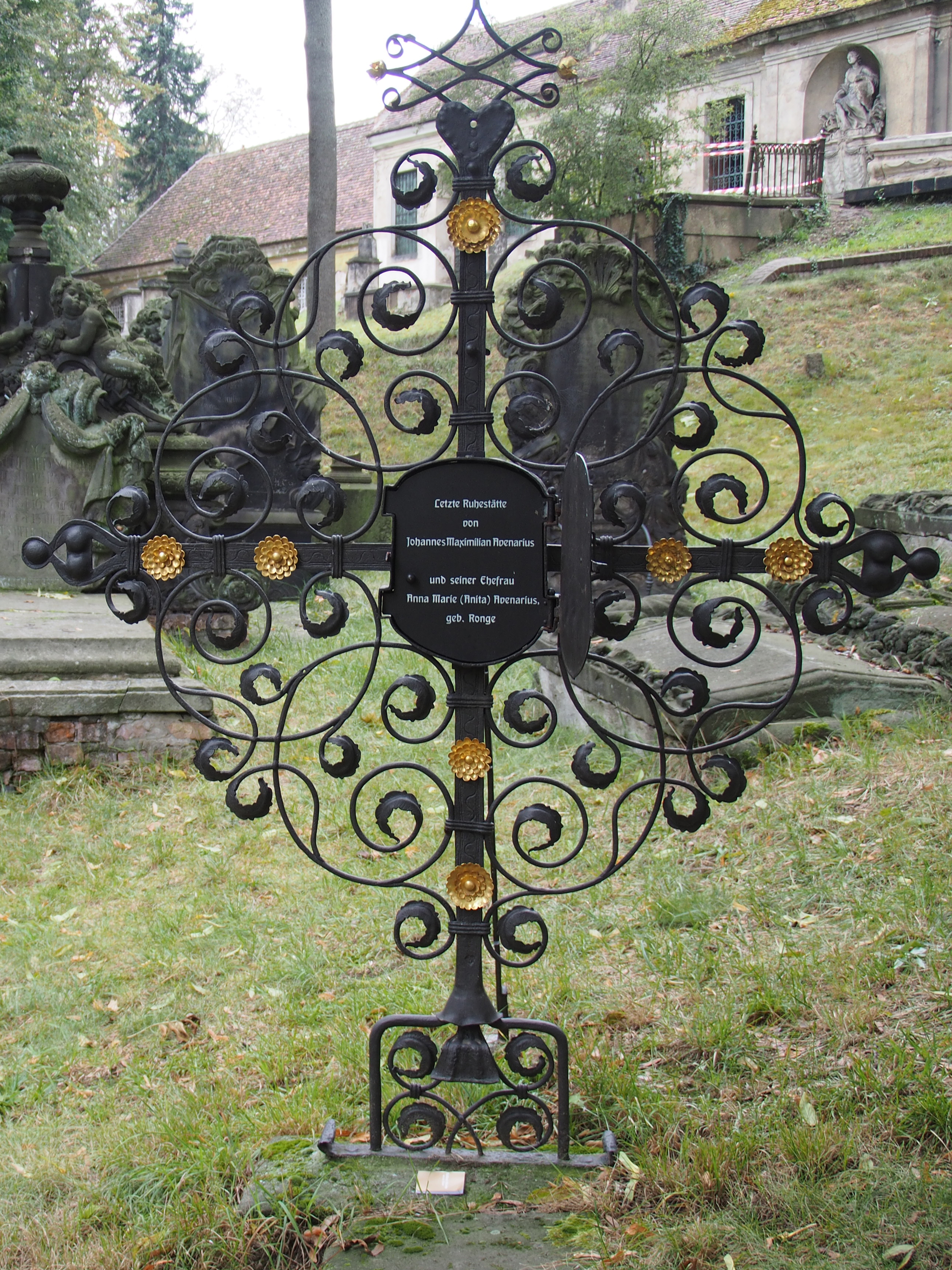
Tomb Johannes M. Avenarius

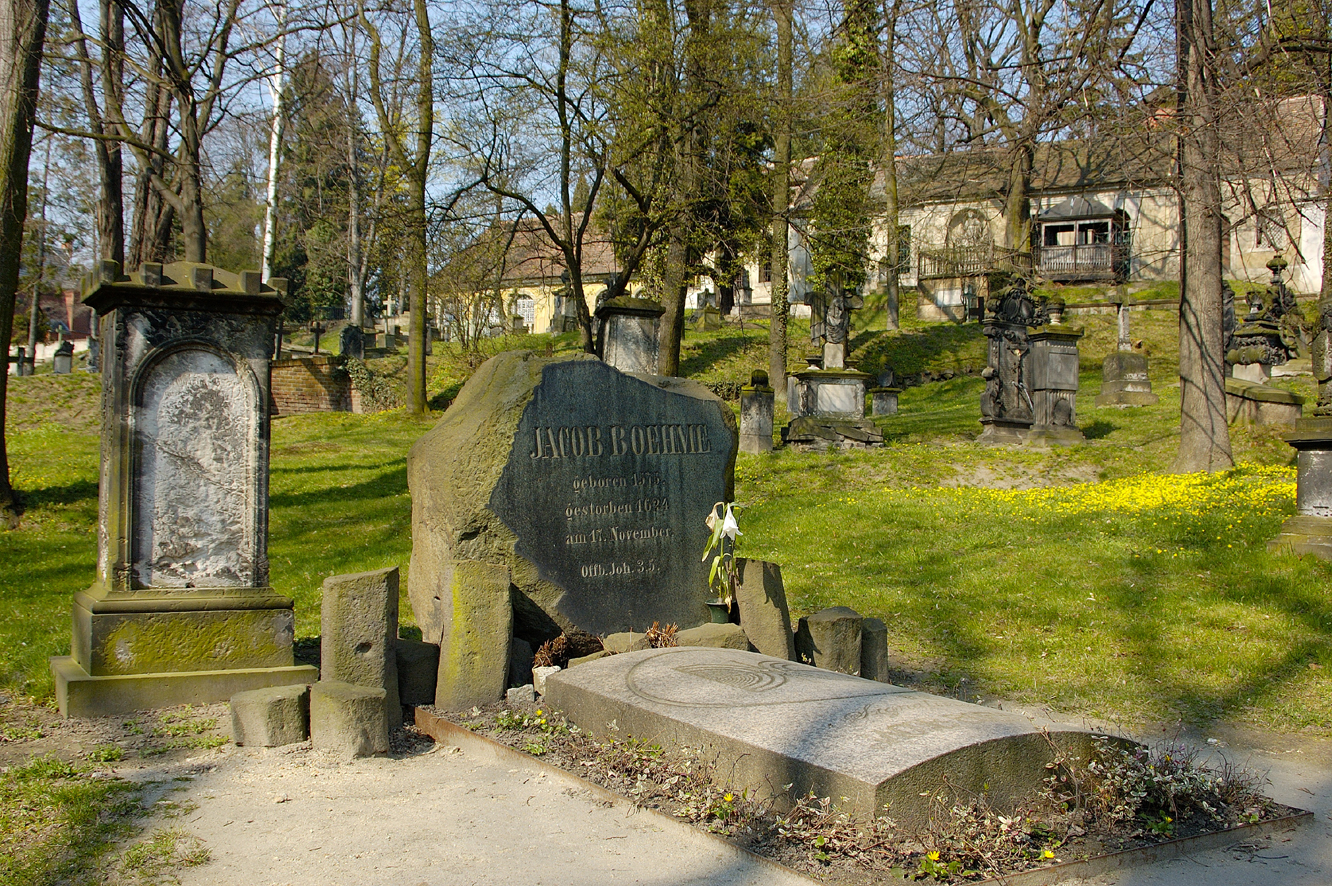
Tomb Jakob Böhme

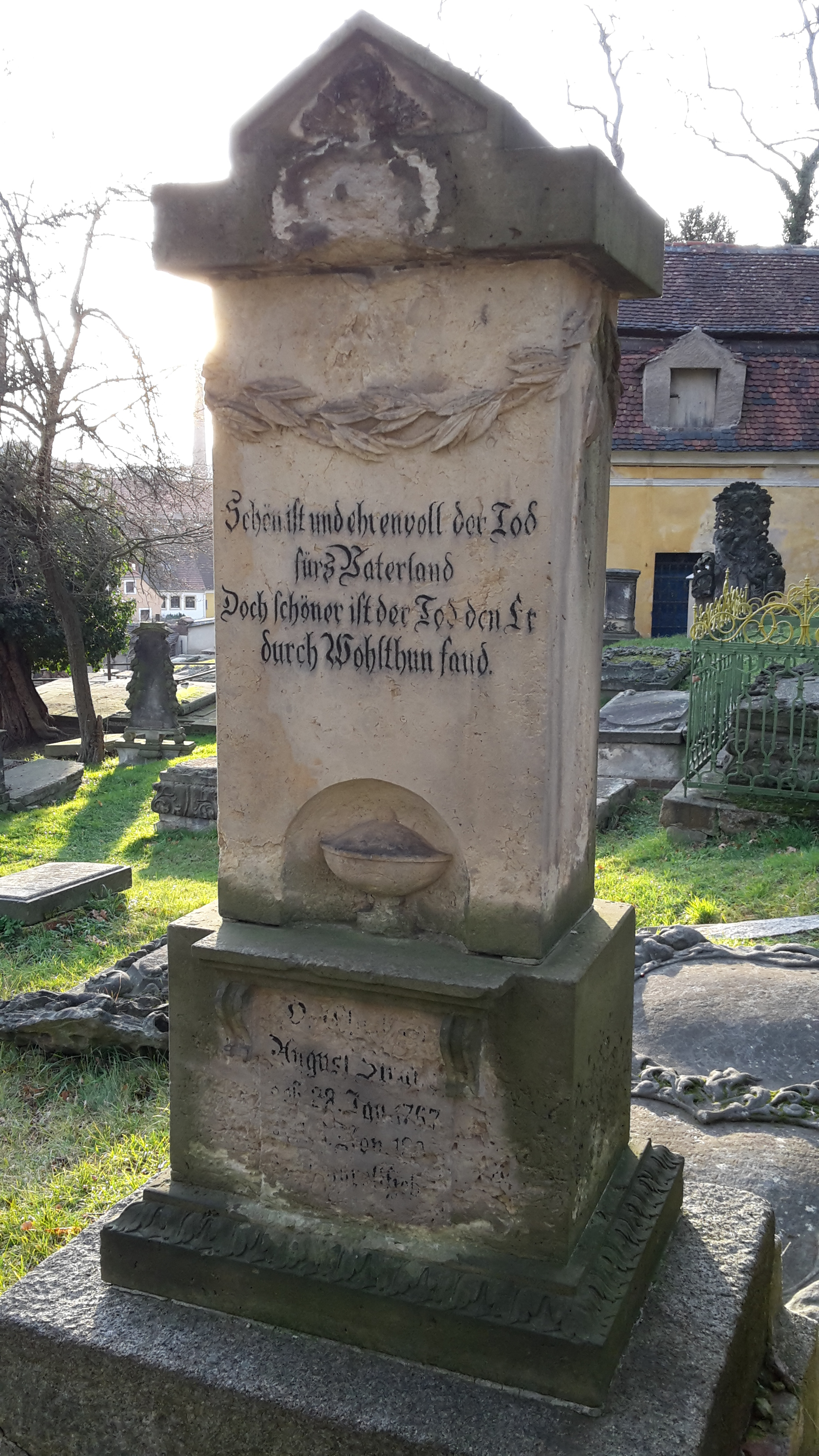
Tomb Christian August Struve

== Literature ==
- Thomas R. Elßner: Wofür steht die Christognosia auf dem Görlitzer Nikolaifriedhof? Ein Deutungsangebot, in: Görlitzer Magazin Nr. 21 (2008), 43–53.
- Günther Grundmann: Die peripherischen Friedhofskapellen des Achtzehnten Jahrhunderts in Schlesien. Straßburg 1916.
- Dietmar Ridder: Der Pestplan auf dem Görlitzer Nikolaifriedhof, in: Denkmalpflege in Görlitz. Eine Schriftenreihe Heft 16, Görlitz, Zittau 2007, 29–35.
- Dietmar Ridder: ein begrebnis solt ja billich ein feiner stiller ort sein. Der Nikolaifriedhof – Denkmal Görlitzer Sepulkralkultur von der Renaissancezeit bis zum 19. Jahrhundert. In: Denkmalpflege in Görlitz. Eine Schriftenreihe, Heft 14, Görlitz, Zittau 2005, 22–42.
- Ulrich Rosner: Oberlausitzer Grufthäuser des Barock. Ein Beitrag zur Sepulkralkunst des 18. Jahrhunderts. In: Denkmalpflege in Sachsen. Mitteilungen des Landesamtes für Denkmalpflege Sachsen. Jahrbuch 2006, Dresden 2007, 24–55.
- Artur Walter: Steine reden. Inschriften der alten Grabsteine und Epitaphien auf dem Nikolaifriedhof, in der Nikolaikirche, an der Frauenkirche, in der Dreifaltigkeitskirche und in der Kirche zu S. S. Peter u. Paul in Görlitz. Manuskript, 1959, OLB IX 310, Bde. 1–7.
- Horst Wenzel, Siegfried Hirche, Siegfried Kaden: St. Nikolai zu Görlitz. Gotteshaus und Kirchhof. Görlitz 1999/2000.
