= Hugo John Belfour =

English poet and cleric

Hugo John Belfour (1802–1827), who used the pseudonym St. John Dorset, was an English poet and cleric.

== Life ==
He was born in or near London, the eldest child of Edward Belfour, of the Navy Office, by his wife Catherine, daughter of John Greenwell, of the India House. In May 1826 he was ordained, and appointed to a curacy in Jamaica, with prospects of preferment. He died in Jamaica in September 1827.

== Works ==
While still 18, Belfour produced The Vampire, a Tragedy in five acts, by St. John Dorset, Tragedy London, 1st and 2nd editions, 1821, and Loveless, another five-act tragedy. The scene is laid in Egypt. The second edition was inscribed "To W. C. Macready, Esq.", to whom the work had been submitted in manuscript. Belfour also wrote Montezuma, a Tragedy in five acts, and other Poems, by St. John Dorset, London, 1822. Both these works are now considered collaborations with George Stephens. St. John Dorset was one of the playwrights included in George Darley's condemnation of followers of Lord Byron, in the "John Lacy Letters".
