= John Abraham Heraud =

English journalist and poet

John Abraham Heraud (1799–1887) was an English journalist and poet. He published two extravagant epic poems, The Descent into Hell (1830), and The Judgment of the Flood (1834). He also wrote plays and travel books.

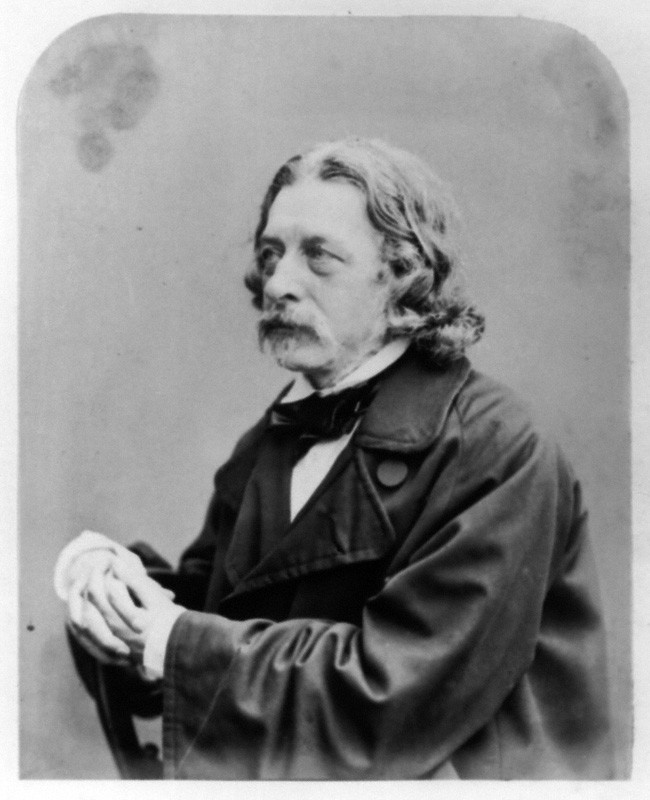
John Abraham Heraud, photograph of the 1850s

== Life ==
He was born in the parish of St Andrew's, Holborn, London, on 5 July 1799. His father, James Abraham Heraud, of Huguenot descent, was a law stationer, and died at Tottenham, Middlesex, on 6 May 1846, having married Jane, daughter of John and Elizabeth Hicks; she died 2 August 1850. John Abraham, the son, was privately educated, and originally destined for business, but in 1818 began writing for the magazines.

Heraud had a large circle of literary acquaintances, including Samuel Taylor Coleridge, Robert Southey, William Wordsworth, and John Gibson Lockhart. Southey was a correspondent, who thought Heraud capable of learning anything, except "how to check his own exuberance in verse", as he wrote to Robert Gooch.

Heraud wrote for the Quarterly Review and other reviews, and from 1830 to 1833 assisted in editing Fraser's Magazine. There he was sub-editor to William Maginn, taking on literary criticism and philosophy. At this period he was still in partnership with his father, in legal stationery. The partnership was dissolved in 1841, when he went into the trade on his own in the Chancery Lane area, but unsuccessfully.

With the Carlyles Heraud was very close. Thomas Carlyle was well aware of Heraud assiduously cultivating favour, and of James Fraser's opinion that Heraud was "mad as a March hare", writing to Jane Carlyle about him in 1834.

Heraud edited The Sunbeam. A Journal devoted to Polite Literature, in 1838 and 1839; the Monthly Magazine from 1839 to 1842; and subsequently the Christian's Monthly Magazine. In 1843 he became a contributor to The Athenæum, and later served as its dramatic critic until his retirement in 1868. From 1849 to 1879 he was also the dramatic critic of the Illustrated London News. In 1869 he used that position to call for censorship of Formosa, Dion Boucicault's "courtesan play", prompting William Bodham Donne of the Lord Chamberlain's Office to tighten up licensing of drama with sexual overtones.

In the late 1840s friends were trying to sort out Heraud's financial problems, amounting to insolvency; a fund-raising committee was formed, with officers John Forster, Thomas Kibble Hervey and John Westland Marston. On 21 July 1873, on the nomination of William Gladstone, he was appointed a brother of the London Charterhouse, where he died on 20 April 1887. He was buried in Islington Cemetery on 23 April 1887.

== The Syncretics ==
Heraud was identified as a leading figure in the "Syncretics", a proto-aesthetic group mocked in Punch and prominent around 1840. After a few years the excitement around their eclectic approach subsided. A biographer of Ralph Waldo Emerson, who initially took a great interest, has called Heraud in particular a "general failure".

=== The group ===
Other Syncretics were Francis Foster Barham, Richard Henry Horne, and John Westland Marston. Barham and Heraud founded the Syncretic Society, or Syncretic Association. It grew out of an earlier group round James Pierrepont Greaves, the "Aesthetic Society" or "Aesthetic Institution", based in Burton Street on the north side of Bloomsbury, with a core of Greaves and a few neighbours. Heraud and Barham took over the Monthly Magazine, and it functioned as the organ of the group in the period 1839 to 1841. Camilla Toulmin gained the impression in 1841, visiting Horne, that there was a group of younger and ambitious men in the Syncretics, besides the better-known names. For example, the Syncretics took up the Festus of Philip James Bailey.

=== Transatlantic ties ===
The group also found kinship with, and encouragement from, the New England transcendentalists. Bronson Alcott corresponded with Greaves. He also sent books to Greaves and Heraud; Greaves sent back books including Heraud's Lecture on Poetic Genius. Approval of the Monthly Magazine was strong from Alcott, Convers Francis and George Ripley. Heraud published one piece from New England in 1839, an oration by Robert Bartlett. It proved a false start, though. Later in the year the transcendentalists founded their own periodical, The Dial, along the same lines.

Writing in The Dial in 1842, Emerson in his article English Reformers praised Heraud as an interpreter of Jakob Boehme and Emanuel Swedenborg; and referenced his papers Foreign Aids to Self Intelligence, which had been announced as a three-volume work. Heraud took Emerson to be a disciple of Carlyle, and was contradicted in The Present. A few years later he was explaining that Swedenborg was to be taken only as an example and inspiration, since the transcendentalist approach was at odds with an established church. It was through the pages of the Monthly Magazine that two notable Swedenborgians, James John Garth Wilkinson and Henry James Sr., came to know each other.

Carlyle in fact disapproved of the group around Heraud and Alcott House, Greaves's project. These included John Goodwyn Barmby, Newton Crosland, Horne, Henry Mansel, and James Elishama Smith.

=== Drama activism ===
A series of public lectures by the Syncretic Association started early in 1841. Bayle Bernard was one of the speakers, and the talks took place in the Suffolk Street Gallery, London. A circumstantial account, "Damned" Tragedies, was given in the July 1842 Fraser's Magazine. Bernard's talk was light-hearted chat about actors, but Heraud and Frederick Guest Tomlins addressed more serious aspects and limitations of current British theatre, before the weekly series outstayed its welcome at the Gallery.

The Syncretics, who included also George Stephens, became active in agitation to have unperformed drama staged. The context was the restriction in London to three theatres with patents, and an absence of new verse drama productions. Not short of ambition, the Dramatic Committee of the Association, through Heraud, pressed for a reformed and poetic theatre, an actors' joint stock company, and the performance of new work, as well as drama schools to elevate taste. A failed demonstration, Martinuzzi of 1841, written by Stephens, led to Heraud in particular being lampooned in Punch, by William Makepeace Thackeray. The existing theatrical monopoly was, however, abolished by the Theatres Act 1843.

Heraud himself wrote dramas and persisted. The tragedy of Videna, based on Geoffrey of Monmouth, was acted at the Marylebone Theatre in 1854, with James William Wallack; and Wife or No Wife and a version of Ernest Legouvé's Medea were staged later.

== Heraud as poet ==
Harper's Cyclopædia of British and American poetry noted that as a poet, Heraud had been snubbed by the critics, "and not always unjustly". It also repeated the story attributed to Douglas Jerrold, asked by Heraud whether he had seen "his Descent into Hell", and replying that he'd like to. Heraud made two attempts at epic grandeur in his poems The Descent into Hell, 1830, and The Judgment of the Flood, 1834. The view of Chambers's Cyclopædia of English Literature was that he attempted in poetry what John Martin did in art: the vast, the remote, and the terrible. It found his Descent and Judgment to be "psychological curiosities" of "misplaced power". George Saintsbury put Heraud on a level with Edwin Atherstone, and above Robert Pollok. Herbert Tucker regards the Judgement of the Flood as "deranged", but has more time for the Descent into Hell. He places it with other, earlier attempts to dramatise Christian typology, such as those of William Gilbank and Elizabeth Smith of Birmingham. He notes Heraud's familiarity with Coleridge's apologetics, and his reference to Martin in the annotations.

Heraud later wrote a political epic, which remained unpublished. This work was under the influence of William James Linton.

== Works ==
Heraud was the author of:

- The Legend of St. Loy, with other Poems, 1820.
- Tottenham, a poem, 1820.
- The Descent into Hell, a poem, 1830; second edition, to which are added Uriel, a fragment, and three odes.
- A Philosophical Estimate of the Controversy respecting the Divine Humanity, 1831.
- An Oration on the Death of S. T. Coleridge, 1834.
- The Judgment of the Flood, a poem, 1834; new ed. 1857.
- Substance of a Lecture on Poetic Genius as a Moral Power, 1837.
- Voyages up the Mediterranean of William Robinson, with Memoirs, 1837.
- Expediency and Means of Elevating the Profession of the Educator, a prize essay, printed in the Educator, 1839, pp. 133–260. The other prize winners were John Lalor, Edward Higginson, James Simpson, and Sarah Ricardo-Porter.
- The Life and Times of Girolamo Savonarola: Illustrating the Progress of the Reformation in Italy, During the Fifteenth century. Whittaker. 1843.
- Salvator, the Poor Man of Naples, a dramatic poem, privately printed, 1845,
- Videna, or the Mother's Tragedy. A Legend of Early Britain, 1854.
- The British Empire, written with Sir Archibald Alison and others, 1856.
- Henry Butler's Theatrical Directory and Dramatic Almanack, editor, 1860.
- Shakespeare, his Inner Life as intimated in his Works, 1865.
- The Wreck of the London, a lyrical ballad, 1866.
- The In-Gathering, Cimon and Pero, a Chain of Sonnets, Sebastopol, 1870.
- The War of Ideas, a poem, 1871. Based on the Franco-Prussian War.
- Uxmal: an Antique Love Story. Macée de Léodepart: an Historical Romance, 1877.
- The Sibyl among the Tombs, 1886.

Heraud's knowledge of German was unusual; he was a follower of Friedrich Schelling. He is also regarded as a disciple of Coleridge.

== Family ==
On 15 May 1823 Heraud married, at Old Lambeth Church, Ann Elizabeth, daughter of Henry Baddams, and by her, who died at Islington on 21 September 1867, had two children, Claudius William Heraud of Woodford, and Edith Heraud, an actress.

== Notes ==
Attribution

This article incorporates text from a publication now in the public domain: Stephen, Leslie; Lee, Sidney, eds. (1891). "Heraud, John Abraham". Dictionary of National Biography. Vol. 26. London: Smith, Elder & Co.
