= Valentin Weigel =

German theologian, philosopher and mystical writer (1533–1588)

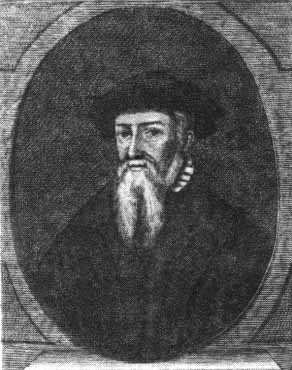
image of Valentin Weigel

Valentin Weigel (or Weichel; 7 August 1533 – 10 June 1588) was a German theologian, pastor, philosopher and mystical writer, from Saxony, and an important precursor of later theosophy. In English, he is often called Valentine Weigel.

== Biography ==
Weigel was born in Hayn, near Dresden, into a Catholic family. He studied at Meissen, Leipzig, and Wittenberg. In 1567, he became a Lutheran pastor in Zschopau, near Chemnitz. There, he lived out a quiet life, engaged in his writings.

He died in Zschopau.

== Beliefs ==
Weigel was best known for his belief that the Virgin Mary was herself the product of a virgin birth. He based his belief on the idea of the Immaculate Conception, which required that Mary must also be sinless in order to bear God in the flesh of a human that defecates daily. He kept his ideas secret, entrusting them only to personal friends (in contrast to Jakob Böhme). He carried out his parochial duties and kept a low profile. He left around 6000 pages in printed or manuscript works. His ideas on human nature were only gradually and posthumously published. Johann Arndt, Gottfried Arnold, and Gottfried Leibniz helped to spread Weigel's ideas. His teachings are known as Weigelianism.

His mysticism was marked by that of Johannes Tauler and by doctrines of Paracelsus; he was also a follower of Sebastian Franck and Caspar Schwenckfeldt. Like these two latter, he emphasized the inner life. He advocated a "spiritual church" in which one could know Christ without books or scripture.

== Works ==
- Unterrichts-Predigt: Wie man christlich trauern und täglich solle im Herrn sterben, 1576
- Libellus de vita beata, 1609
- Ein schön Gebetsbüchlein, welches die Einfältigen unterrichtet, 1612
- Der güldene Griff, alle Ding ohne Irrtum zu erkennen, 1613
- Ein nützliches Traktätlein vom Ort der Welt, 1613
- Dialogus de Christianismo, 1614
- Erkenne dich selbst, 1615
- Informatorium oder Kurzer Unterricht, 1616 (expanded: Soli deo gloria, 1618)
- Kirchen- oder Hauspostill, 1618
- Libellus disputatorus, 1618
- De bono et malo in homine, 1618
- Zwei schöne Büchlein, 1618
- Studium universale, 1618
- Tractatus de opere mirabili, 1619
