= Dionysius Andreas Freher =

Dionysius Andreas Freher (12 September 1649 – 5 December 1728) was a Christian mystical and alchemical writer, most famous for his extensive commentaries on Jacob Boehme. He was born in Germany but spent most of his life in London, England.

== Works ==
The Paradoxical Emblems of Dionysius Andreas Freher, edited by Adam McLean.
Hermetic Behmenists: writings from Dionysius Andreas Freher and Francis Lee, edited by John Madziarczyk.
