= George Stephens (playwright) =

English author and dramatist

George Stephens (1800–1851) was an English author and dramatist. He enjoyed little apparent success, but one of his dramas played a part in the campaign of the Syncretic Society to lift licensing restrictions in London, and have more serious and new drama performed.

== Life ==
Stephens was born at Chelsea, London on 8 March 1800; much of his life remains obscure. In later life he suffered reverses of fortune. He died at Pratt Terrace, Camden Town, London, on 15 October 1851. His widow Ellen died on 11 August 1866, aged 56. They had a son and daughter.

== Works ==
Three works published under the pseudonym of St. John Dorset have been thought early productions by Stephens. At least two of them, The Vampire: a tragedy, 1821, and Montezuma: a tragedy, 1822, have also been taken to have been written by Hugo John Belfour; and the third, a volume of poems, to be a joint production of Belfour and Stephens.

In 1835 Stephens published The Manuscript of Erdély, a romance, 3 vols. This was followed by The Voice of the Pulpit, being Sermons on various subjects, 1839 (preface dated Bromley Hall, Herts, 28 November 1838); Gertrude and Beatrice, or the Queen of Hungary: a tragedy in five acts, 1839; and Père La Chaise, or the Confessor, 1840, 3 vols.

On 26 August 1841 Stephens saw his tragedy Martinuzzi, or the Hungarian Daughter produced at the English Opera House. Martinuzzi was an attempt, backed by the "Syncretic Society" of litterateurs, to break an existing monopoly in theatrical London. By the device of introducing songs, it was gratuitously converted into a musical drama, to get round the law which limited the performance of five-act dramas to the three "patent houses" and the Haymarket Theatre. Samuel Phelps and Mary Amelia Warner took the main roles, and the piece kept the stage for a month, though the critics were not impressed.

In 1846 Stephens wrote Dramas for the Stage, two privately printed volumes containing Nero, Forgery, Sensibility, and Philip Basil, or a Poet's Fate, four tragedies; Self-Glorification, a Chinese play; and Rebecca and her Daughter, a comedy. He also wrote the introduction to the Church of England Quarterly Review, 1837, with an article, "The Slumber of the Pulpit". Other works were The Patriot, a tragedy, 1849; and The Justification of War as the Medium of Civilisation, 1850.

== Notes ==
Attribution

This article incorporates text from a publication now in the public domain: Lee, Sidney, ed. (1898). "Stephens, George (1800-1851)". Dictionary of National Biography. Vol. 54. London: Smith, Elder & Co.
