= Stary Zawidów =

- Village
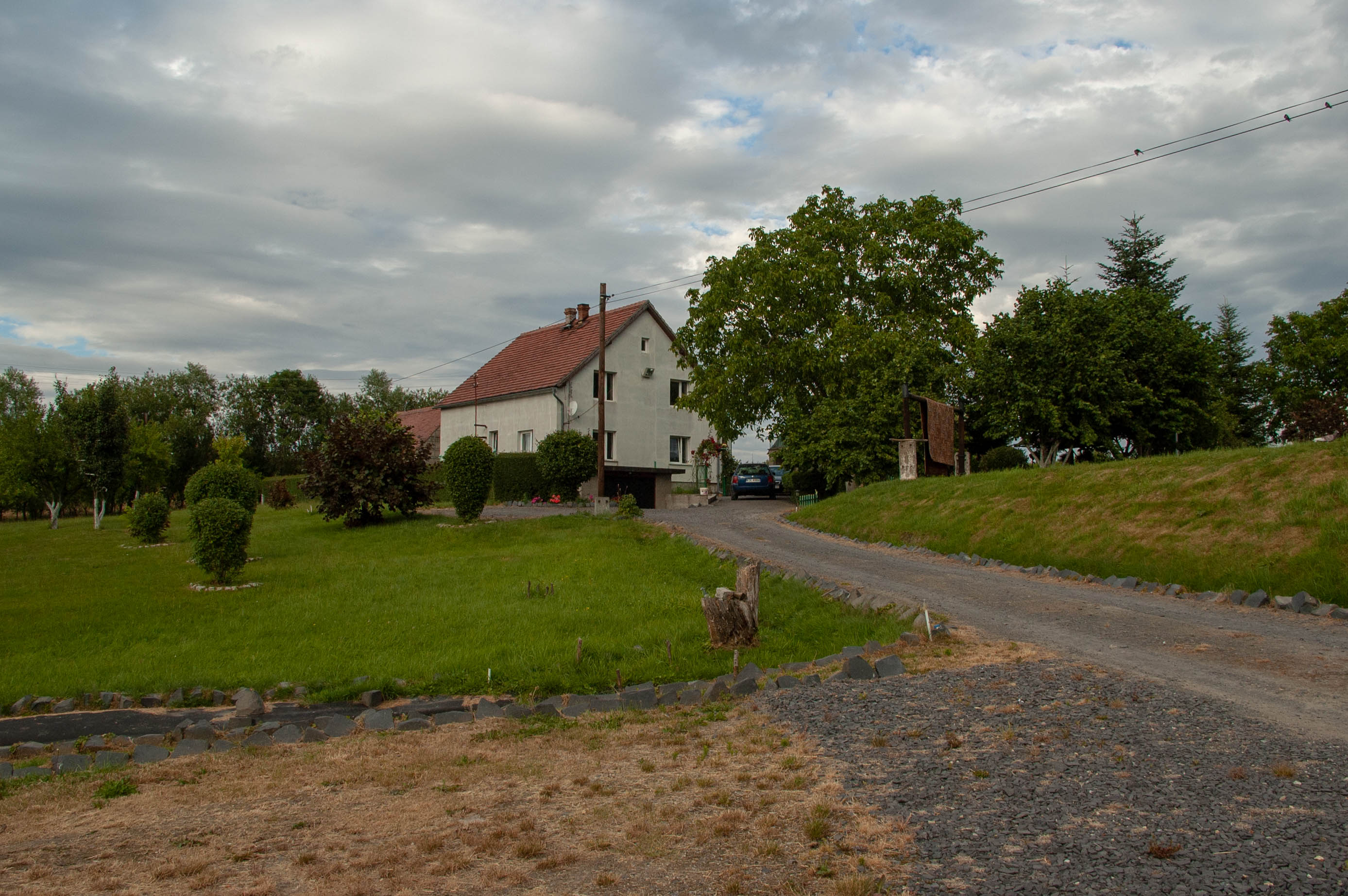
- A house

- Location within Poland
- Coordinates: 51°01′30″N 15°04′53″E
- Country: Poland
- Voivodeship: Lower Silesian
- County: Zgorzelec
- Gmina: Sulików

Stary Zawidów ([ˈstarɨ zaˈviduf]; German: Alt Seidenberg) is a village in the administrative district of Gmina Sulików, within Zgorzelec County, Lower Silesian Voivodeship, in south-western Poland, close to the Czech border.

== Gallery ==
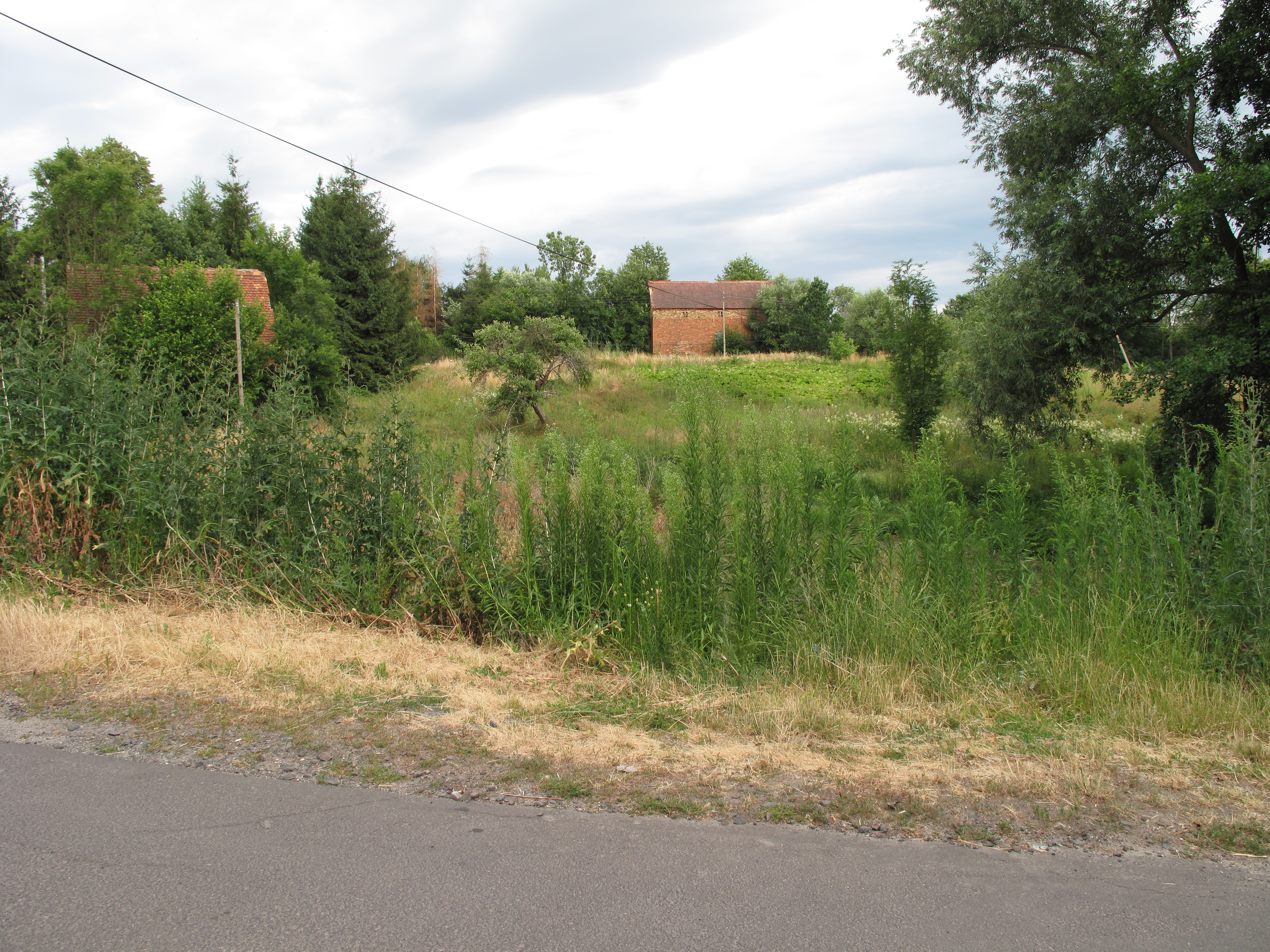
Houses in the nature

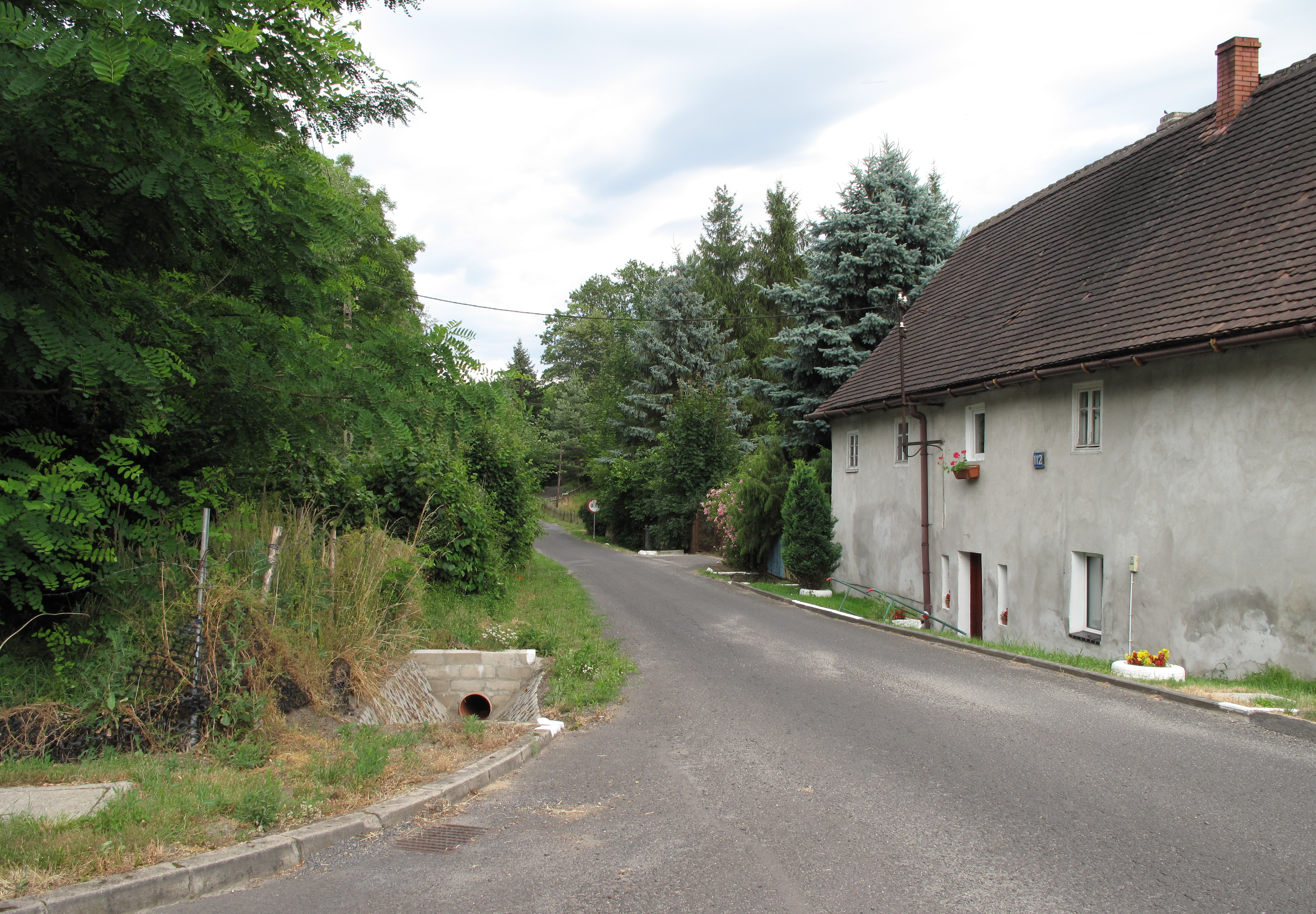
House by the road

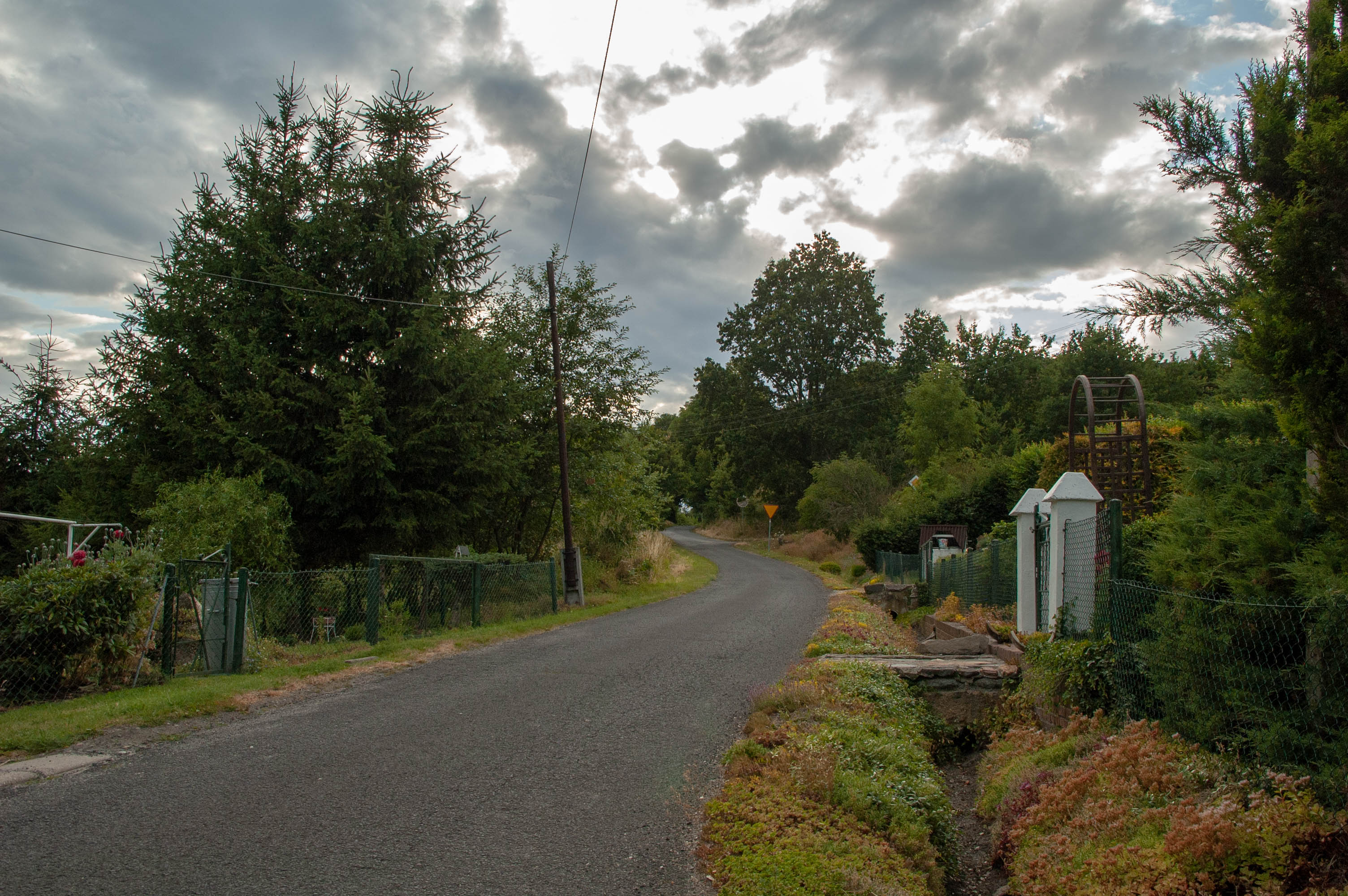
Road

== Notable residents ==
- Jakob Böhme (1575–1624), German Christian mystic and theologian
