= Edith Heraud =

English actress

Edith Heraud (died 1899) was an English actress. Stage appearances included the Shakespearian roles Juliet, Ophelia and Lady Macbeth; she was also well known for giving readings of plays.

== Life ==
Heraud was born in London, daughter of the dramatist John Abraham Heraud. Her debut was in 1851 at Richmond, as Juliet in Romeo and Juliet. In the audience were dramatists including Douglas Jerrold and Stirling Coyne, and The Era called it an "extraordinary performance". She was subsequently sought after by theatre managers, and appeared in many cities in England.

She appeared at Sadler's Wells Theatre as Marina in Shakespeare's Pericles, Prince of Tyre; it ran for 70 nights and was revived after an interval. She later appeared at the same theatre as Ophelia in Hamlet. In 1852 she appeared at the Olympic Theatre as Julia in The Hunchback by James Sheridan Knowles. At the Haymarket Theatre she appeared in the original production of her father's drama Wife or No Wife, as the heroine Olympia.

She appeared in 1857 at Sadler's Wells in Medea by Ernest Legouvé, adapted by her father; it was revived in 1859. A reviewer in The Evening Star wrote: "Miss Heraud has evidently a strong poetic sympathy with the part — a vivid conception of what it is she has undertaken to represent; and speaks far more from impulse than from rule."

She appeared several times as Lady Macbeth. In 1854 she appeared at the Royal Grecian Theatre in a version of Salomon Hermann Mosenthal's play Deborah, which ran for 100 nights.

Heraud was also known as a reader of plays. At The Crystal Palace she gave a reading of Antigone; a reviewer in The Daily News wrote that "the effect was immense. Her clear mellow voice reached the ears of the vast audience, as was shown by the bursts of applause that followed her impassioned recitations, and her skill as an actress enabled her to give animation to the scene." She later gave readings of the closet drama Samson Agonistes by John Milton.

She had delicate health, and in later years she withdrew from the stage, occasionally contributing to periodicals. In 1898 she published a volume of memoirs of her father.

Heraud died in 1899.
