= Personification of wisdom =

Motif found in religious and philosophical texts

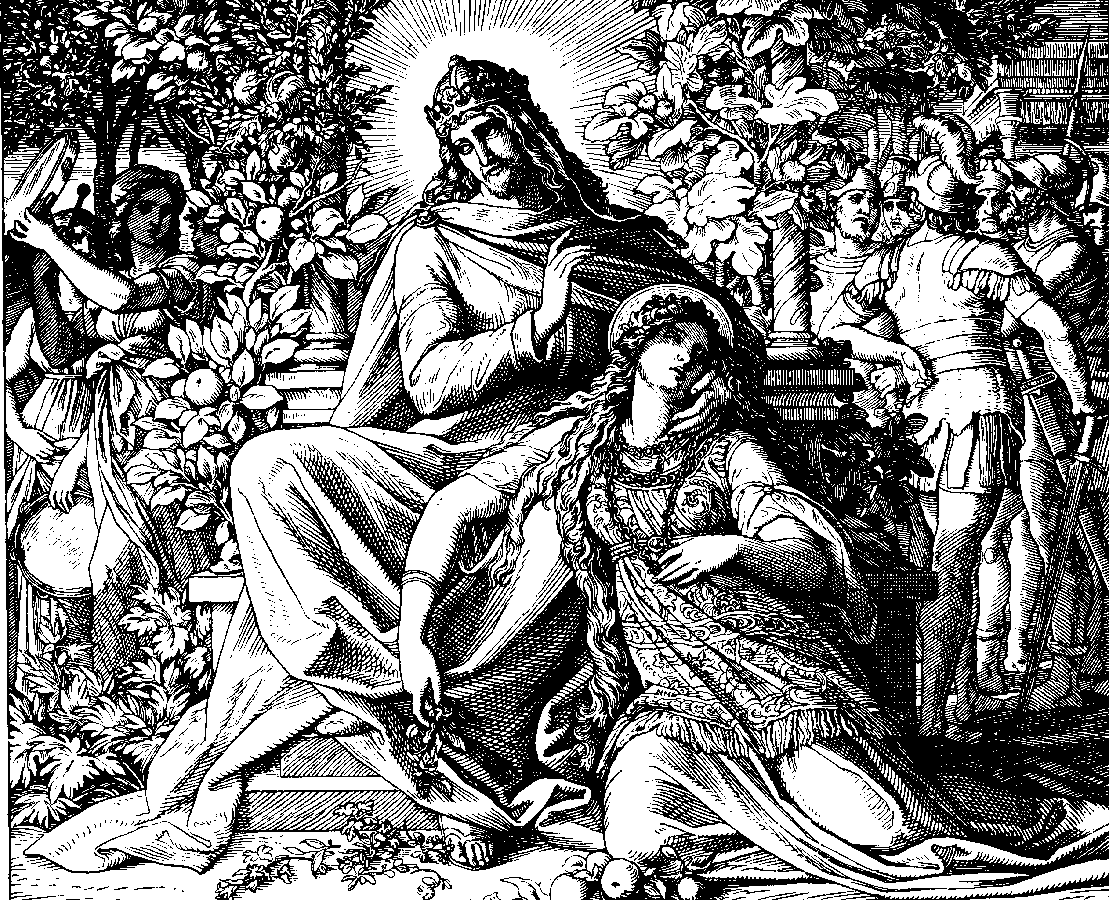
Woodcut for Die Bibel in Bildern, 1860, illustrating Solomon besides a personification of Wisdom

The personification of wisdom, typically as a righteous woman, is a motif found in religious and philosophical texts, most notably in the Book of Proverbs in the Hebrew Bible and other Jewish and Christian texts. Personified visual allegories of wisdom also appear in classical, medieval, and renaissance art.

Sometimes translated as Lady Wisdom, the Greek feminine noun Sophia is itself the translation of 'wisdom' in the Greek Septuagint for Hebrew חכמות Ḥokmot in the Jewish Bible. In some traditions, wisdom is personified as the masculine Logos, referring to 'reason' or the 'word' of God. In Christianity, Logos is identified with Jesus Christ.

== Jewish texts ==
=== Wisdom literature in the Hebrew Bible and Old Testament ===
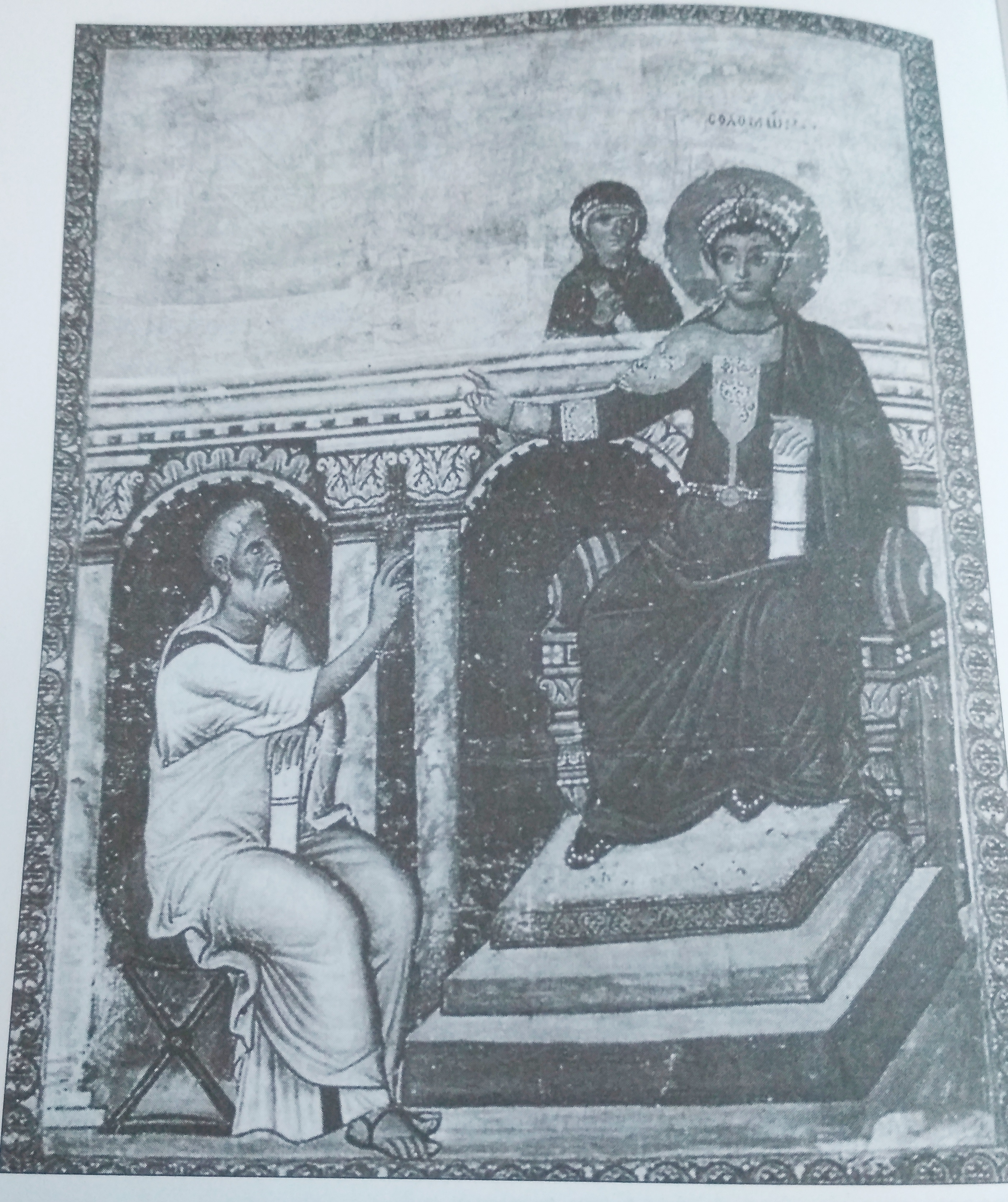
Wisdom personified as a woman depicted behind King Solomon as he speaks with Ben Sira

Wisdom is a central topic in the Sapiential Books or "Books of Wisdom", a term used in biblical studies to refer to the books of Job, Psalms, Proverbs, Ecclesiastes in the Hebrew Bible, and the Book of Wisdom (Wisdom of Solomon), the Song of Songs (Song of Solomon), and Wisdom of Sirach in the Deuterocanonical books of the Christian Old Testament. Wisdom is personified in several of these texts, including Proverbs, the Wisdom of Solomon, and Song of Songs. The Greek Septuagint and the Hebrew Qumran and Masada versions of Ben Sira conclude with a first-person character speaking in Wisdom's voice as in the Book of Proverbs, though it is not certain that this was not appended to Ben Sira from another work. A less clear personification of wisdom is also found in the Cave 11 Psalm Scroll.

These texts are in the broad tradition of wisdom literature that was found widely in the Ancient Near East, and includes writings from many religions. Wisdom literature is a genre of literature common in the ancient Near East. This genre is characterized by sayings of wisdom intended to teach about divinity and about virtue. The key principle of wisdom literature is that while techniques of traditional story-telling are used, books also presume to offer insight and wisdom about nature and reality.

=== Philo and the Logos ===
Philo, a Hellenised Jew writing in Alexandria, attempted to harmonise Platonic philosophy and Jewish scripture. Also influenced by Stoic philosophical concepts, he used the Greek masculine term logos, lit. 'word', for the role and function of wisdom, personfied as an envoy of God.

== Christianity ==
Like Philo, the author of the Gospel of John adopted the Greek term logos as an expression of wisdom, and applied it to Jesus Christ as the eternal Word (Logos) of God the Father. According to Pheme Perkins, in early Gnosticism (1st–2nd century CE) a wisdom tradition developed, in which Jesus' sayings were interpreted as pointers to an esoteric wisdom, in which the soul could be divinized through identification with wisdom. Perkins further said that a mythical story developed in early Gnosticism about the descent of a heavenly creature to reveal the Divine world as the true home of human beings. Jewish Christianity saw the Messiah, or Christ, as "an eternal aspect of God's hidden nature, his 'spirit' and 'truth', who revealed himself throughout sacred history."

== In art ==
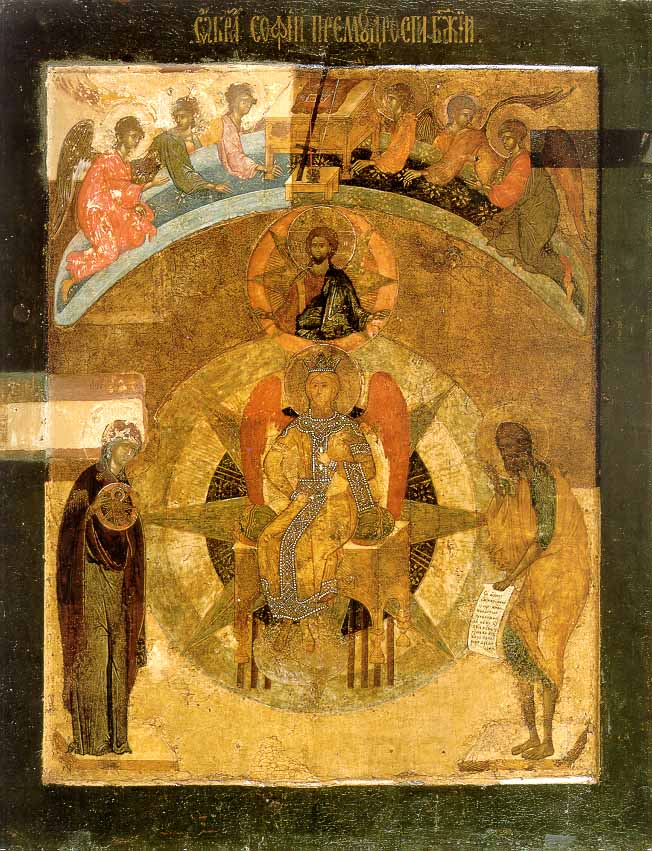
Icon depicting Holy Wisdom as feminine angelic figure with red wings, from the Cathedral of the Annunciation, Moscow (15th century)

=== Classical antiquity ===
In the Roman Empire, it became common to depict the cardinal virtues and other abstract ideals as female allegories. Thus, in the Library of Celsus in Ephesus, built in the 2nd century, there are statues of female allegories depicting wisdom (Sophia), knowledge (Episteme), and virtue (Arete).

=== Medieval ===
In Christian iconography, Holy Wisdom, or Hagia Sophia was depicted as a female allegory from the medieval period. In the Western (Latin) tradition, she appears as a crowned virgin. In Russian Orthodox tradition, she has a more supernatural aspect of a crowned woman with wings in a glowing red colour.

=== Renaissance ===
Allegory of Wisdom and Strength is a painting by Paolo Veronese, created c. 1565 in Venice. It is a large-scale allegorical painting depicting Divine Wisdom personified on the left and Hercules, representing Strength and earthly concerns, on the right.

== See also ==
- Personification in the Bible
- Prajnaparamita
- Seat of Wisdom
- Sophia (Gnosticism)
- Sophiology
- Wisdom King
