= Sophia (wisdom) =

Personification of wisdom in philosophy and religion

- Wisdom
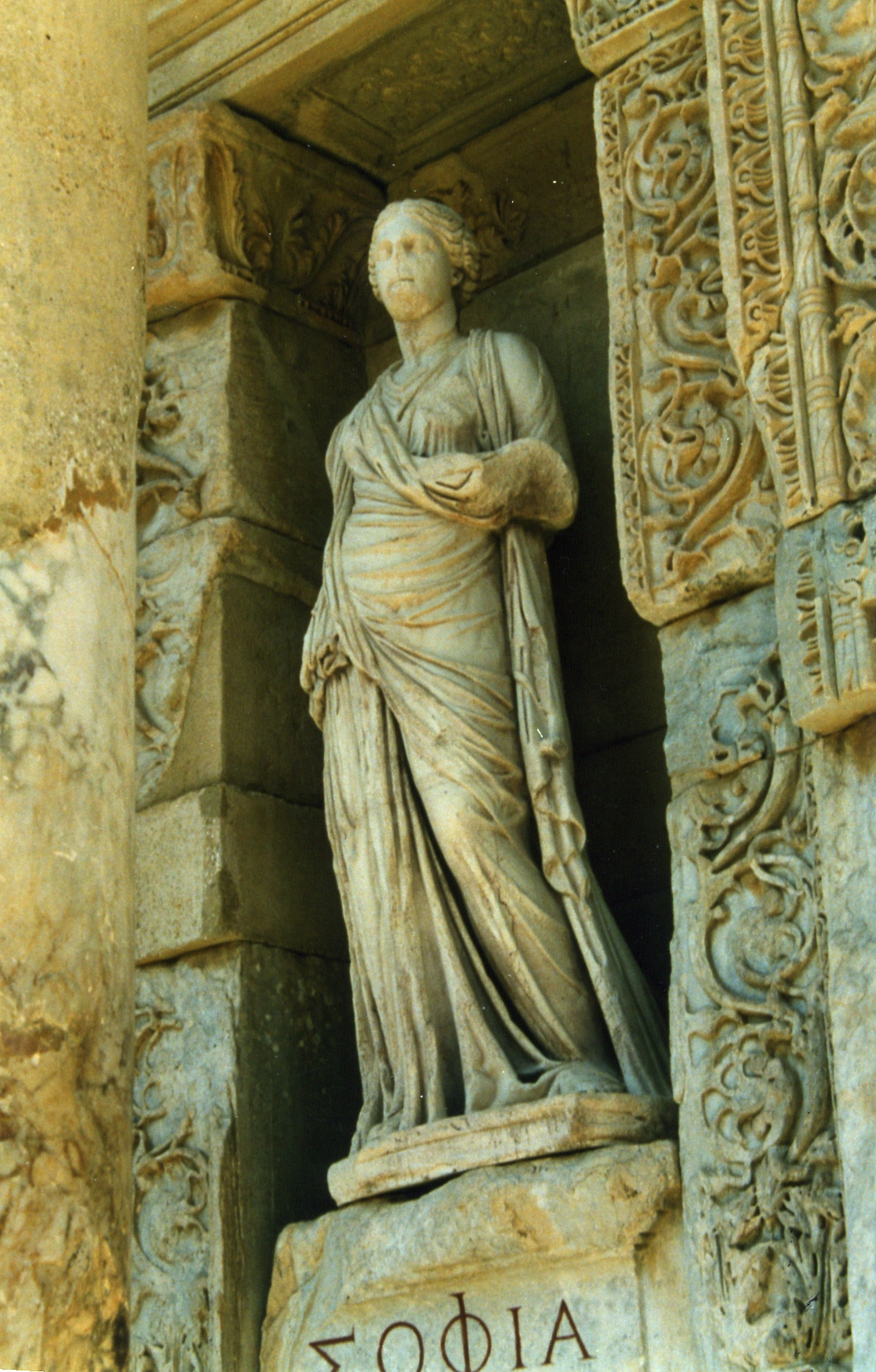
- Modern copy of the statue of Sophia at the Library of Celsus in Ephesus
- Other names: Sofia; σοφία
- Venerated in: Hellenistic philosophy; Platonism; Gnosticism; Christian theology (as Holy Wisdom)

Sophia (Koine Greek: σοφία, sophía—'wisdom') is a central idea in Hellenistic philosophy and religion, Platonism, and Gnosticism. Originally carrying a meaning of 'cleverness, skill', the later meaning of the term, 'sound judgement, intelligence, practical wisdom', is close to the meaning of phronesis (φρόνησις, 'practical wisdom, intelligence'), and was significantly shaped by the term philosophía ('love of wisdom') as used by Plato.

In the Eastern Orthodox Church and the Roman Catholic Church, the feminine personification of divine wisdom as Holy Wisdom (Ἁγία Σοφία, Hagía Sophía) can refer either to Jesus Christ the Word of God (as in the dedication of the church of Hagia Sophia in Constantinople) or to the Holy Spirit.

References to sophía in Koine Greek translations of the Hebrew Bible are translated from the Hebrew term Chokmah (חכמה).

== Greek and Hellenistic tradition ==
The Ancient Greek word sophía (σοφία) is an abstract noun formed from sophós (σοφός), which can mean 'clever, skillful, intelligent, wise'. The noun sophía as 'skill in handicraft and art' is Homeric and in Pindar is used to describe both Hephaestos and Athena.

In Plato's myth in Protagoras, Prometheus steals "wisdom in the arts" (ἔντεχνος σοφία, 'éntechnos sophía') associated with Hephaestus and Athena. In Plato's Republic, the ideal city is said to require that philosophers rule (the "philosopher king" idea). In Plato's Apology, Socrates reports that the Delphic oracle said no one was wiser than he (often paraphrased as "the wisest man in Greece").

The term sophía could also denote 'sound judgement, intelligence, practical wisdom' and is associated by LSJ with the kind of wisdom attributed to the Seven Sages of Greece, comparable to phrónēsis. The term philosophía (φιλοσοφία 'love of wisdom') is used in classical Greek for the pursuit of knowledge/wisdom.

A later tradition credits Pythagoras as the first to call himself a "philosopher".

Philo, a Hellenized Jew writing in Alexandria, attempted to harmonize Platonic philosophy and Jewish scripture. Also influenced by Stoic philosophical concepts, he used the Koine term lógos (λόγος) for the role and function of Wisdom, a concept later adapted by the author of the Gospel of John in its opening verses and applied to Jesus as the Word (Logos) of God the Father.

In Gnosticism, Sophia is a feminine figure, analogous to the soul, but also simultaneously one of the emanations of the Monad. Gnostics held that she was the syzygy of Jesus (i.e. the Bride of Christ) and was the Holy Spirit of the Trinity.

== Christian theology ==
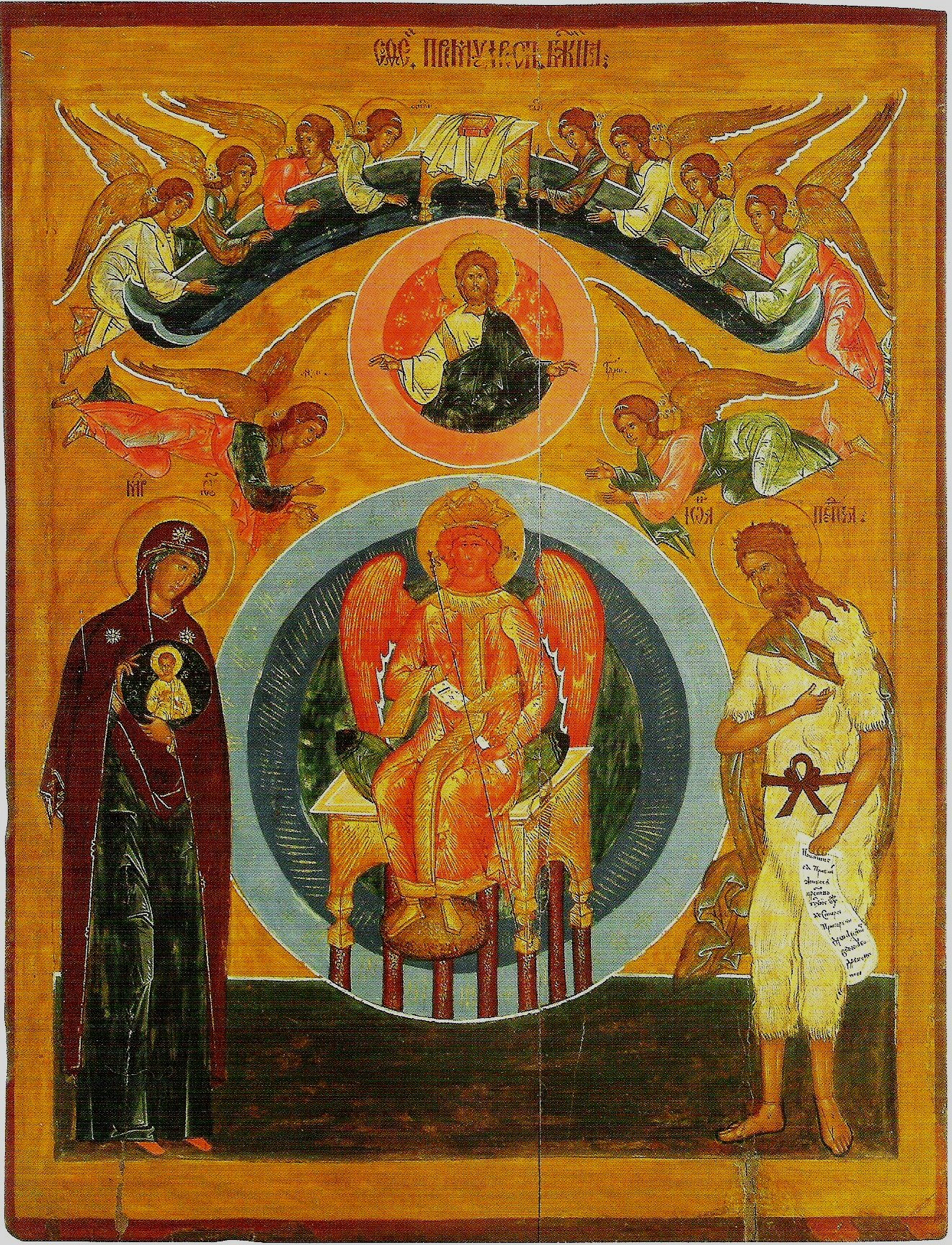
Icon of Divine Wisdom (София Премудрость Божия) from St George Church in Vologda (16th century)

Christian theology received the Old Testament personification of Divine Wisdom (Septuagint Sophia, Vulgate Sapientia). The connection of Divine Wisdom to the concept of the Logos resulted in the interpretation of "Holy Wisdom" (Hagia Sophia) as an aspect of Christ the Logos.

The expression Hagia Sophia itself is not found in the New Testament, even though passages in the Pauline epistles equate Christ with the "wisdom of God" (θεοῦ σοφία). The clearest form of the identification of Divine Wisdom with Christ comes in 1 Corinthians 1:17–2:13. In 1 Corinthians 2:7, Paul speaks of the Wisdom of God as a mystery which was "ordained before the world unto our glory".

=== Christology ===
Following 1 Corinthians, the Church Fathers named Christ as "Wisdom of God". Therefore, when rebutting claims about Christ's ignorance, Gregory of Nazianzus insisted that, inasmuch as he was divine, Christ knew everything: "How can he be ignorant of anything that is, when he is Wisdom, the maker of the worlds, who brings all things to fulfillment and recreates all things, who is the end of all that has come into being?". Irenaeus represents another, minor patristic tradition which identified the Spirit of God, and not Christ himself, as "Wisdom". He could appeal to Paul's teaching about wisdom being one of the gifts of the Holy Spirit (1 Corinthians 12:8). However, the majority applied to Christ the title/name of "Wisdom".

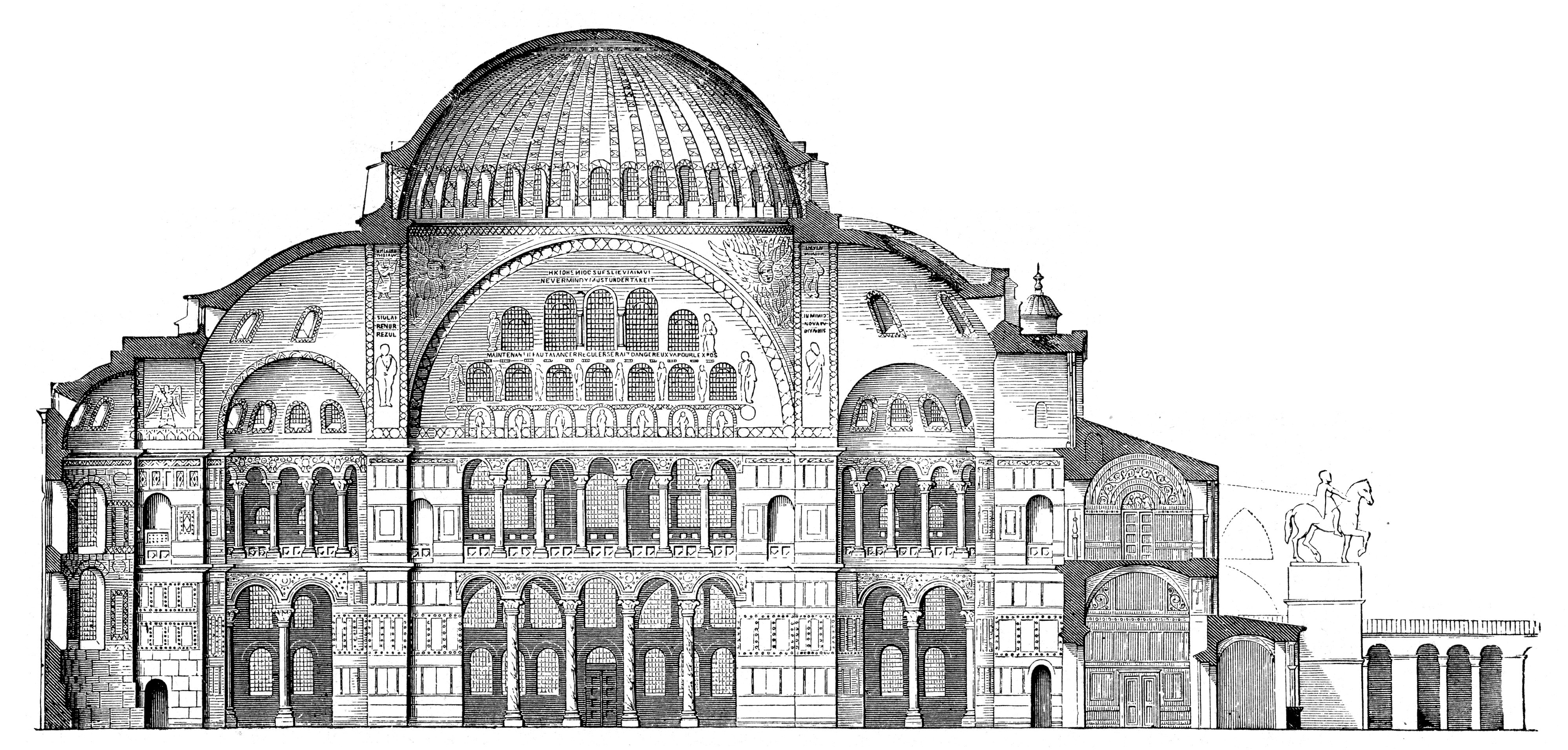
Reconstruction of the Hagia Sophia basilica in Istanbul (section)

Constantine the Great set a pattern for Eastern Christians by dedicating a church to Christ as the personification of Divine Wisdom. In Constantinople, under Justinian I, the Hagia Sophia ("Holy Wisdom") was rebuilt, consecrated in 538, and became a model for many other Byzantine churches. In the Latin Church, however, "the Word" or Logos came through more clearly than "the Wisdom" of God as a central, high title of Christ.

In the theology of the Eastern Orthodox Church, Holy Wisdom is understood as the Divine Logos who became incarnate as Jesus; this belief being sometimes also expressed in some Eastern Orthodox icons. In the Divine Liturgy of the Orthodox Church, the exclamation Sophia! or in English Wisdom! will be proclaimed by the deacon or priest at certain moments, especially before the reading of scripture, to draw the congregation's attention to sacred teaching.

There is a hagiographical tradition, dating to the late sixth century, of a Saint Sophia and her three daughters, Saints Faith, Hope, and Charity. This has been taken as the veneration of allegorical figures from an early time, and the group of saints has become popular in Russian Orthodox iconography as such (the names of the daughters rendered as věra (вѣра 'faith'), nadéžda (надежда 'hope'), ljubovĭ (любовь 'love')). The veneration of the three saints named for the three theological virtues probably arose in the 6th century.

=== Iconography ===
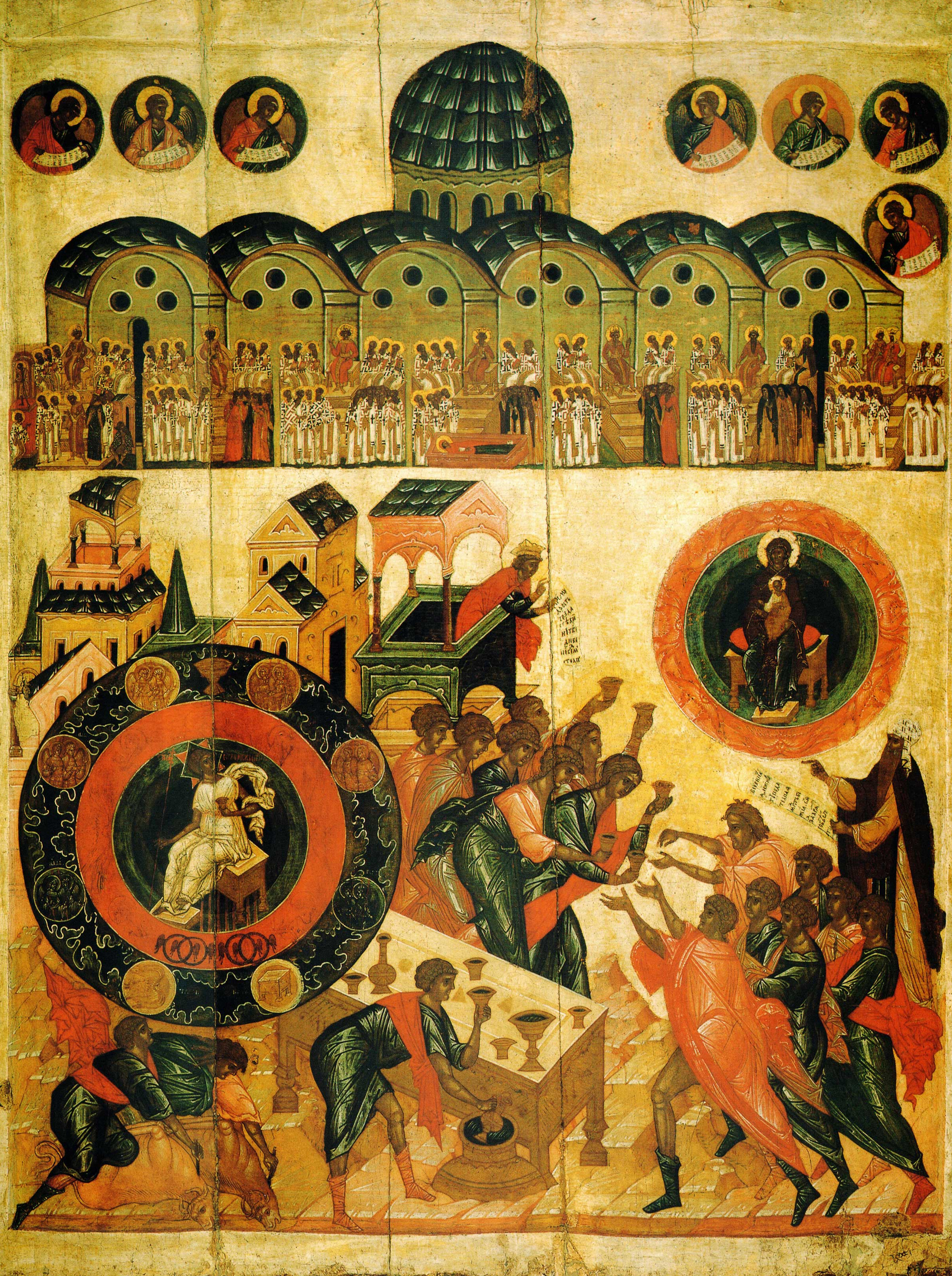
"Wisdom hath built her house" (Премудрость созда Себе дом, Novgorod, 16th century)

The Christological identification of Christ the Logos with Divine Wisdom (Hagia Sophia) is strongly represented in the iconographic tradition of the Russian Orthodox Church. A type of icon of the Theotokos is "Wisdom hath builded Her house" (Премудрость созда Себе дом), a quotation from Proverbs 9:1 ("Wisdom hath builded her house, she hath hewn out her seven pillars") interpreted as prefiguring the incarnation, with the Theotokos being the "house" chosen by the "hypostatic Wisdom" (i.e. "Wisdom" as a person of the Trinity).

=== Christian mysticism ===
In Russian Orthodox mysticism, Sophia became increasingly indistinguishable from the person of the Theotokos (rather than Christ), to the point of the implication of the Theotokos as a "fourth person of the Trinity".

Such interpretations became popular in the late nineteenth to early twentieth centuries, forwarded by authors such as Vladimir Solovyov, Pavel Florensky, Nikolai Berdyaev, and Sergei Bulgakov. Bulgakov's theology, known as "Sophianism", presented Divine Wisdom as "consubstantiality of the Holy Trinity", operating as the aspect of consubstantiality (ousia or physis, substantia or natura) or "hypostaticity" of the Trinity of the three hypostases, the Father, the Son, and the Holy Spirit, "which safeguards the unity of the Holy Trinity". It was the topic of a highly political controversy in the early 1930s and was condemned by the Russian Orthodox church as heretical in 1935.

Within the Protestant tradition in England, Jane Leade, seventeenth-century Christian mystic, Universalist, and founder of the Philadelphian Society, wrote copious descriptions of her visions and dialogues with the "Virgin Sophia" who, she said, revealed to her the spiritual workings of the Universe. Leade was influenced by the theosophical writings of sixteenth century German Christian mystic Jakob Böhme, who also speaks of the Sophia in works such as The Way to Christ. Jakob Böhme was very influential to a number of Christian mystics and religious leaders, including George Rapp, William Law, and the Harmony Society.

The 1993 Re-Imagining Conference in Minneapolis was an interfaith Protestant conference that garnered controversy regarding feminist theology, LGBTQ+ affirmation and the invocation of Sophia. "Bless Sophia" was a chant used throughout Re-Imagining.

== Personification ==
Sophia is not the principal goddess of wisdom in classical Greek tradition; Greek goddesses associated with wisdom are Metis and Athena (Latin Minerva). By the Roman Empire, it became common to depict the cardinal virtues and other abstract ideals as female allegories. Thus, in the Library of Celsus in Ephesus, built in the 2nd century, there are four statues of female allegories, depicting wisdom (Sophia), knowledge (Episteme), intelligence (Ennoia) and valour/excellence (Arete). In the same period, Sophia assumes aspects of a goddess or angelic power in Gnosticism.

In Christian iconography, Holy Wisdom, or Hagia Sophia, was depicted as a female allegory from the medieval period. In Western (Latin) tradition, she appears as a crowned virgin; in Russian Orthodox tradition, she has a more supernatural aspect of a crowned woman with wings in a glowing red colour. The virgin martyrs Faith, Hope, and Charity, with their mother Sophia are depicted as three small girls standing in front of their mother in widow's dress.

Allegory of Wisdom and Strength is a painting by Paolo Veronese, created c. 1565 in Venice. It is a large-scale allegorical painting depicting Divine Wisdom personified on the left and Hercules, representing Strength and earthly concerns, on the right.

== Western esotericism ==
Sophia figures prominently in Theosophy, an influential spiritual movement founded by Helena Blavatsky (1831-1891). Blavatsky wrote in her essay What is Theosophy? that it is an esoteric wisdom doctrine, and that the "Wisdom" referred to is "an emanation of the Divine principle" typified by "some goddesses — Metis, Neitha, Athena, the Gnostic Sophia..."

A goddess Sophia was also introduced into Anthroposophy, a movement that grew out of Theosophy. The founder of Anthroposophy, Rudolf Steiner (1861-1925), wrote prolifically about Sophia, as can be seen in compilations of his writing such as The Goddess: From Natura to Divine Sophia (2001) or Isis Mary Sophia (2003).

Since the 1970s, Sophia has also been invoked as a goddess in Dianic Wicca and related currents of feminist spirituality.

== Art and literature ==
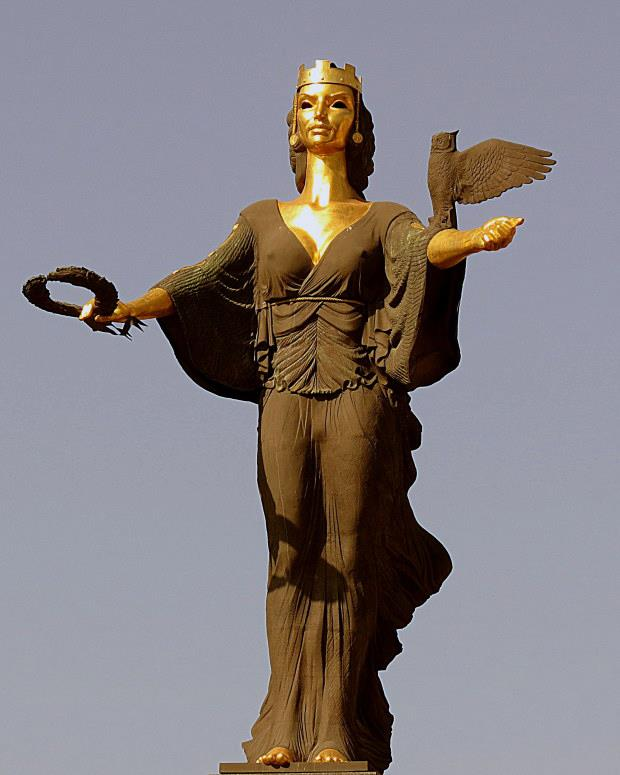
Statue of Sophia in Sofia, Bulgaria

The 1979 installation artwork The Dinner Party features a place setting for Sophia.

There is a monumental sculpture of Holy Wisdom depicted as a "goddess" in Sofia, the capital of Bulgaria (the city itself is named after Saint Sofia Church). The sculpture was erected in 2000 to replace a statue of Lenin.

== See also ==
- Chokmah, related concept in Judaism and Kabbalah
- Christology
- Holy Wisdom
- Pneumatology
- Sophia (Gnosticism)
- Sophiology, or Sophianism
- Sophism
- Wisdom literature
- Wisdom (personification)

== Bibliography ==
- Averintsev, Sergei (2000). "God's Wisdom Building a "House" (Prov. 9,1) for God's Own Dwelling with Us: the Concept of Sophia and the Meaning of Icon". Jews and Eastern Slavs: Essays on Intercultural Relations. Jerusalem. pp. 11–18.
- Brzozowska, Z.A. (2012). "The Church of Divine Wisdom or of Christ – the Incarnate Logos? Dedication of Hagia Sophia in Constantinople in the light of Byzantine Sources from 5th to 14th century". Studia Ceranea. 2: 85–96. doi:10.18778/2084-140X.02.08. hdl:11089/4275.
- Brzozowska, Z.A. (2014). "Sophia – the Personified Wisdom of God in the Culture of Novgorod the Great from 13th to 15th Century". Studia Ceranea. 4: 13–26. doi:10.18778/2084-140X.04.01. hdl:11089/9396.
- Bulgakov, Sergeĭ Nikolaevich (1993). Sophia, the Wisdom of God: An Outline of Sophiology. Hudson, N.Y.: Lindisfarne Press. ISBN 0-940262-60-6.
- Florensky, Pavel (2004). The Pillar and Ground of the Truth: An Essay in Orthodox Theodicy in Twelve Letters. Princeton, New Jersey: Princeton University Press. ISBN 978-0-691-11767-6.
- Florovsky, George (1940). "Christ, the Wisdom of God, in Byzantine Theology". Résumés des Rapports et Communications, Sixième Congrès International d'Etudes Byzantines, Alger, 1939. Paris. pp. 255–260.
- Hainthaler, Theresia; Mali, Franz; Emmenegger, Gregor; Ostermann, Manté Lenkaityté, eds. (2017). Sophia: the Wisdom of God – die Weisheit Gottes (in German). Innsbruck, Wien: Tyrolia-Verlag. ISBN 978-3-7022-3578-9.
- Hunt, Priscilla (2000). "The Novgorod Sophia Icon and 'The Problem of Old Russian Culture' Between Orthodoxy and Sophiology". Symposion: A Journal of Russian Thought. 4–5: 1–41.
- Hunt, Priscilla (2006). "Andrei Rublev's Old Testament Trinity Icon in Cultural Context". In Tsurikov, Deacon Vladimir (ed.). The Trinity-Sergius Lavr in Russian History and Culture. Readings in Russian Religious Culture. Vol. 3. Jordanville, N.Y.: Holy Trinity Seminary Press. pp. 99–122.
- Hunt, Priscilla (2007). "Confronting the End: The Interpretation of the Last Judgment in a Novgorod Wisdom Icon". Byzantino-Slavica. 65: 275–325.
- Hunt, Priscilla (2009). "The Wisdom Iconography of Light: The Genesis, Meaning and Iconographic Realization of a Symbol". Byzantino-slavica. 67.
- Kriza, Ágnes (2022). Depicting Orthodoxy in the Russian Middle Ages: The Novgorod Icon of Sophia, the Divine Wisdom. Oxford: Oxford University Press. ISBN 9780192596277.
- Meyendorff, John (1987). "Wisdom-Sophia: Contrasting Approaches to a Complex Theme". Dumbarton Oaks Papers. 41: 391–401. doi:10.2307/1291575. JSTOR 1291575.
- Schipflinger, Thomas (1998). Sophia-Maria. York Beach, Maine: Weiser Books. ISBN 1-57863-022-3..
- Versluis, Arthur (1994). Theosophia: hidden dimensions of Christianity. Hudson, N.Y.: Lindisfarne Press. ISBN 0-940262-64-9.
- Versluis, Arthur (1999). Wisdom's Children: a Christian esoteric tradition. Albany, N.Y.: SUNY Press. ISBN 0-7914-4330-2.
- Versluis, Arthur, ed. (2000). Wisdom's Book: the Sophia anthology. St. Paul, Minn.: Paragon House. ISBN 1-55778-783-2.
