= Personification in the Bible =

Attribution of human form and characteristics to abstract concepts in the Bible

Personification, the attribution of human form and characteristics to abstract concepts such as nations, emotions and natural forces like seasons and the weather, is a literary device found in many ancient texts, including the Hebrew Bible and Christian New Testament. Personification is often part of allegory, parable and metaphor in the Bible.

== Hebrew Bible ==
=== Personification of qualities ===
A famous example of personification is the personification of Wisdom as a woman in the Book of Proverbs, or natural forces in the Book of Job.

An early example of zoomorphism in the Hebrew Bible is when sin is likened to an animal "crouching" or "lurking" (NRSV) at Cain's door.

=== Personification of geographical entities ===
Personification of Jerusalem as Ariel or Zion as anthropomorphism and Gentile cities such as Babylon, and in Ezekiel Tyre as a "cherub in Eden", and two sisters, Oholah and Oholibah, who represent Samaria and Jerusalem.

=== Personification of nature ===
The fable of The Trees and the Bramble is told in Judges 9:8–15. In Isa. 55:12 Isaiah speaks about the restoration of Israel in conjunction with the nature, which is personified: the mountains and the hills before you shall break forth into singing, and all the trees of the field shall clap their hands. Cf. also Isa 44:23, 49:13

== Second Temple period texts ==
Texts of the Second Temple do not always follow the use or non-use of personification found in the Hebrew Bible. For example the personification of sin "lurking" at Cain's door is missing both from the Septuagint and the Book of Jubilees. Against this Philo of Alexandria frequently uses the device.

== New Testament ==
The New Testament includes Jesus' personification of money as Mammon, Paul's personification of sin ruling as a king in his body, and the "old man" and "new man" as personifications of two warring persons in the new creature after baptism.

In Rom 8:19ff, Paul the Apostle depicts the creature as if they groan together and wait together with those who have been redeemed. When Paul said, the creature / creation is waiting for the revelation of the glory of God's children, he indicates the nature itself or the present world shall be transformed and redeemed when the Lord comes.

The New Testament has a much more specific and developed language for the personification of evil than the Hebrew Bible.
