= Hagia Sophia Church, Nesebar =

Hagia Sophia Church църква „Света София“ The Old Bishopric Старата митрополия
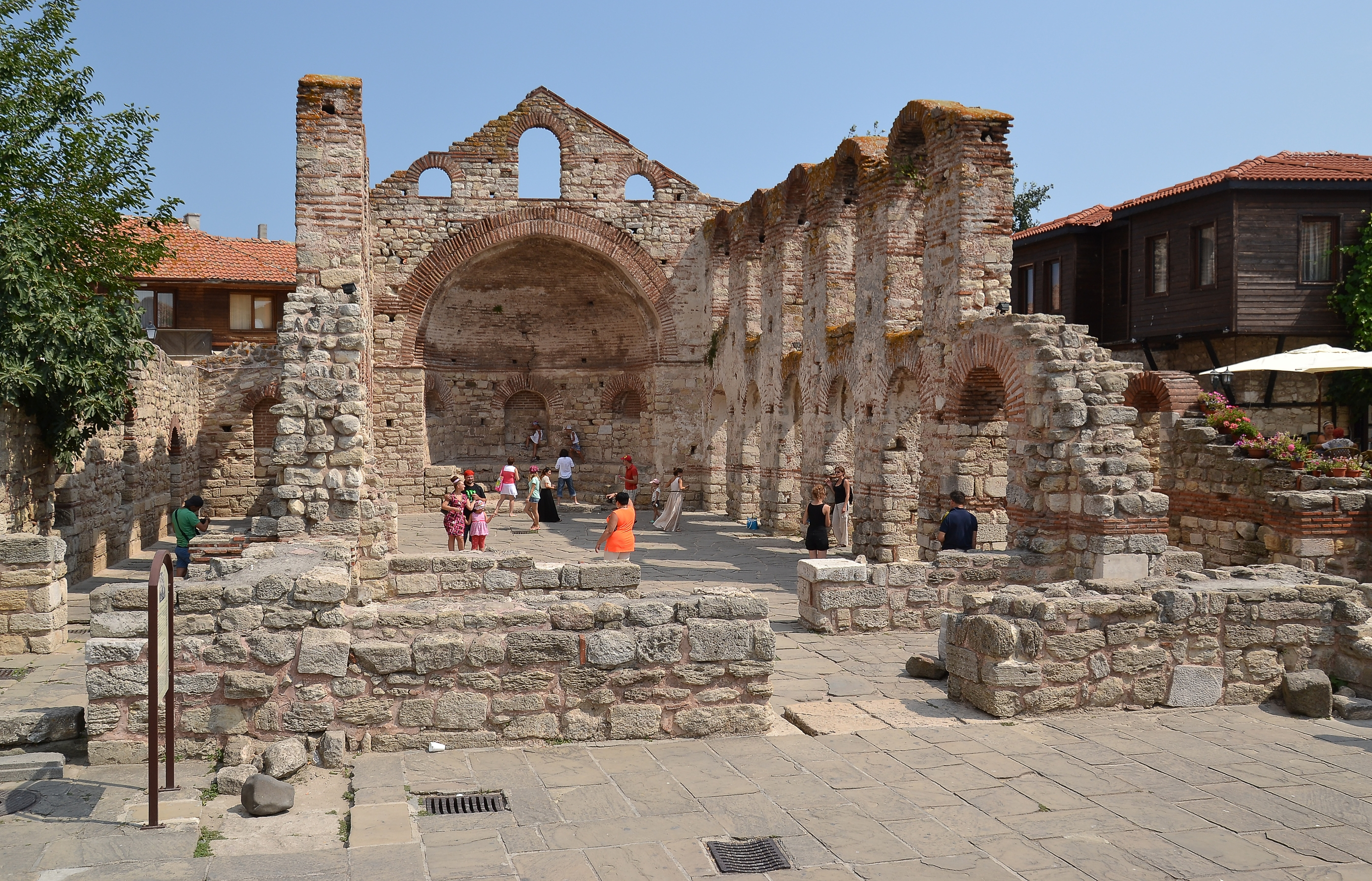
- Hagia Sophia Church, August 2013

Religion
- Affiliation: Eastern Orthodox
- Ecclesiastical or organisational status: Basilica

Location
- Location: Nesebar, Bulgaria
- Interactive map of Hagia Sophia Church църква „Света София“ The Old Bishopric; Старата митрополия
- Coordinates: 42°39′32″N 27°47′10″E

Architecture
- Type: Church
- Completed: 5th–6th century

Specifications
- Length: 25 metres (82 ft)
- Width: 13 metres (43 ft)
- Width (nave): 13 metres (43 ft)

Hagia Sophia Church (Medieval Greek: Ναός Ἁγίας Σοφίας, Naós Hagías Sophías, "Church of Holy Wisdom"), also known as the Church of Saint Sofia (Bulgarian: църква „Света София“, cǎ́rkva "Sveta Sofiya") and the Old Bishopric (Bulgarian: Старата митрополия, Starata mitropoliya) is an Eastern Orthodox church in Nesebar, eastern Bulgaria. It is situated in the old quarter of the town which is part of the UNESCO World Heritage Site list and of the 100 Tourist Sites of Bulgaria.

== History, architectural and artistic features ==
The church is located in what is supposed to have been the center of the ancient city. It is a three-naved unvaulted basilica with a semi-circular apse, a narthex and an atrium. The church has a total length of 25.5 m and a width of 13 m. The division into three naves was effected by two rows of five pillars each. The middle nave (9.3 m wide) ends to the east with a big closed apse, round outside and three-sided inside. There are three arched windows on the eastern wall above the apse. The basilica used to have a double-sloped roof which has not been preserved. From the inside the church used to be plastered and then painted with frescoes. The whole floor used to be covered with mosaics made out with little coloured stones. It has mixed masonry of stone and brick and is the largest of the Nesebar churches whose overground structure has survived.

The basilica was constructed in the late 5th and early 6th century. Its present appearance was dated from the beginning of the 9th century when it was reconstructed. During the Middle Ages it served as a cathedral for the bishopric eparchy centered in Nesebar. In 1257 the church was looted by the Venetians during a campaign against the Bulgarian Empire and many religious relics were taken in the Church of San Salvatore in Venice. The basilica was abandoned in the 18th century.

== Gallery ==
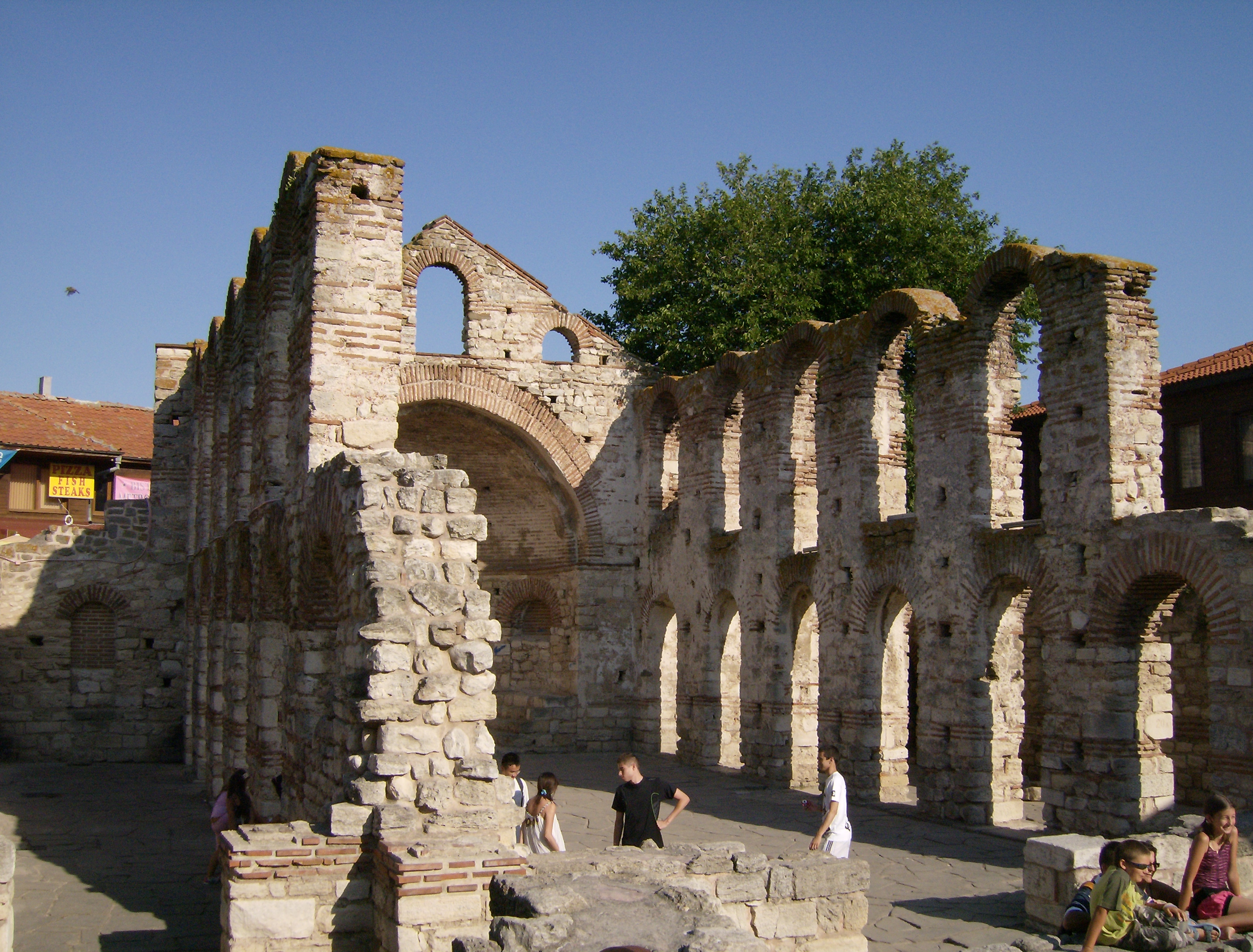

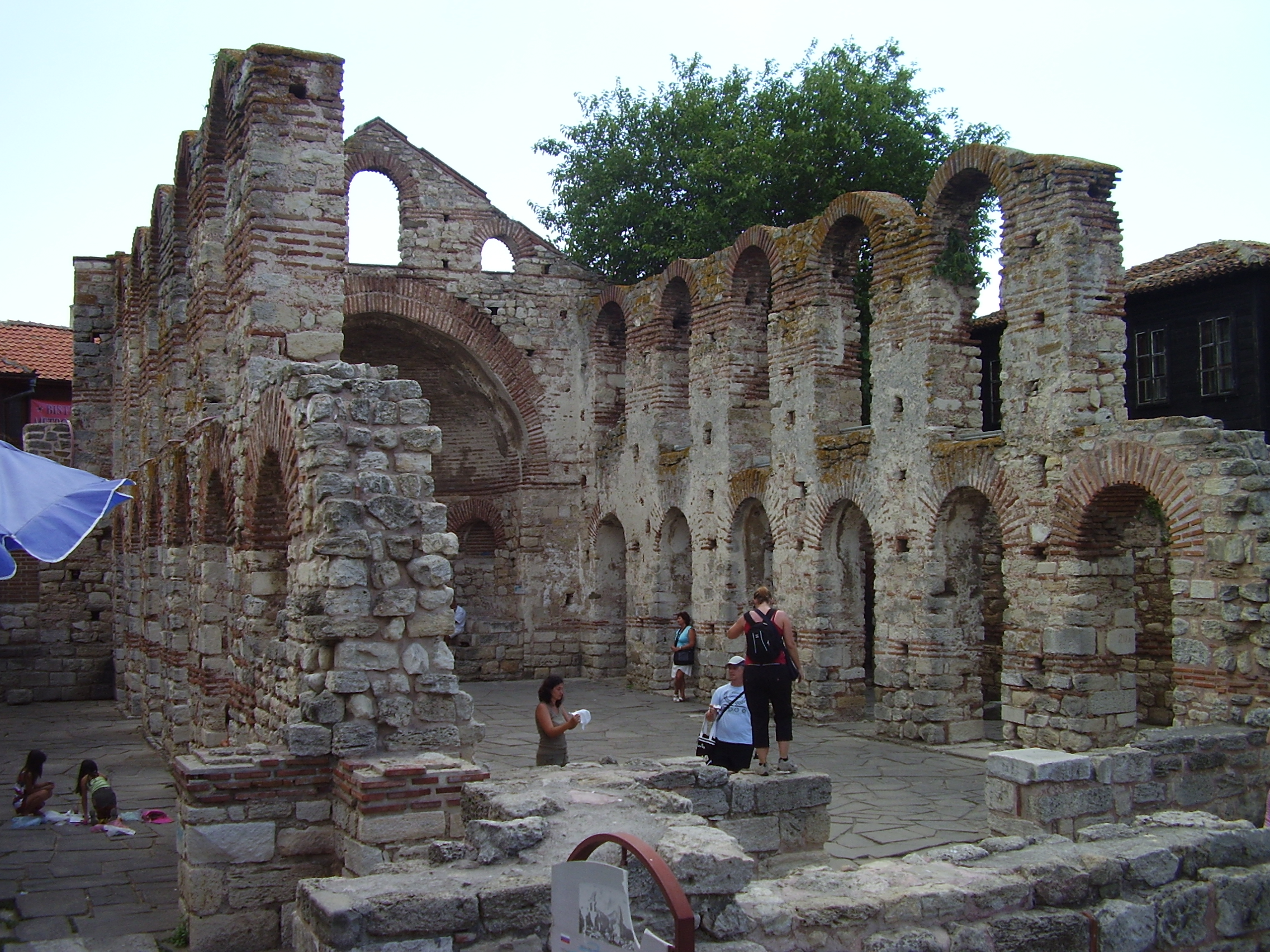

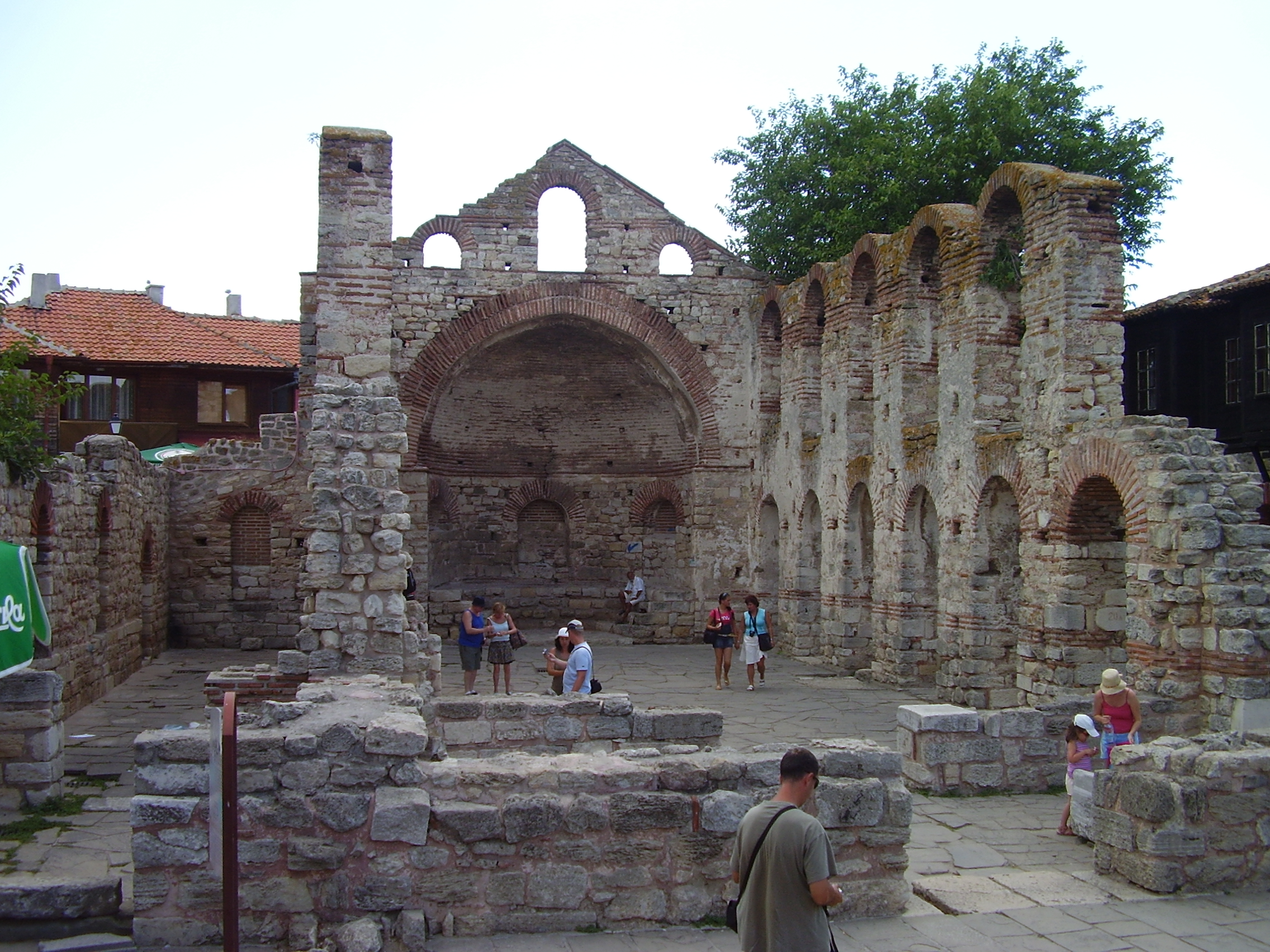

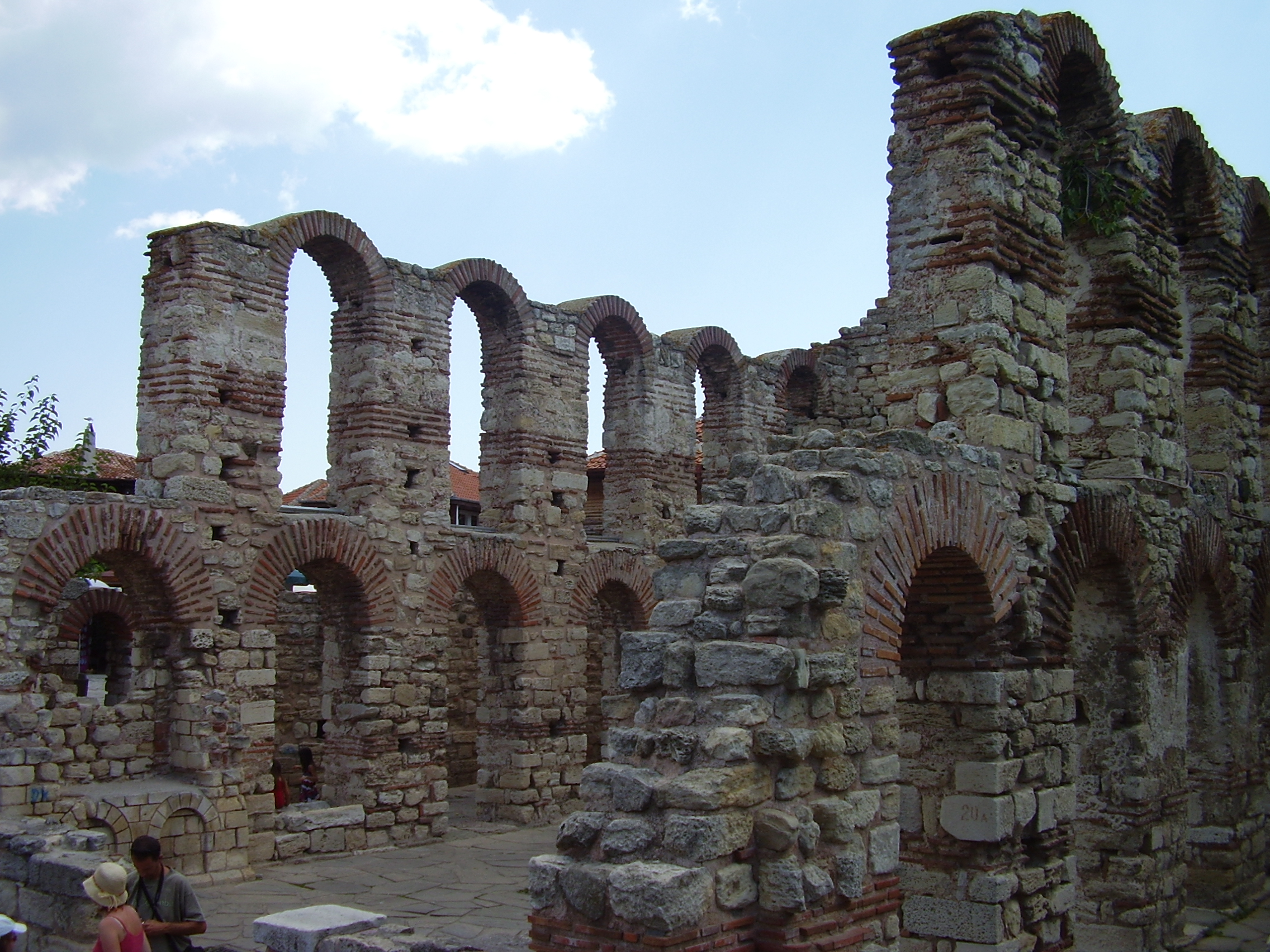

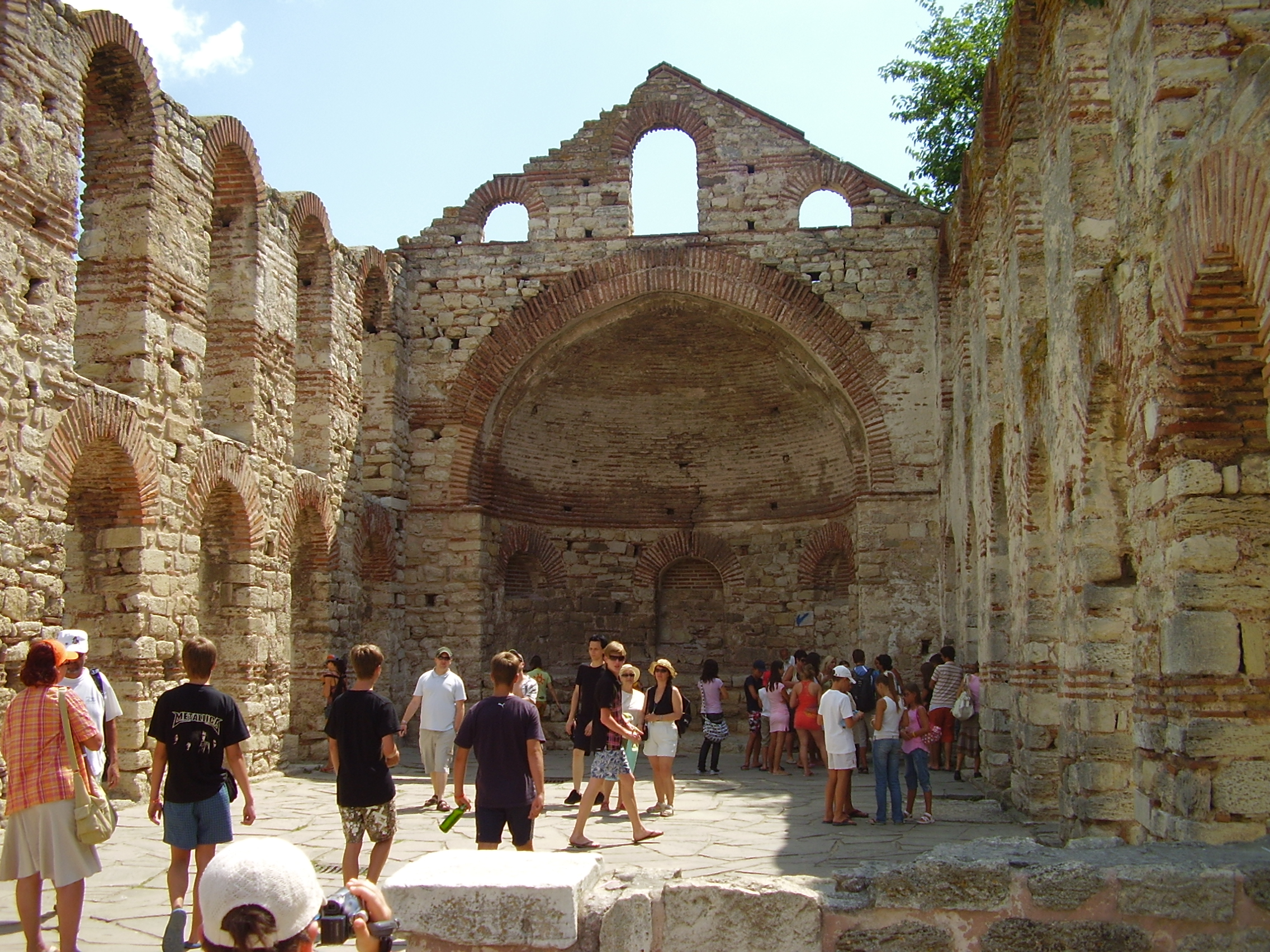

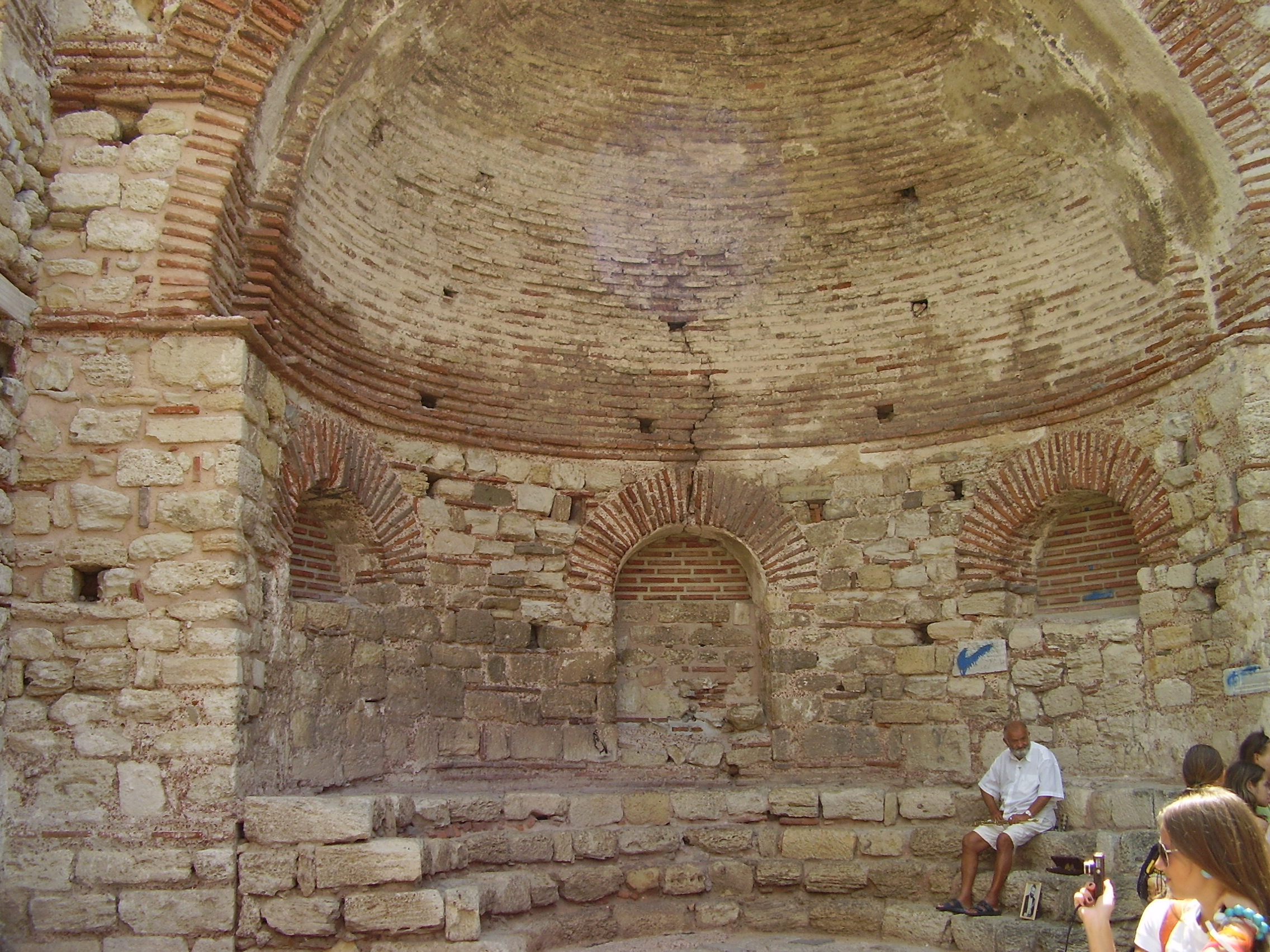

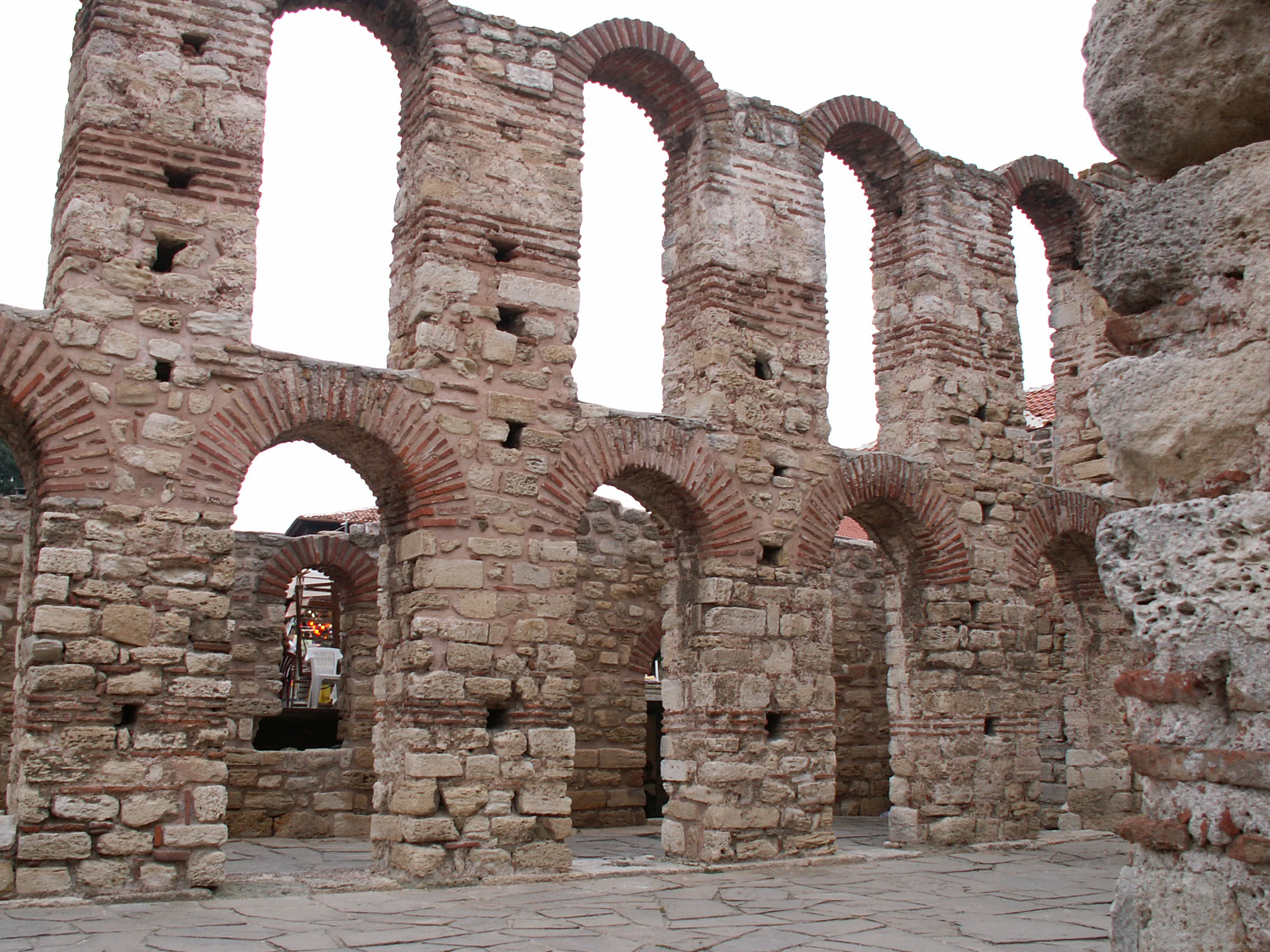
