= Allegory of Virtue and Vice (Veronese) =

Painting by Paolo Veronese

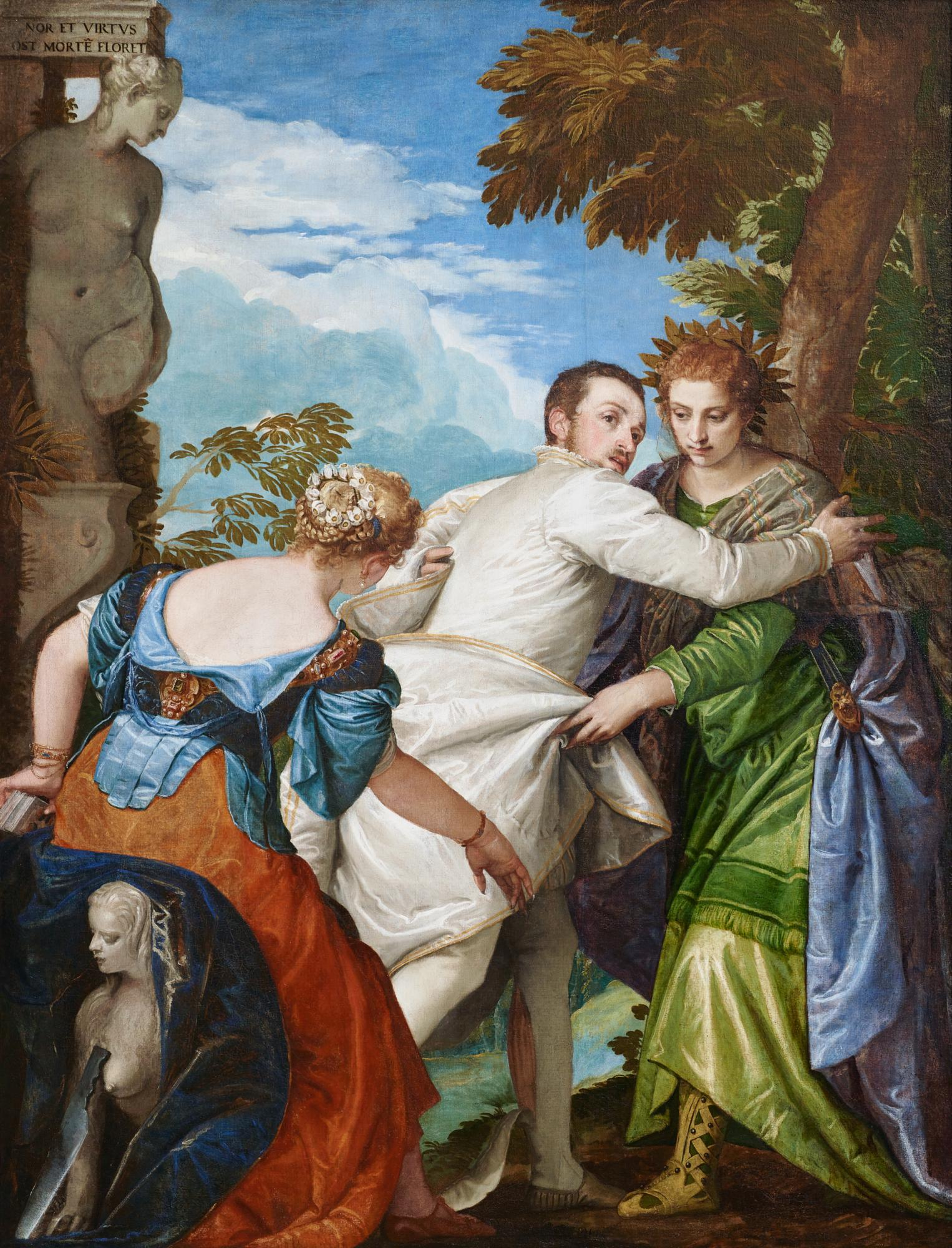
- Artist: Paolo Veronese
- Year: c. 1565
- Medium: Oil on canvas
- Dimensions: 219.1 cm × 169.5 cm (86.3 in × 66.7 in)
- Location: The Frick Collection, New York

Allegory of Virtue and Vice, also known as The Choice Between Virtue and Vice or The Choice of Hercules, is a painting by Paolo Veronese, created c. 1565 in Venice, Italy. It is now located in the Frick Collection, in New York. It is a large-scale allegorical painting depicting Hercules' struggle between virtue and vice, personified here by the figures of the two women physically pulling him in different directions.

== Subject ==
In the painting, Virtue appears to be winning the struggle over Hercules, but Vice has torn Hercules' stocking and still reaches out her hand toward him. Concealed behind her skirt is a dagger and a statue of a sphinx. On the stonework above the scene, an inscription reads "[HO]NOR ET VIRTUS/[P]OST MORTÊ FLORET (Honor and Virtue Flourish after Death)." (Note: The circumflex diacritical mark over E signifies the accusative MORTEM rather than the ablative MORTE.) As an allegory, the job of this painting is to convey a moral message, that of the superiority of virtue over vice.

The genre of allegory contrasts with Veronese's well-known tableaus of historical and biblical scenes, such as the Marriage at Cana, as well as with the less formal works of other Renaissance Venetian painters like Giorgione or Titian. This work, along with "Wisdom and Strength," also in the Frick Collection, is believed to be Veronese's first in this style. These two works are also thought by scholars to be his first to cross the Alps.

== Provenance ==
The Choice Between Virtue and Vice and Wisdom and Strength have traveled together since their creation, through many prestigious owners and collections. Because of this, many scholars assumed that Veronese painted them as a pair. In 1970, Edgar Munhall was the first scholar to suggest that they were simply made at the same time, not as pendants. Work undertaken by scholars at the Metropolitan Museum of Art in the 2000s confirmed that the two were made individually.

From its creation in Venice, this painting traveled through the hands of Emperor Rudolph II of the Holy Roman Empire, Queen Christina of Sweden, the Odescalchi family, the famous Orleans collection of Philippe II, Duke of Orleans, and then through the hands of various Englishmen and art dealers before arriving at its current home in the Frick Collection.
