= Allegory of Wisdom and Strength =

c. 1565 painting by Paolo Veronese

The Allegory of Wisdom and Strength
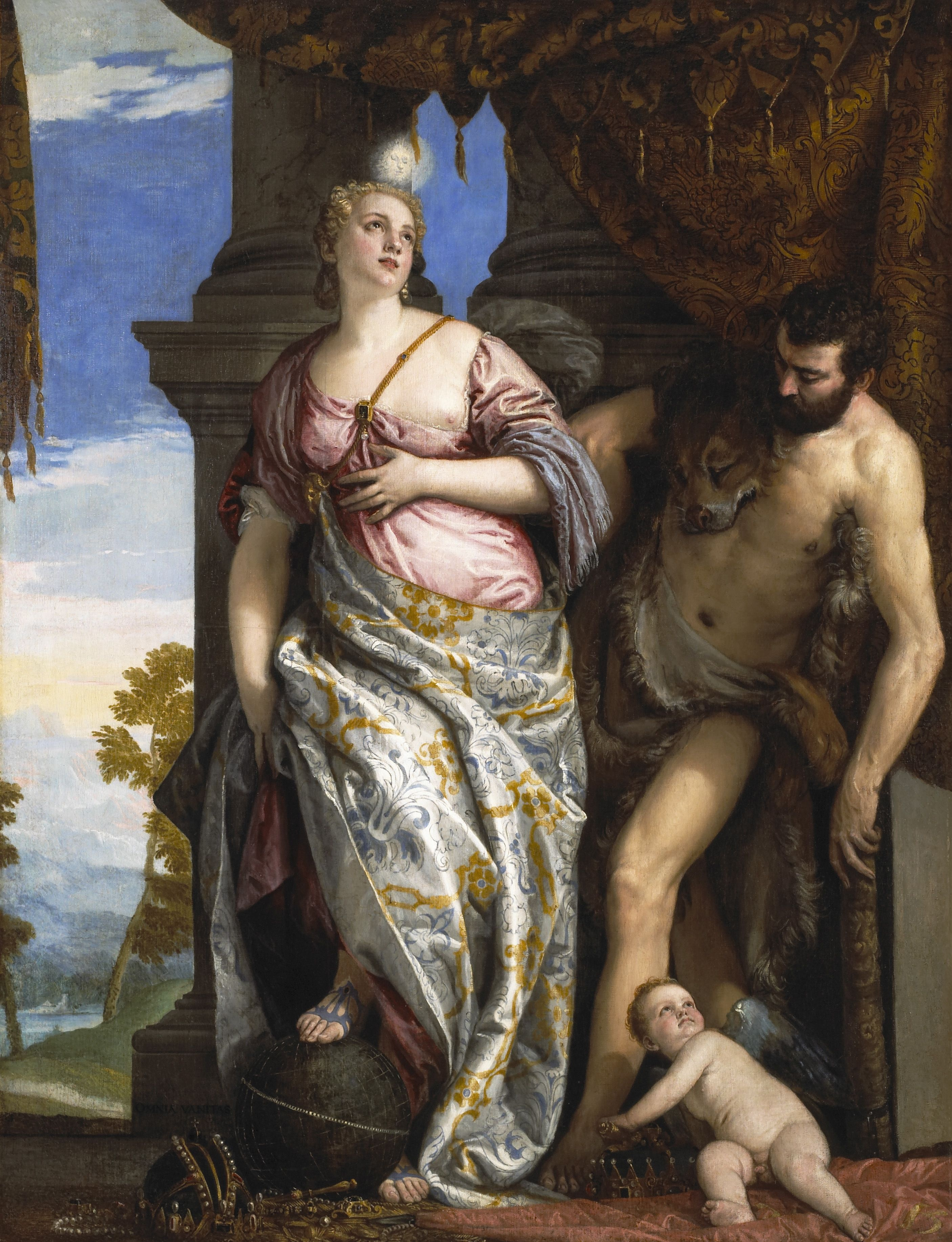
- Artist: Paolo Veronese
- Year: c. 1565
- Medium: Oil on canvas
- Dimensions: 214.6 cm × 167 cm (84.5 in × 66 in)
- Location: The Frick Collection; New York

Allegory of Wisdom and Strength or Wisdom and Strength is a painting by Paolo Veronese, created c. 1565 in Venice. It is now located in the Frick Collection, in New York. It is a large-scale allegorical painting depicting Divine Wisdom personified on the left and Hercules, representing Strength and earthly concerns, on the right. Wisdom gazes heavenward while Hercules looks down on jewels below him. The conflict between divine and mortal affairs is central in this allegorical painting.

== Subject ==
In the painting, the virtuosity of Divine Wisdom appears to triumph over the earthly desires of Hercules. She is bathed in light, and seems to be rising, while Hercules is moving downward, towards deeper shadow.

The genre of allegory contrasts with Veronese's well-known tableaus of historical and biblical scenes, such as the Marriage at Cana as well as with the less formal works of other Renaissance Venetian painters like Giorgione or Titian. This work, along with Allegory of Virtue and Vice also in the Frick Collection, is believed to be Veronese's first in this style. These two works are also thought by scholars to be his first to cross the Alps.

== Provenance ==
The Allegory of Virtue and Vice and Wisdom and Strength have traveled together since their creation, through many prestigious owners and collections. Because of this, many scholars assumed that Veronese painted them as a pair. In 1970, Edgar Munhall was the first scholar to suggest that they were simply made at the same time, not as pendants. Work undertaken by scholars at the Metropolitan Museum of Art in the 2000s confirmed that the two were made individually. The scholars found that the artist used different materials for the supports of each painting, different makeup of the grounds, and differing methods of creating the skies. These qualities led them to conclude that the paintings were created as independent works, not as a set. This conclusion was supported by the visual analysis of the scholars, who felt that the paintings did not visually complement one another in a way that suggested they were painted as a pair.

From its creation in Venice, this painting traveled through the hands of Emperor Rudolph II of the Holy Roman Empire, Queen Christina of Sweden, the Odescalchi family, the famous Orleans Collection of Philippe II, Duke of Orleans, and then through the hands of various Englishmen and art dealers before arriving at its current home in the Frick Collection.
