= Sophiology =

School of thought in Russian Orthodoxy

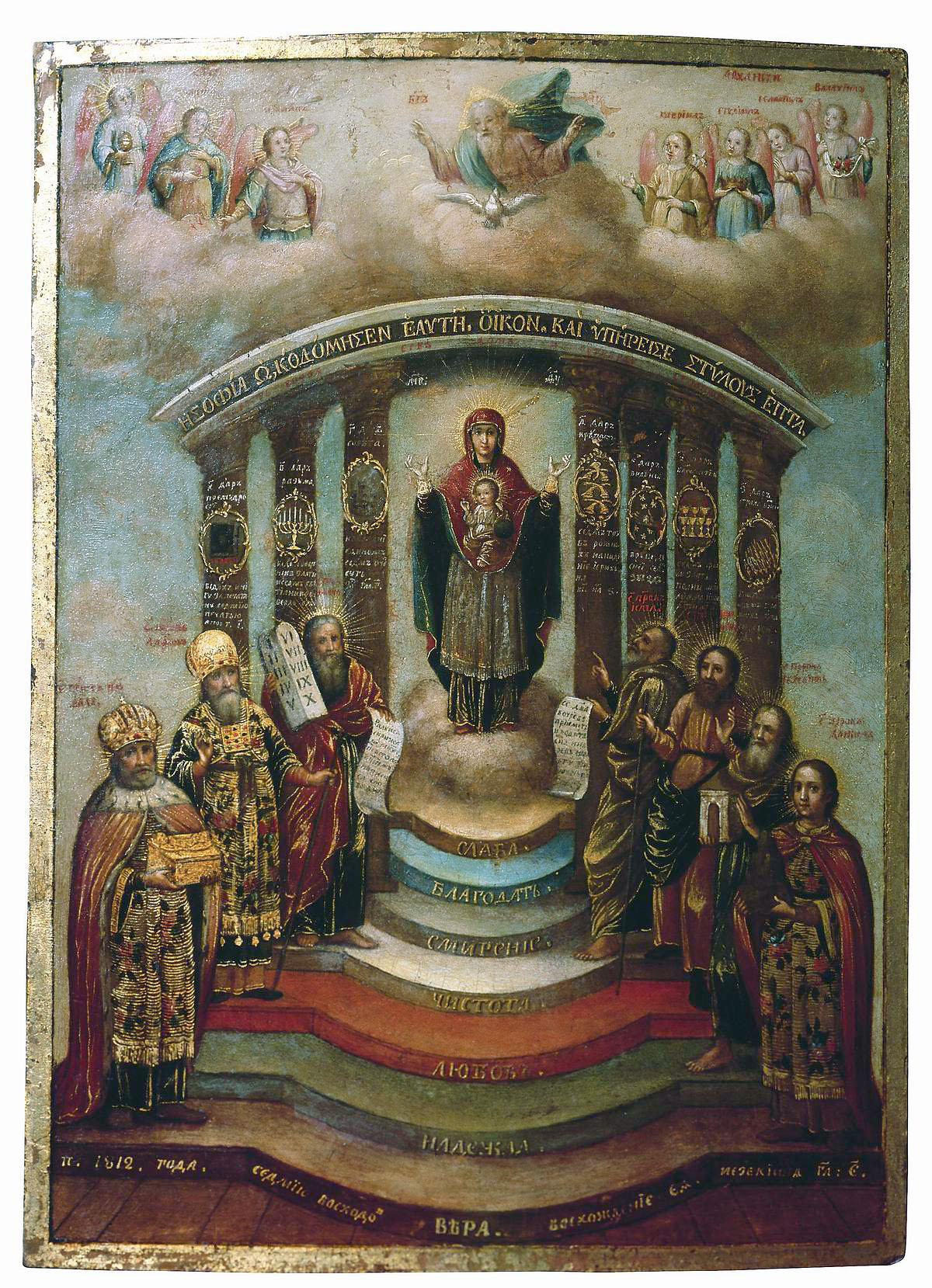
Icon, Theotokos as Sophia, the Holy Wisdom, Kiev (1812)

Sophiology (Russian: Софиология; by detractors also called Sophianism (Софианство) or Sophism (Софизм)) is a controversial school of thought in the Russian Orthodox tradition of Eastern Orthodox Christianity that holds that Divine Wisdom (or Sophia—Greek: σοφία; literally translatable to "wisdom") is to be identified with God's essence, and that this Divine Wisdom is in some way expressed in the world as 'creaturely' wisdom. This notion has often been characterized as introducing a feminine "fourth hypostasis" into the Trinity.

== History ==
=== Antecedents ===
Personified representations of Holy Wisdom (Ἁγία Σοφία) or the "Wisdom of God" refer in Orthodox theology to the person of Jesus Christ, as illustrated in the Acts of the Seventh Ecumenical Council (Nicaea II, 787): "Our Lord Jesus Christ, our true God, the self-existent Wisdom of God the Father, Who manifested Himself in the flesh, and by His great and divine dispensation (lit. economy) freed us from the snares of idolatry, clothing Himself in our nature, restored it through the cooperation of the Spirit, Who shares His mind..." More recently it has been stated that "From the most ancient times and onwards many Orthodox countries have been consecrating churches to the Lord Jesus Christ as the Wisdom of God."

=== Origin ===
Sophiology has its roots in the early modern period, but as an explicit theological doctrine was first formulated during the 1890s to 1910s by Vladimir Solovyov (1853–1900), Pavel Florensky (1882–1937) and Sergei Bulgakov (1871–1944). For Bulgakov, the Theotokos was the world soul and the "pneumatophoric hypostasis", a Bulgakov neologism.

=== Controversy within the Russian Orthodox Church ===
In 1935, parts of Sergei Bulgakov's doctrine of Sophia were condemned by the Patriarchate of Moscow and the Bishops' Council of the Russian Orthodox Church Outside of Russia. Although Bulgakov was censured by these jurisdictions, a committee commissioned by Metropolitan Eulogius (Georgiyevsky) of Paris to critique Bulgakov's Sophiology found his system questionable, but not heretical, and issued no formal censure (save for a minority report written by two members of the committee, Georges Florovsky and Sergei Ivanovich Chetverikov).

Alexis Klimoff summarized Georges Florovsky's principal objections to Sophiology as follows: "Sophiology diverges from traditional (patristic) Orthodox teaching on fundamental questions like creation; [it] falsely claims to be sanctified by historical precedent; [it] represents a retreat from the reality of a historical religion into the abstractions of speculative philosophy; [its] sources are not only non-patristic, but to a significant degree non-Orthodox (Protestant mysticism) and non-Christian (the occult)."

Bulgakov responded to the objections raised against his project; his project was an immanent critique of Protestant mysticism and the occult.

=== Roman Catholic and feminist responses ===
Thomas Merton studied the Russian Sophiologists and praised Sophia in his poem titled "Hagia Sophia" (1963). The Roman Catholic Valentin Tomberg in his magnum opus Meditations on the Tarot incorporated many Sophiological insights into his Christian Hermeticism, pairing the Holy Trinity (Father-Son-Holy Spirit) with the Trino-Sophia (Mother-Daughter-Holy Soul), which together he called “The Luminous Holy Trinity”. The book's 2020 Angelico Press edition includes an introduction written by Robert Spaemann, a favorite theologian of Pope Benedict XVI, while its other editions feature an afterword by Hans Urs von Balthasar.

Johnson (1993) and Meehan (1996) noted parallels between the Russian "sophiological" controversy and the Gender of God debate in western feminist theology.

== See also ==
- Holy Wisdom (iconography)
- Holy Wisdom § Russian mysticism
- Sergei Bulgakov § Controversy
- Vladimir Solovyov (philosopher) § Sophiology
- Essence-energies distinction
- Russian symbolism
- Sophia (wisdom)
- Sophia (Gnosticism)

== Sources ==
- Sergei Bulgakov. Sophia, the Wisdom of God: An Outline of Sophiology. Hudson, NY: Lindisfarne Books, 1993. (ISBN 0940262606, ISBN 978-0-940262-60-7)
- Oleg A. Donskikh, ‘Cultural roots of Russian Sophiology’, Sophia, 34(2), 1995, pp38–57
- Priscilla Hunt, "The Novgorod Sophia Icon and 'The Problem of Old Russian Culture' Between Orthodoxy and Sophiology", Symposion: A Journal of Russian Thought, vol. 4–5, (2000), 1–41.
- Michael Martin. The submerged reality: sophiology and the turn to a poetic metaphysics. Kettering, OH: Angelico Press, 2015. ISBN 978-1-6213-8113-6
- Brenda Meehan, ‘Wisdom/Sophia, Russian identity, and Western feminist theology’, Cross Currents, 46(2), 1996, pp149–168
- Marcus Plested. Wisdom in Christian tradition: the patristic roots of modern Russian sophiology. Oxford: Oxford University Press, 2022.
- Thomas Schipflinger, Sophia-Maria (in German: 1988; English translation: York Beach, ME: Samuel Wiser, 1998) ISBN 1-57863-022-3
- Mikhail Sergeev, Sophiology in Russian Orthodoxy: Solov’ev, Bulgakov, Losskii, Berdiaev (Lewiston, New York: Edwin Mellen Press, 2007) ISBN 0-7734-5609-0 and ISBN 978-0-7734-5609-9, 248 pages
