= Holy Wisdom =

Concept in Christian theology

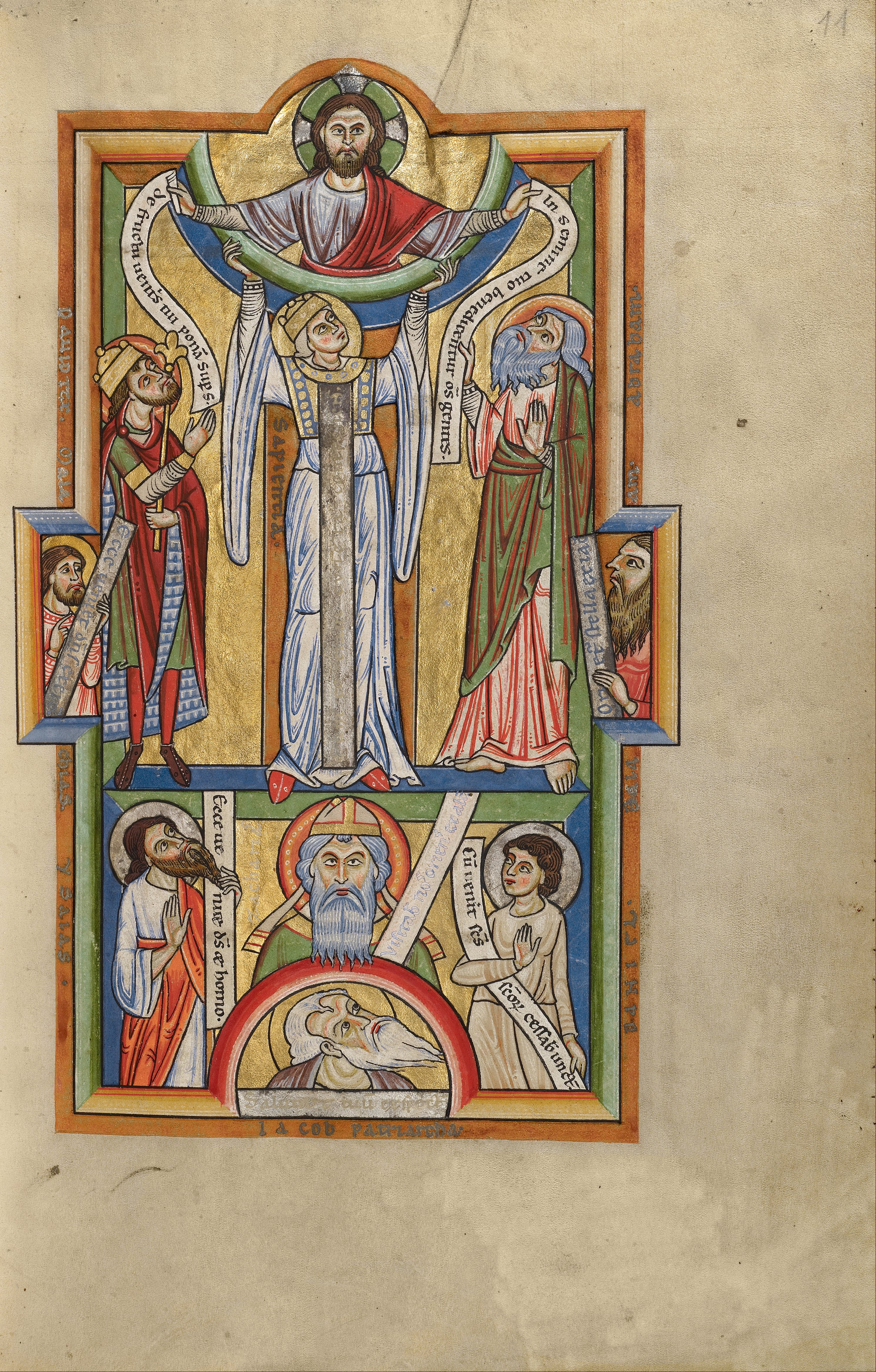
Full-page illustration of Sapientia (Wisdom) from the 12th-century Stammheim Missal. Wisdom is the central figure, between the figures of Christ (above), Zechariah, father of John the Baptist and the patriarch Jacob (below), David and Abraham, Malachi and Balaam, Isaiah, and Daniel (to the left and right, respectively)

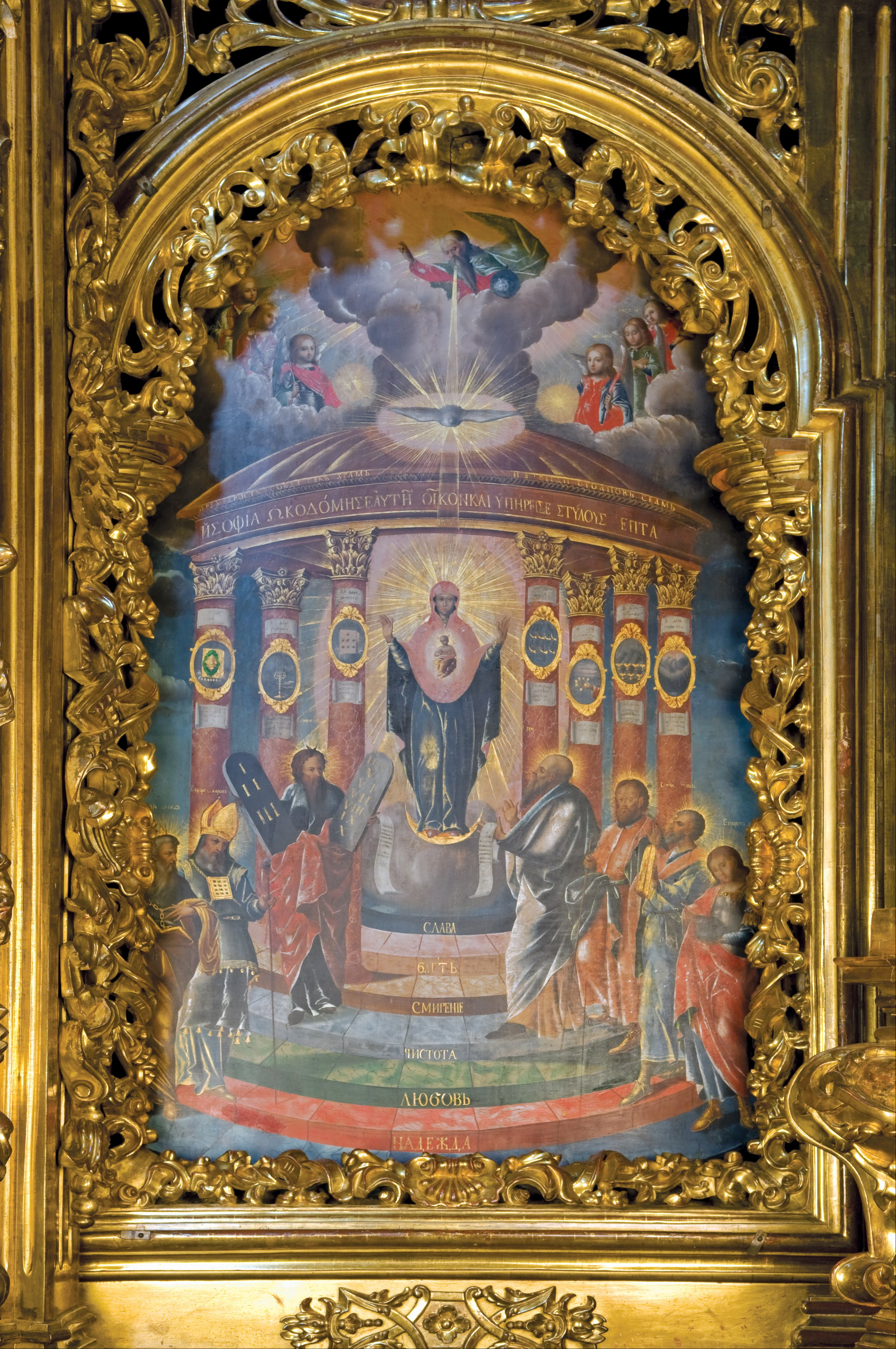
Wisdom(Sophia) in her house supported by seven pillars

Holy Wisdom (Ancient Greek: Ἁγία Σοφία, romanized: Hagia Sophia; Latin: Sancta Sapientia) is a concept in Christian theology.

Christian theology received the Old Testament personification of Wisdom (Hebrew Chokmah) as well as the concept of Wisdom (Sophia) from Greek philosophy, especially Platonism. In Christology, Christ the Logos as God the Son was identified with Divine Wisdom from earliest times.

There has also been a minority position which identified Wisdom with the Holy Spirit instead. Furthermore, in mystical interpretations forwarded in Russian Orthodoxy, known as Sophiology, Holy Wisdom as a feminine principle came to be identified with the Theotokos (Mother of God) rather than with Christ himself. Similar interpretations were proposed in feminist theology as part of the "God and Gender" debate in the 1990s.

== Old Testament ==
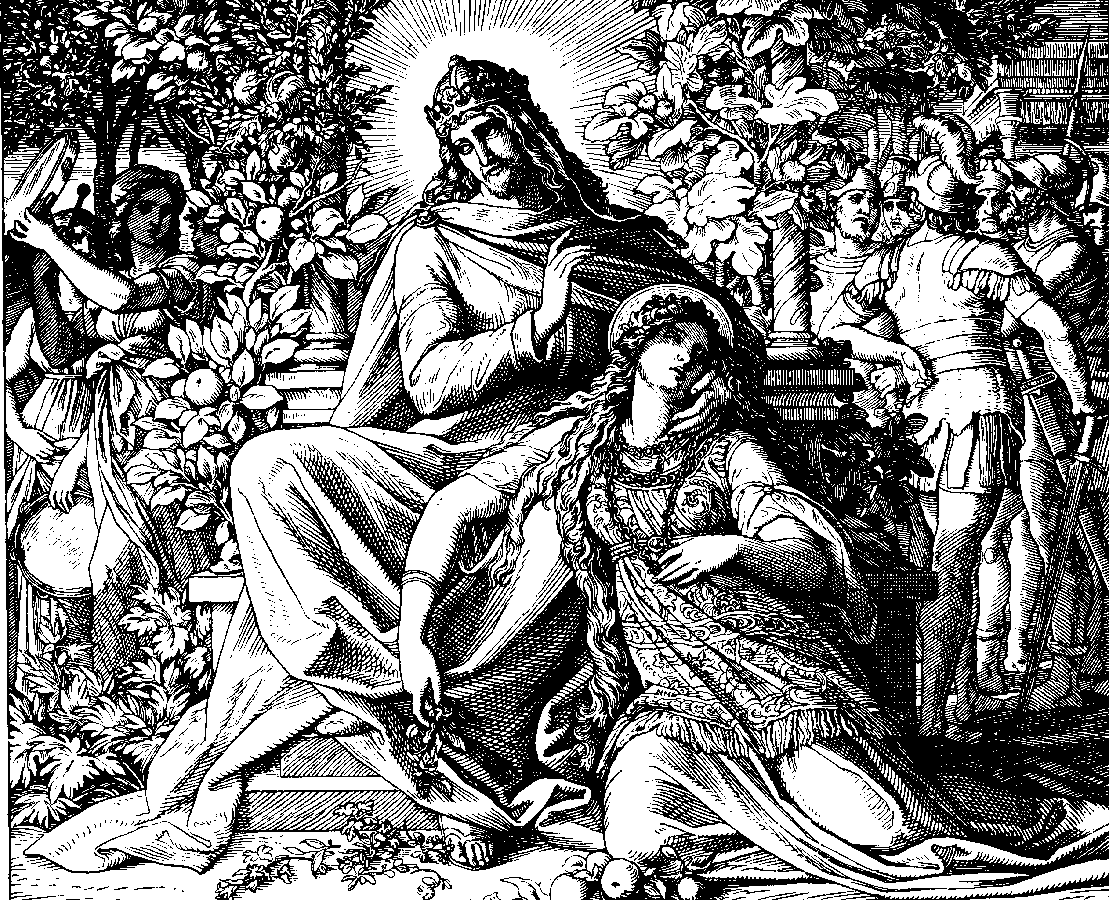
Solomon and Lady Wisdom by Julius Schnorr von Karolsfeld, 1860

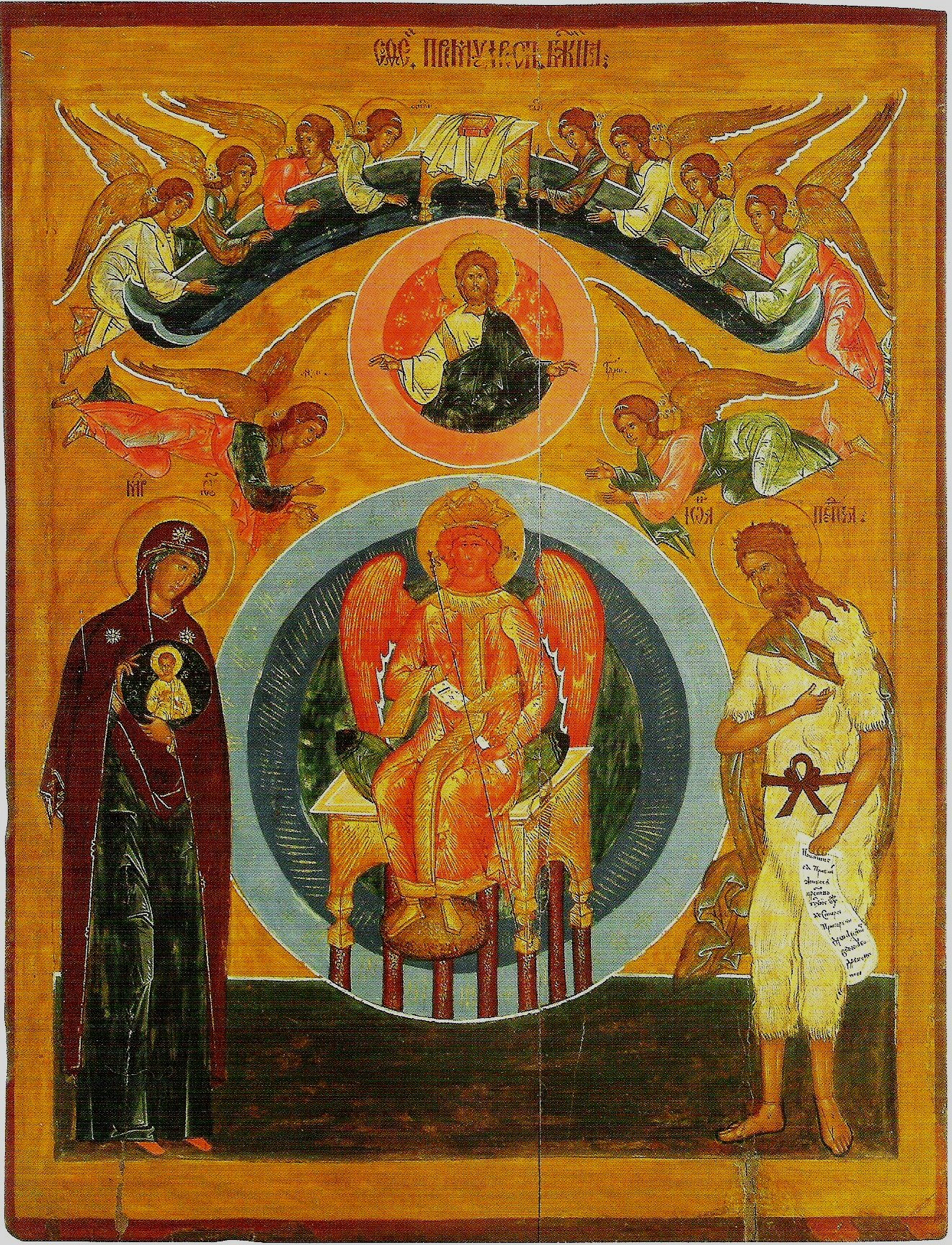
Wisdom (Sophia) on her throne supported by seven pillars - Icon of Divine Wisdom София Премудрость Божия) from St George Church in Vologda (16th century)

In the Septuagint, the Greek noun sophia is the translation of Hebrew חָכְמָה ḥoḵma "wisdom". Wisdom is a central topic in the "sapiential" books, i.e. Proverbs, Psalms, Song of Songs, Ecclesiastes, Book of Wisdom, Wisdom of Sirach, and to some extent Baruch (the last three are Deuterocanonical books of the Old Testament).

== New Testament ==
The expression Ἁγία Σοφία itself is not found in the New Testament, even though passages in the Pauline epistles equate Christ with the "wisdom of God" (θεοῦ σοφία).

Wisdom (Sophia) is mentioned in the gospels of Luke and Matthew a number of times in reference to Jesus. His wisdom is recognized by the people of Nazareth, his hometown, when he was teaching in the synagogue, "insomuch that they were astonished, and said, Whence hath this man this wisdom, and these mighty works?" (Matthew 13:54, cf. Mark 6:2) Acts names wisdom as a quality given to the apostles, alongside the Holy Spirit (Acts 6:3, 6:10). St. Paul refers to wisdom, notably in 1 Corinthians, "Where is the wise? where is the scribe? where is the disputer of this world? hath not God made foolish the wisdom of this world?" (1 Corinthians 1:20), setting worldly wisdom against a higher wisdom of God: "But we speak the wisdom of God in a mystery, even the hidden wisdom, which God ordained before the world unto our glory." (1 Corinthians 2:7) The Epistle of James (James 3:13–18; cf. James 1:5) distinguishes between two kinds of wisdom. One is a false wisdom, which is characterized as "earthly, sensual, devilish" and is associated with strife and contention. The other is the 'wisdom that comes from above': "But the wisdom that is from above is first pure, then peaceable, gentle, easy to be intreated, full of mercy and good fruits, without partiality, and without hypocrisy." (James 3:17) Revelation 5:12 lists wisdom as a property of the Lamb: "Worthy is the Lamb that was slain to receive power, and riches, and wisdom, and strength, and honour, and glory, and blessing."

== In Christology ==
The identification of Christ with God's Wisdom is ancient, and was explicitly stated by the early Church Fathers, including Justin Martyr and Origen. The clearest form of the identification of Divine Wisdom with Christ comes in 1 Corinthians 1:17–2:13. There is a minor position among the Church Fathers which held that Wisdom is identical not to Christ but to the Holy Spirit. This was advanced by Theophilus of Antioch (d. 180) and by Irenaeus of Lyons (d. 202/3).

Emperor Constantine set a pattern for Eastern Christians by dedicating a church to Christ as the personification of Divine Wisdom. In Constantinople, under Emperor Justinian, Hagia Sophia ("Holy Wisdom") was rebuilt, consecrated in 538, and became a model for many other Byzantine churches. In the Latin Church, however, "the Word" or Logos came through more clearly than "the Wisdom" of God as a central, high title of Christ.

In the theology of the Western Latin Church, note Hugh of Saint Victor's allusion to Jesus as Wisdom in Book One of his Didascalicon. In the Eastern Orthodox Church, Holy Wisdom is understood as the Divine Logos who became incarnate as Jesus Christ; this belief being sometimes also expressed in some Eastern Orthodox icons. In the Divine Liturgy of the Eastern Orthodox Church, the exclamation Sophia! or in English Wisdom! will be proclaimed by the deacon or priest at certain moments, especially before the reading of scripture, to draw the congregation's attention to sacred teaching.

== Churches ==
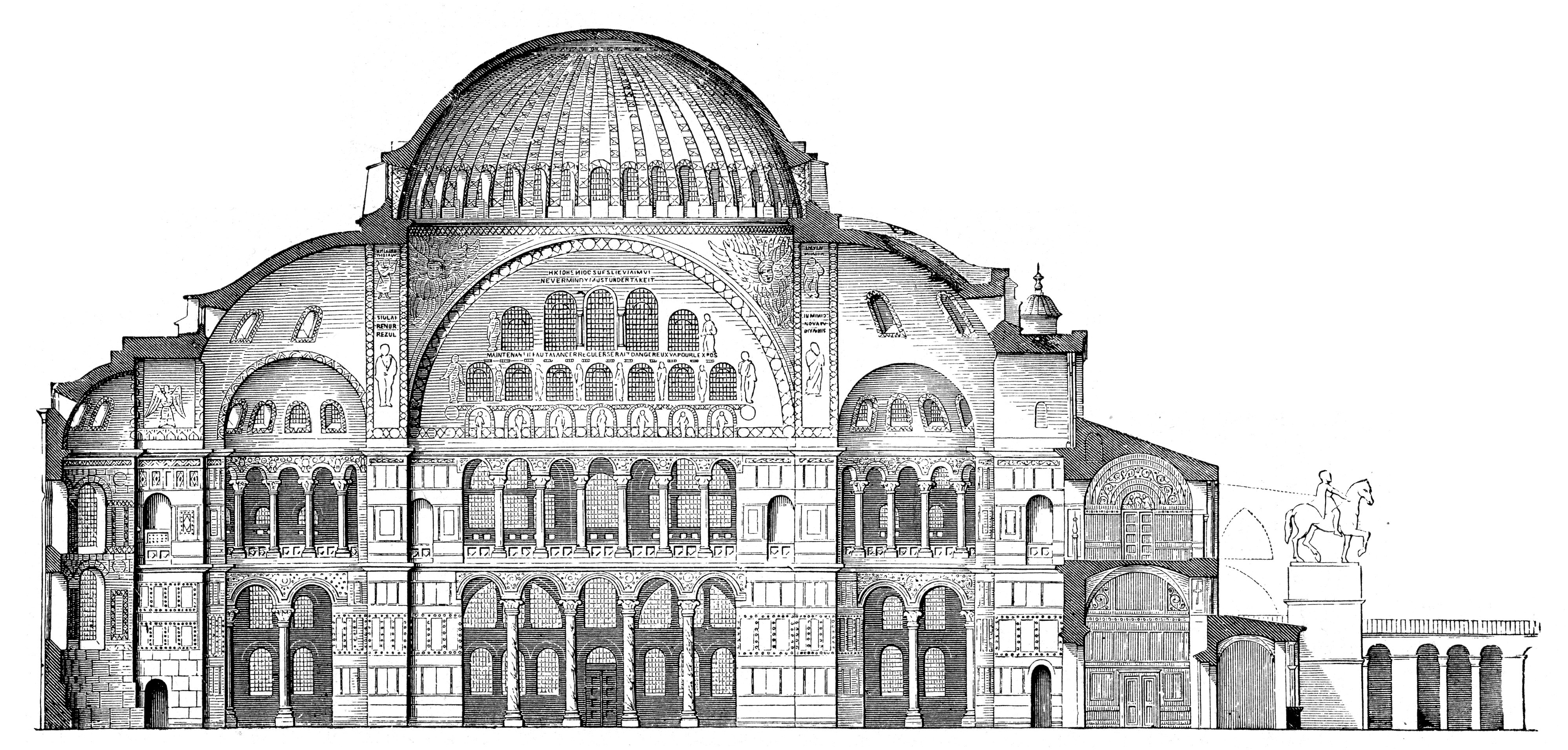
Reconstruction of the Hagia Sophia basilica of Constantinople

There are numerous churches dedicated to Holy Wisdom throughout the Eastern Orthodox world. Their archetype is the main basilica of Constantinople (now a mosque), built in the 6th century, in English simply known as the Hagia Sophia. The extant building of the Hagia Sophia dates to the 6th century. It is not entirely clear when the first church at the site had been dedicated to Hagia Sophia. The first church on the site, consecrated in 360 (during the reign of Constantius II), was simply known as the Μεγάλη Ἐκκλησία (Megálē Ekklēsíā, "Great Church", or in Latin Magna Ecclesia) A tradition which ascribes the church to Constantine the Great does not predate the 7th century.

The dedication of the Hagia Sophia of Constantinople under Justin II served as a template for the dedication of other Byzantine churches as well as early medieval churches in Italy prior to the Great Schism. Saint Sofia Church, Sofia is claimed as near-contemporary to the basilica in Constantinople. Hagia Sophia, Thessaloniki was built in the 8th century. Santa Sofia, Benevento was built in the 8th century, Santa Sofia, Venice in the 9th century and Santa Sofia, Padua in the 10th century. Saint Sophia Cathedral, Nicosia may or may not date from Late Antiquity, being first recorded in the 11th century (made a mosque in 1570).

Holy Wisdom became an important concept in Slavic Orthodoxy. Hagia Sophia Church, Nesebar, and possibly Church of St. Sophia, Ohrid, Bulgaria were built still in the 9th century. Saint Sophia Cathedral in Novgorod, Saint Sophia Cathedral in Kyiv and Saint Sophia Cathedral in Polotsk date to the 11th century. Saint Sophia Cathedral in Vologda was built in the 16th century. Saint Sophia Church, Moscow was built in the 17th century on the template of Novgorod cathedral. Saint Sophia Cathedral, Harbin, China, was built in 1907 under the Russian Empire after the completion of the Trans-Siberian Railway.

Churches dedicated to Holy Wisdom are to be distinguished from churches dedicated to the martyr Sophia of Rome (or one of the other early saints with this name, partly conflated with one another in hagiographical tradition). Such churches are much rarer and generally younger. An example is Chiesa di Santa Sofia, Capri, dedicated to Saints Sophia and Anthony (16th century). The church of Sortino is dedicated to the martyr Sophia of Sicily. Sophienkirche in Dresden was dedicated to Saint Sophia in honour of Sophie of Brandenburg who restored it in 1610.

== Hagiography and iconography ==
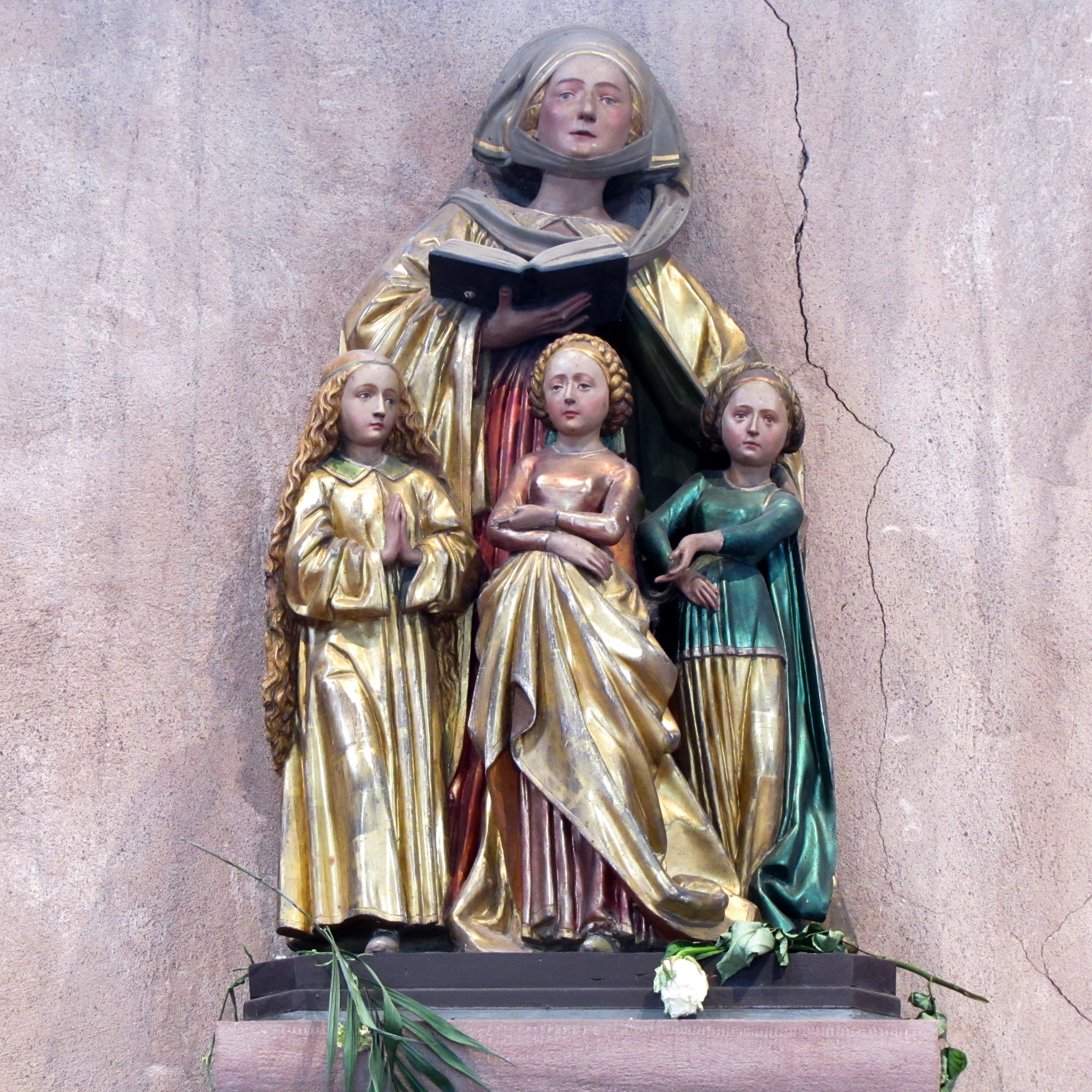
Late gothic wooden sculpture of saints Sophia, Faith, Hope and Charity (Eschau, 1470)

There is a hagiographical tradition, dating to the late 6th century, of a Saint Sophia and her three daughters, Saints Faith, Hope and Charity. This has been taken as the veneration of allegorical figures from an early time, and the group of saints has become popular in Russian Orthodox iconography as such (the names of the daughters rendered as Вѣра, Надежда, Любовь). Saxer (2000) notes that early Christians from the 4th century indeed often took in baptism mystical names indicative of Christian virtues, and Sophia, Sapientia, Fides are attested as names of Christian women in Catacomb inscriptions. The veneration of the three saints named for the three theological virtues probably arose in the 6th century based on such inscriptions.

In Russian Orthodox tradition, Holy Wisdom (Russian: Святая София Премудрость Божия Svatya Sofiya Premudrost' Bozhya "Holy Sophia, Divine Wisdom") is a conventional topos of iconography. In the "Novgorod type", named for the icon of Holy Wisdom in Saint Sophia Cathedral in Novgorod (16th century), but represented by the older icon in the Cathedral of the Annunciation, Moscow, dated to the early 15th century, Holy Wisdom is shown as a fiery angel with wings, seated on a throne and flanked by the Theotokos and by Saint Cosmas of Maiuma. A second type, known as "Wisdom hath builded her Home" (Премудрость созда Себе дом shows a complex theological allegory; this type becomes highly divergent from the 18th century onward reflecting the development of "sophiological" mysticism in Russia.

== Russian mysticism ==
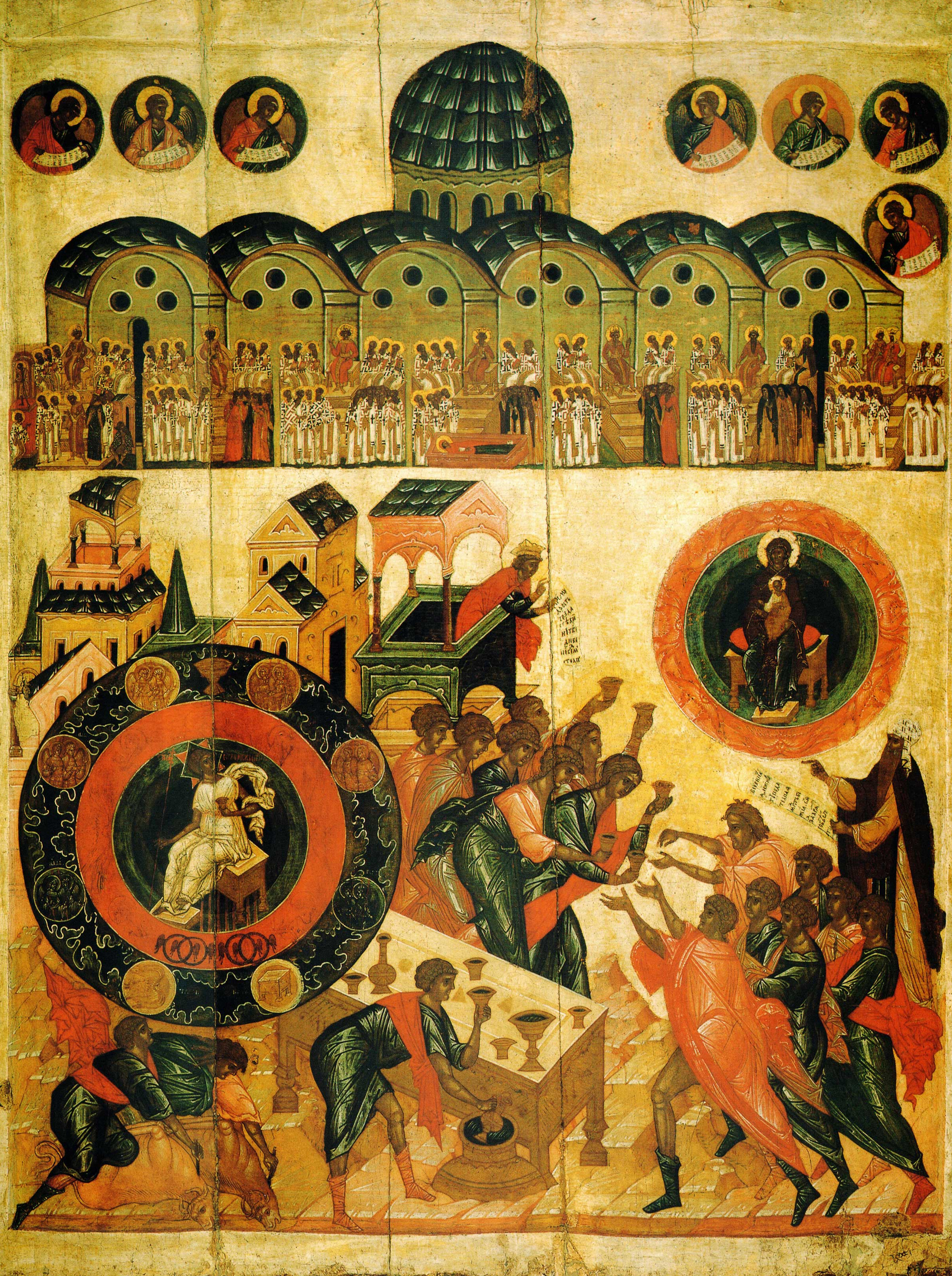
"Wisdom hath builded her house" (Премудрость созда Себе дом, Novgorod, 16th century).

The Christological identification of Christ the Logos with Divine Wisdom (Hagia Sophia) is strongly represented in the iconographic tradition of the Russian Orthodox Church. A type of icon of the Theotokos is "Wisdom hath builded Her house" (Премудрость созда Себе дом), a quote from Proverbs 9:1 ("Wisdom hath builded her house, she hath hewn out her seven pillars") interpreted as prefiguring the incarnation, with the Theotokos being the "house" chosen by the "hypostatic Wisdom" (i.e. "Wisdom" as a person of the Trinity).

In Russian Orthodox mysticism, Sophia became increasingly indistinguishable from the person of the Theotokos (rather than Christ), to the point of the implication of the Theotokos as a "fourth person of the Trinity". Such interpretations became popular in the late 19th to early 20th century, forwarded by authors such as Vladimir Solovyov, Pavel Florensky, Nikolai Berdyaev, and Sergei Bulgakov. Bulgakov's theology, known as "Sophianism", presented Divine Wisdom as co-existent with the Trinity, operating as the feminine aspect of God in concert with the three masculine principles of the Father, the Son, and the Holy Spirit. It was the topic of a highly political controversy in the early 1930s and was condemned as heretical in 1935.

John Maximovitch in The Orthodox Veneration of the Mother of God, discusses at length why the sophianism of Sergius Bulgakov is heresy, attempting the deification of the Theotokos.

"In the words [of Fr. Sergius Bulgakov], when the Holy Spirit came to dwell in the Virgin Mary, she acquired "a dyadic life, human and divine; that is, She was completely deified, because in Her hypostatic being was manifest the living, creative revelation of the Holy Spirit" (Archpriest Sergei Bulgakov, The Unburnt Bush, 1927, p. 154). "She is a perfect manifestation of the Third Hypostasis" (Ibid., p. 175), "a creature, but also no longer a creature" (P. 19 1)… But we can say with the words of St. Epiphanius of Cyprus: "There is an equal harm in both these heresies, both when men demean the Virgin and when, on the contrary, they glorify Her beyond what is proper" (Panarion, Against the Collyridians)."

Vladimir Lossky likewise rejects the teachings of Solovyev and Bulgakov. Lossky presents Divine Wisdom as an energy (and not an essence) of God, just as Faith, Hope and Charity are energies of God.

Thomas Merton studied the Russian Sophiologists and praised Sophia in his poem titled "Hagia Sophia" (1963).

The "sophological" approach of introducing Wisdom as a female principle in the Holy Trinity is closely paralleled by certain proposals made in feminist theology in the west. Thus, Elizabeth Johnson (1993) proposed the "application of Sophiological terminology to the Persons of the Holy Trinity" as a way of "normalizing feminine imagery for God". The parallels between the (apparently independent) currents of Russian mysticism and Western feminist theology was pointed out by Meehan (1996).

== Protestant mysticism ==
Within the Protestant tradition in England, Jane Leade, 17th-century Christian mystic, Universalist, and founder of the Philadelphian Society, wrote copious descriptions of her visions and dialogues with the "Virgin Sophia" who, she said, revealed to her the spiritual workings of the Universe.

Leade was hugely influenced by the theosophical writings of 16th century German Christian mystic Jakob Böhme, who also speaks of the Sophia in works such as The Way to Christ (1624). Jakob Böhme was very influential to a number of Christian mystics and religious leaders, including George Rapp and the Harmony Society.

== Shaker theology ==
For Shakers, Holy Mother Wisdom "will come forth and be revealed in her true order; and will be known, even as the Eternal Father is known" (Divine Book of Holy and Eternal Wisdom; Part VI; Chapter 2; Verse 22).

== Interfaith links ==
Through comparative religious studies, modern scholars found that the concept of Wisdom (Sophia) in the Old Testament has many similarities with the concept of Prajnaparamita in Buddhism, as both are considered to be the true nature of all phenomena, the true essence of all existences, the eternal mother that gives birth to all beings, and the transcendental wisdom leading to the ultimate Truth.

Additionally, scholars found that the East Asian philosophical concept Tao has many similarities with the concept of Wisdom (Sophia) in the Old Testament (or Word / Logos in the New Testament), as both are described as the ultimate source of creation and are honored as the Mother of all things.

== See also ==
- Sophia (wisdom)
- Sophia (Gnosticism)
- Tao
- Prajnaparamita
- Adi Parashakti
- Tathātā
- Christ the Logos
- Wisdom
- Ultimate Reality
- Seat of Wisdom
- Sophiology
- Gender of God in Christianity
- Gender of the Holy Spirit

== Literature ==
- Hunt, Priscilla, "The Novgorod Sophia Icon and 'The Problem of Old Russian Culture' Between Orthodoxy and Sophiology", Symposion: A Journal of Russian Thought, vol. 4–5 (2000), 1–41.
- O'Boyle, Aidan, Towards a Contemporary Wisdom Christology: Some Catholic Christologies in German, English and French 1965–1995, Rome. Pontificia Università Gregoriana (2003).
- O'Collins, Gerald, Salvation for All: God's Other Peoples. Oxford: OUP (2008), pp. 54–63, 230–47.
- O'Collins, Gerald, Christology: A Biblical, Historical, and Systematic Study of Jesus. Oxford: Oxford University Press, 2009, pp. 35–41
- Schipflinger, Thomas, Sophia-Maria (in German: 1988; English translation: York Beach, ME: Samuel Wiser, 1998) ISBN 1-57863-022-3.
- Versluis, Arthur, Theosophia: hidden dimensions of Christianity (Hudson, NY: Lindisfarne Press, 1994) ISBN 0-940262-64-9.
- Versluis, Arthur, Wisdom's children: a Christian esoteric tradition (Albany, NY: SUNY Press, 1999) ISBN 0-7914-4330-2.
- Versluis, Arthur (ed.) Wisdom's book: the Sophia anthology (St. Paul, MN: Paragon House, 2000) ISBN 1-55778-783-2.
