= Holy Wisdom (iconography) =

Topos of iconography

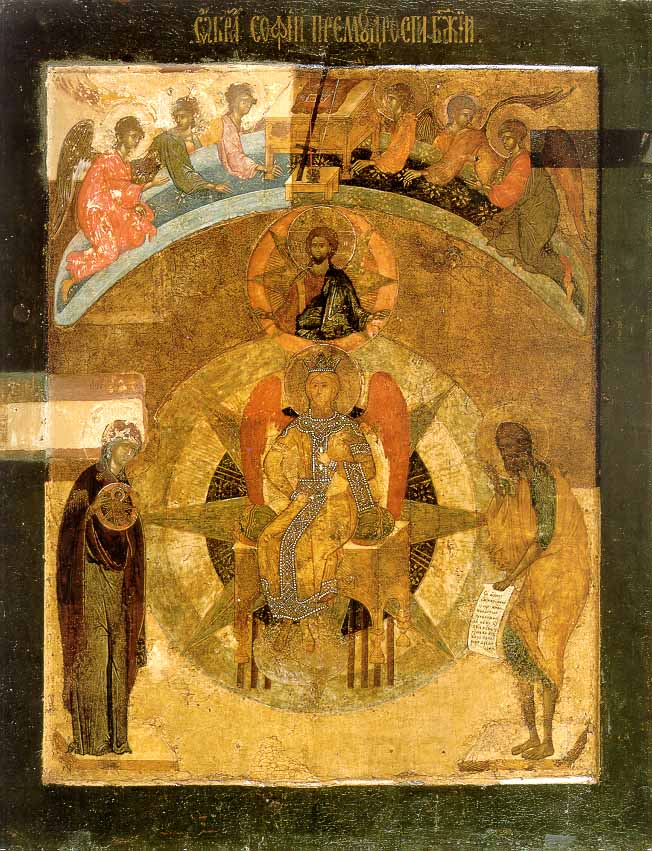
Holy Wisdom icon from the Annunciation Cathedral, Moscow (15th century)

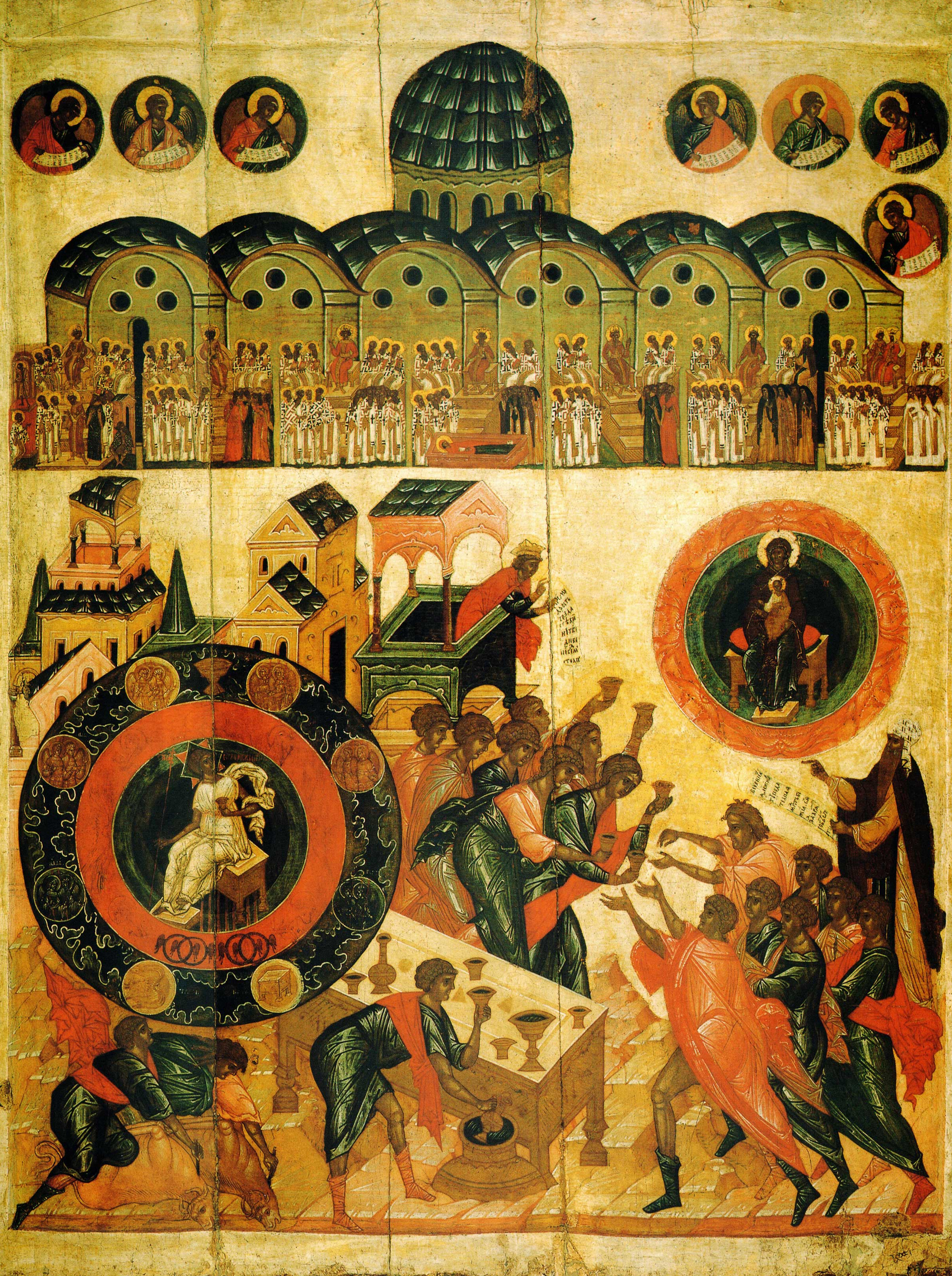
"Wisdom hath builded Her house" icon (16th century), from the Cathedral of Athanasius and Cyril of the Alexandrian Kirillov Monastery near Novgorod (now Russian Museum inv. no. 28830)

In Russian Orthodox tradition, Holy Wisdom (Russian: Святая София Премудрость Божия, romanized: Svatya Sofiya Premudrostʹ Bozhya, lit. 'Holy Sophia, Divine Wisdom') is a conventional topos of iconography, attested since at least the late 14th century.

The "Novgorod type" is named for the icon of Holy Wisdom in Saint Sophia Cathedral in Novgorod (16th century), but represented by the older icon in the Cathedral of the Annunciation, Moscow, dated to the early 15th century. Also known as "fire-winged" (огнекрылой), this type shows Holy Wisdom as a fiery angel with wings, seated on a throne and flanked by the Theotokos and by Saint Cosmas of Maiuma.

A related but highly divergent type is known as "Wisdom hath builded her Home" (Премудрость созда Себе дом). The name is a quotation of Proverbs 9:1 and references the incarnation of Christ the Logos, identified with Holy Wisdom, the "house" being the Theotokos. The earliest icon known under this title is a late-14th-century fresco in the Church of the Assumption in Volotovo Field, Veliky Novgorod, but its most notable representation is the mid-16th-century icon from the Cathedral of Athanasius and Cyril of the Alexandrian Kirillov Monastery near Novgorod.

The composition of these icons develops during the 17th and 18th century in a reflection of the developing views in Russian mysticism, culminating in the "Sophiology" dispute in the early 20th century. The main point of contention is the question whether "Wisdom", i.e. Christ, or the "House", i.e. the Theotokos, should take center stage.

In the original conception of this type, the Volotovo Field icon and derived examples of the 16th century, "Wisdom" is depicted as in the Novgorod type, as a fiery winged angel sitting on a throne, while the Theotokos with Child is shown separately. By the 18th century, there are two competing variants, one centered on crucified Christ and the other the Theotokos.

== See also ==
- Russian icons
- Sophiology
- Georges Florovsky
