= Saint Sophia Cathedral =

Saint Sophia Cathedral may refer to:

- Saint Sophia Cathedral in Harbin, the Russian Orthodox cathedral in Harbin, China
- Saint Sophia Cathedral in Kyiv, Ukraine
- Saint Sophia Cathedral in Novgorod, Russia
- Saint Sophia Cathedral in Polotsk, considered a mother church of Belarus
- Saint Sophia Cathedral, London, United Kingdom
- Saint Sophia Cathedral, Los Angeles, CA, United States
- Saint Sophia Cathedral, Sydney, Australia
- Saint Sophia Cathedral, Vologda, Russia
- Saint Sophia Cathedral, Washington, DC, United States
- Saint Sophie Ukrainian Orthodox Cathedral, Montreal, Canada

== See also ==
- Ascension Cathedral, Pushkin, Russia
- List of churches dedicated to Holy Wisdom
- Saint Sophia Church (disambiguation)
- Sofia Church (disambiguation)
- Sophia of Rome § Churches, for churches named after Saint Sophia of Rome
- Sophienkirche (disambiguation)
