= Saint Sophia Church =

Saint Sophia Church may refer to:

- Church of Saint Sophia, Ohrid, church in Ohrid, North Macedonia
- Saint Sophia Church (Nakhchivan-on-Don), church in Nakhchivan-on-Don, Rostov-on-Don city, Russia
- Saint Sophia Church, Moscow, church in Moscow, Russia
- Saint Sophia Church, Sofia, church in Sofia, Bulgaria
- St Sophia Greek Orthodox Church, Surry Hills, church in Surry Hills, New South Wales, Australia

== See also ==
- Hagia Sophia (disambiguation)
- List of churches dedicated to Holy Wisdom
- Saint Sophia Cathedral (disambiguation)
- Sofia Church (disambiguation)
- Sophia of Rome#Churches, for churches named after Saint Sophia of Rome
- Sophienkirche (disambiguation)
