= List of churches dedicated to Holy Wisdom =

Churches dedicated to Holy Wisdom (Hagia Sophia, also rendered Saint Sophia) include:

Name	City	Country	Age	Notes
Hagia Sophia	Constantinople (Istanbul)	Turkey	6th c.	Turned into a mosque after 1453, was a museum and now it is reverting to a mosque.
Little Hagia Sophia	Constantinople (Istanbul)	Turkey	6th c.	The Church of Saints Sergius and Bacchus in Constantinople (now Istanbul, Turkey), now a mosque.
Hagia Sophia, Edessa	Edessa (Urfa)	Turkey	6th c.	
Hagia Sophia, Iznik	Nicaea	Turkey	6th c.	Now a mosque
Saint Sofia Church, Sofia	Sofia	Bulgaria	6th c.	
Hagia Sophia, Thessaloniki	Thessaloniki	Greece	8th c.	
Santa Sofia, Benevento	Benevento	Italy	8th c.	
Hagia Sophia Church, Nesebar	Nesebar	Bulgaria	9th c.	
Church of Saint Sophia, Ohrid	Ohrid	North Macedonia	9th c.	
Santa Sofia, Venice	Venice	Italy	9th c.	
Santa Sofia Church (Padua)	Padua	Italy	10th c.	
Hagia Sophia, Drama	Drama	Greece	10th c.	
Saint Sophia Cathedral, Nicosia	Nicosia	Cyprus	11th c. (?)	Turned into a mosque in 1570.
Saint Sophia Cathedral in Polotsk	Polotsk	Belarus	11th c.	
Saint Sophia Cathedral, Kyiv	Kyiv	Ukraine	11th c.	
Saint Sophia Cathedral in Novgorod	Veliky Novgorod	Russia	11th c.	
Hagia Sophia, Monemvasia	Monemvasia	Greece	12th c.	
Hagia Sophia, Trabzon	Trabzon	Turkey	13th c.	Now a mosque
Hagia Sophia, Mystras	Mystras	Greece	14th c.	
Santa Sofia, Naples	Naples	Italy	1487	
Saint Sophia Cathedral, Vologda	Vologda	Russia	16th c.	
Saint Sophia Church, Moscow	Moscow	Russia	17th c.	
Saint Sophia Cathedral, Zhytomyr	Zhytomyr	Ukraine	1748	
St. Sophia Cathedral, Pushkin	Pushkin, Saint Petersburg	Russia	1788	
Nikolskaya Church	Kamenki, Nizhny Novgorod Oblast	Russia	1813	
Saint Sophia Cathedral, London	London	United Kingdom	1882	
Saint Sophia Cathedral in Harbin	Harbin	China	1907	
Saint Sophia Cathedral, Sydney	Sydney	Australia	1928	
Saint Sophia Cathedral, Washington, DC	Washington, D.C.	United States	1951	
Saint Sophia Cathedral, Los Angeles	Los Angeles	United States	1952	
Santa Sofia a Via Boccea	Rome	Italy	1968	
Chapel of Hagia Sophia	Faliraki	Greece		

== See also ==
- Sophia of Rome#Churches, for churches named after Saint Sophia of Rome
- Sofia Church (disambiguation), for churches named Sofia for some other reason
