= Hagia Sophia (disambiguation) =

Hagia Sophia is a mosque and former church in Istanbul, Turkey.

Hagia Sophia or Saint Sophia may also refer to:

- Holy Wisdom, a concept in Christian theology

== Churches ==
=== Australia ===
- Saint Sophia Cathedral, Sydney (1928), a Greek Orthodox cathedral in Paddington, Sydney, New South Wales
- St Sophia Greek Orthodox Church (c. 1980s), a Greek Orthodox church in Surry Hills, Sydney, New South Wales

=== Belarus ===
- Saint Sophia Cathedral in Polotsk (11th century), a cathedral in Polotsk

=== Bulgaria ===
- Saint Sofia Church, Sofia (6th century), a church in Sofia
- Hagia Sophia Church, Nesebar (9th century), a church in Nesebar

=== China ===
- Saint Sophia Cathedral, Harbin (1907), a church in Daoli, Harbin City, Heilongjiang Province

=== Cyprus ===
- Saint Sophia Cathedral, Nicosia (11th century), a former church in Nicosia; now a mosque since 1570

=== Greece ===
- Hagia Sophia, Thessaloniki, an 8th century church
- Hagia Sophia, Drama, a 10th century church
- Hagia Sophia, Monemvasia, a 12th century church
- Hagia Sophia, Mystras, a 14th century church

=== North Macedonia ===
- Saint Sophia, Ohrid (9th century), a church in Ohrid

=== Russia ===
- Saint Sophia Church, Moscow (17th century), a church in Moscow
- Saint Sophia Cathedral in Novgorod (11th century), a church in Novgorod
- Saint Sophia Cathedral, Pushkin (1788), a cathedral in Pushkin, St. Petersburg
- Saint Sophia Cathedral, Vologda (1570), a Russian Orthodox cathedral in Vologda

=== Turkey ===
- Little Hagia Sophia (6th century), originally a church in Constantinople, now a mosque
- Hagia Sophia, İznik (6th century), originally a church in Nicaea, now a mosque
- Hagia Sophia, Trabzon (13th century), originally a church in Trabzon, now a mosque

=== Ukraine ===
- Saint Sophia Cathedral, Kyiv (11th century), a cathedral in Kyiv
- Saint Sophia Cathedral, Zhytomyr (1748), a cathedral in the Roman Catholic Diocese of Kyiv-Zhytomyr

=== United Kingdom ===
- Saint Sophia Cathedral, London (1882), a cathedral in London

=== United States ===
- Saint Sophia Cathedral, Los Angeles (1952), a cathedral in Los Angeles
- Saint Sophia Cathedral (Washington, D.C.) (1951), a cathedral in Washington, D.C.

== Other uses ==
- SS Aghia Sophia, a 1896 passenger ferry better known as SS Sussex
- Agia Sophia Stadium, Nea Filadelfeia, Greece

== See also ==
- Ayasofya Mosque (disambiguation)
- Holy Wisdom (iconography)
- Sancta Sophia College, University of Sydney
- Sofia (disambiguation)
- Sofia Church (disambiguation)
- Sophia (disambiguation)
- Santa Sofia (disambiguation)
