= Saint Sophia =

Saint Sophia may refer to:

== People ==
- Sophia of Milan, Roman martyr
- Sophia of Rome (died 304), Roman martyr
- Sophia of Suzdal (c. 1490–1542), Russian Orthodox grand princess and nun
- Sophia of Slutsk (1585–1612) Polish-Lithuanian Orthodox princess

== Buildings ==
- Sancta Sophia College, University of Sydney, Australia
- Selimiye Mosque, Nicosia, formerly Cathedral of Saint Sophia, Cyprus

== See also ==
- Hagia Sophia (disambiguation)
- Sophia (disambiguation)
- Santa Sofia (disambiguation)
- Saint Sophia Cathedral (disambiguation)
- Sainte-Sophie, a municipality in Quebec
- Sainte-Sophie-d'Halifax, a municipality in Quebec
- Sainte-Sophie-de-Lévrard, a municipality in Quebec
- Holy Wisdom
