= Santa Sofia =

Santa Sofia may refer to:

== Places ==
- Santa Sofia d'Epiro, an Arberesh town and comune in Cosenza, Italy
- Santa Sofia, Emilia–Romagna, a comune in the Province of Forlì-Cesena in Emilia–Romagna, Italy
- Santa Sofía, Boyacá, a town and municipality in Boyacá, Colombia

== Churches and other buildings ==
- Santa Sofia, Benevento (8th century), a church in Benevento
- Santa Sofia, Naples (1487), a church in Naples
- Santa Sofia, Padua (10th century), a church in Padua
- Santa Sofia a Via Boccea (1968), a church in Rome
- Santa Sofia, Venice (11th century), a church in Venice
- Palazzo Santa Sofia, a palace in Mdina, Malta

== Other uses ==
- Santa Sofia, an alternative name for the Italian wine grape Fiano

== See also ==
- Hagia Sophia (disambiguation)
- Santa Sophia
- Sofia (disambiguation)
