= Ukrainian Catholic Eparchy of Saints Peter and Paul of Melbourne =

Ukrainian Catholic jurisdiction in Australia

Eparchy of Saints Peter and Paul of Melbourne (Ukrainian) Eparchia Sanctorum Petri et Pauli Melburnensis Ucrainorum Мельбурнська єпархія святих апостолів Петра й Павла
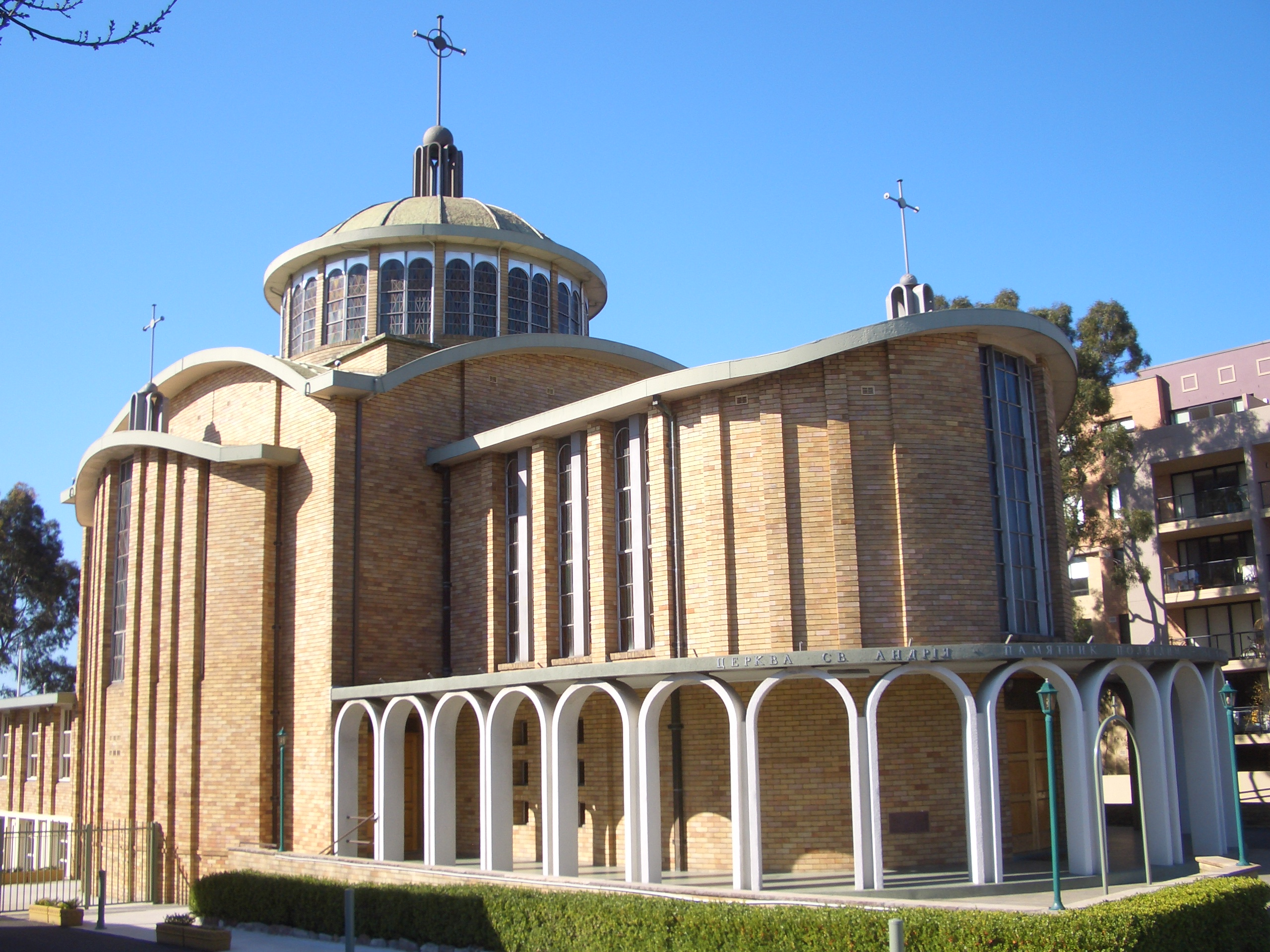

Location
- Country: Australia
- Territory: Australia, New Zealand and Oceania
- Ecclesiastical province: Melbourne (Latin)
- Headquarters: Melbourne
- Coordinates: 37°47′47″S 144°56′39″E

Statistics
- Population: (as of 2009); ▼32,500
- Parishes: ▲10

Information
- Denomination: Catholic Church
- Sui iuris church: Ukrainian Greek Catholic Church
- Rite: Byzantine Rite
- Established: 10 May 1958 as Apostolic Exarchate of Australia; 24 June 1982 as Ukrainian Catholic Eparchy of Saints Peter and Paul
- Cathedral: Cathedral of St. Peter & St. Paul
- Patron saint: St. Peter and St. Paul
- Language: Ukrainian

Current leadership
- Pope: Leo XIV
- Patriarch: Sviatoslav Shevchuk
- Eparch: Mykola Bychok, C.Ss.R.

Website
- catholicukes.org.au

The Eparchy of Saints Peter and Paul of Melbourne (Note: Latin: Eparchia Sanctorum Petri et Pauli Melburnensis Ucrainorum; Ukrainian: Мельбурнська єпархія святих апостолів Петра й Павла, romanized: Mel'burns'ka yeparkhiya svyatykh apostoliv Petra y Pavla) is a Ukrainian Greek Catholic Church ecclesiastical territory or eparchy of the Catholic Church in Australia. Headquartered in Melbourne, it is a suffragan in the ecclesiastical province of the metropolitan Archbishop of Melbourne, a Latin Church territory.

The Cathedral of Saints Peter and Paul, in North Melbourne, Victoria, is the episcopal church of the eparch, currently Mykola Bychok CSsR.

== Status and jurisdiction ==
Like all Catholic dioceses in Australia, the eparchy is a member of the Australian Catholic Bishops' Conference. The Catholic Church is made up of the Latin Church and 23 Eastern Catholic particular churches sui iuris, one of which is the Ukrainian Greek Catholic Church.

The eparchy is non-geographic, but demographic in that it has jurisdiction wherever Ukrainian Greeks are found in Australia, New Zealand, and throughout Oceania. It has 17 churches and missions, several schools, nursing homes and other institutions in Australia and New Zealand.

== History ==
The eparchy began on 10 May 1958 as the apostolic exarchate for Ukrainians of the Byzantine Rite in Australia, New Zealand and Oceania. (Apostolic exarchs, like apostolic visitors, are "exempt", that is, they are responsible to the Holy See. They are usually in missionary areas where the ordinary infrastructure of eparchies or dioceses is scanty.)

The exarchate was superseded on 24 June 1982 by its becoming the eparchy (that is, diocese) of Melbourne. Since there was already an Archbishopric of Melbourne, and it is not customary to have two bishops with identically named sees, the exarchate is described as "the Eparchy of Saints Peter & Paul of Melbourne" and is notionally a suffragan see of the (Latin) Archdiocese of Melbourne.

On 22 March 2023, the Eparchy of Saints Peter and Paul of Melbourne, according to the decree of Bishop Mykola Bychok, decided that from 1 September 2023, the UGCC in Australia and Oceania will completely switch to the Gregorian calendar, including Easter, unlike the UGCC in Eurasia.

On 24 March 2023, Bishop Mykola stated that the main intention of the calendar reform of the UGCC in Australia and Oceania is to be in unity with the Catholic Church in general, and with the UGCC in particular. Bishop Mykola emphasized that only the dates will change, but the traditions of celebrating Ukrainians in Australia will remain unchanged:

This step is difficult, perhaps painful for some parishioners. But we, as a diocese that is part of the UGCC, were also obliged to take this step in order to live in unity. I sincerely admit that for me this decision [about calendar reform in Ukraine] was a shock. As a bishop, I did not expect it to be accepted so quickly. Very often, people put a political rather than a spiritual meaning in it to a certain extent. Because for many, the question now is to detach as much as possible from Russia, from Moscovia. And they consider this the main direction in church life as well, so as not to have a common Christmas with Russia. On the one hand, this is good. On the other hand, the change of the calendar has much deeper spiritual roots. It's not just Christmas and Easter, but bigger changes.

== Parishes ==
=== Australia ===
- In Victoria, parishes are located in North Melbourne (Ukrainian Catholic Cathedral of Saints Peter and Paul), Wodonga (Church of St Olha), Ardeer (The Dormition of the Blessed Virgin), Geelong (Protection of the Mother of God) and Noble Park (Mission of Blessed Mykolay Charnetsky).
- In New South Wales, parishes are located in Lidcombe (St Andrew's Church), Wollongong (St Volodymyr's), Adamstown (Protection of the Mother of God), and Queanbeyan (St Michael's).
- In the Australian Capital Territory, a parish is located in Lyneham (Church of St Volodymyr).
- In South Australia, parishes are located in Wayville (Our Lady of Protection) and Woodville (Saints Volodymyr and Olha).
- In Queensland, a parish is located in Woolloongabba (Protection of the Mother of God).
- In Western Australia, parishes are located in Maylands (St John the Baptist) and Northam (Church of the Nativity of the Blessed Virgin).
- In Tasmania, parishes are located in Hobart (The Transfiguration of our Lord) and Launceston (Holy Family)

=== New Zealand ===
Church services are held in

- Auckland (Mother of Perpetual Help Church).
- Christchurch (St Peter's Church)
- Wellington (Sacred Heart Cathedral chapel)

== Eparchial bishops ==
The following individuals have been appointed apostolic exarch and/or elected as Ukrainian Eparch of Saints Peter and Paul of Melbourne:

Order	Name	Title	Date enthroned	Reign ended	Term of office	Reason for term end
1	Ivan Prasko †	Apostolic Exarch of Australia (Ukrainian)	10 May 1958	24 June 1982	24 years, 45 days	Elevated as Bishop of Ss Peter & Paul of Melbourne
1	Ivan Prasko †	Eparch (Bishop) of Ss Peter & Paul of Melbourne (Ukrainian), titular bishop of Zygris	24 June 1982	16 December 1992	10 years, 175 days	Retired
2	Peter Stasiuk C.Ss.R.	Eparch of Ss Peter & Paul of Melbourne	16 December 1992	15 January 2020	27 years, 30 days	Retired
3	Mykola Bychok C.Ss.R.	Eparch of Ss Peter & Paul of Melbourne	15 January 2020	Present	6 years, 128 days	

== See also ==
- Catholicism in Australia
- Ukrainian Greek Catholic Church
