= Sofia Church (disambiguation) =

Sofia Church, named for Swedish queen Sophia of Nassau, is in Stockholm, Sweden.

Sofia Church may also refer to:

- Sofia Church, Jönköping, named for Sofia-Järstorp Parish, in Jönköping, Sweden
- Sofia Albertina Church, named for Sophia Albertina, in Landskrona, Scania, Sweden

== See also ==
- List of churches dedicated to Holy Wisdom
- List of churches in Sofia, Bulgaria
- Sophia of Rome § Churches, for churches named after Saint Sophia of Rome
- Hagia Sophia (disambiguation)
- Ascension Cathedral, Pushkin, Russia
- Sophienkirche (disambiguation)
- Saint Sophia Church (disambiguation)
