= The Martyrdom of Saint Justina =

Painting by Paolo Veronese

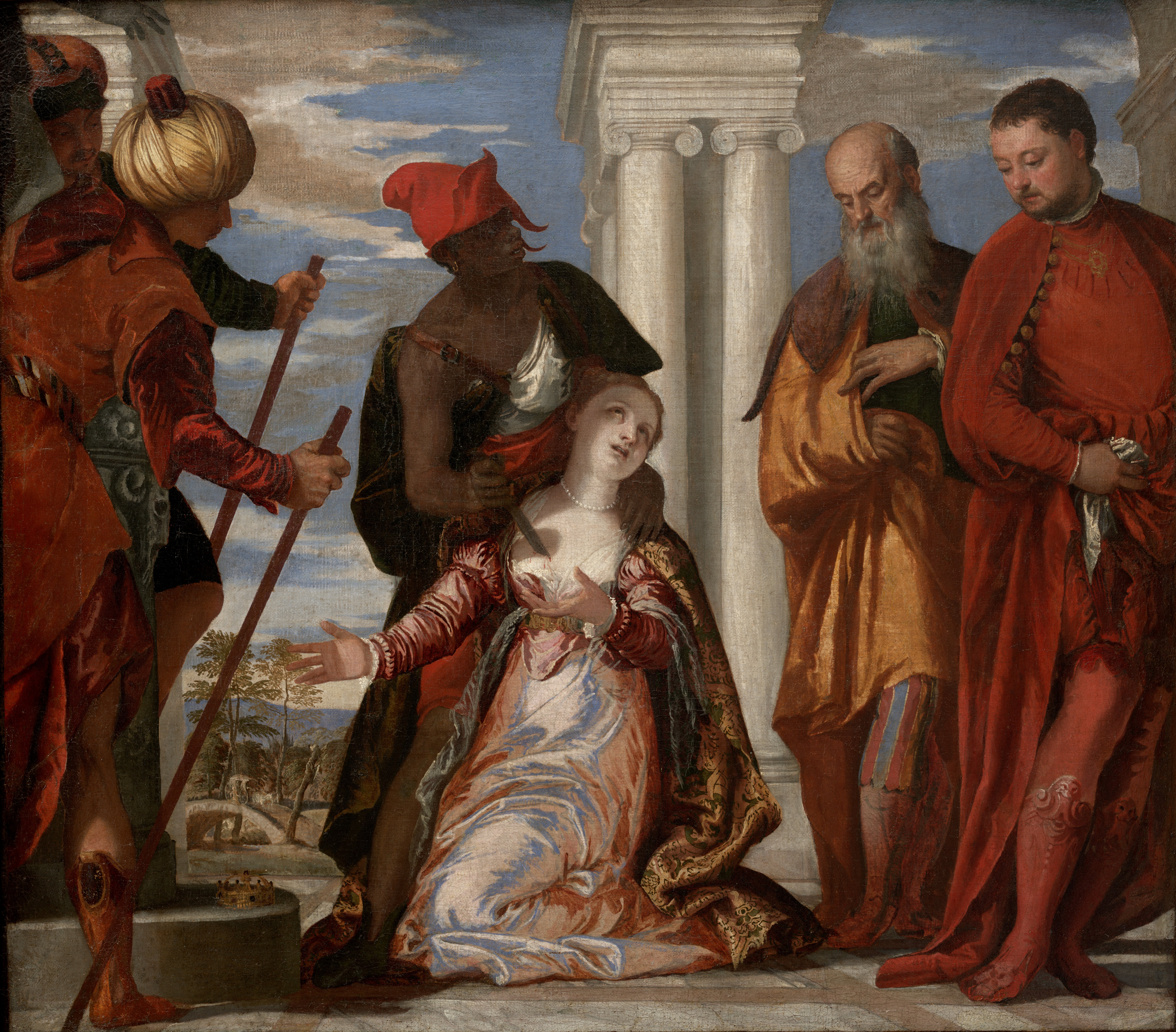
- Artist: Paolo Veronese
- Year: c. 1570–1575
- Medium: oil on canvas
- Dimensions: 103 cm × 115 cm (41 in × 45 in)
- Location: Uffizi, Florence

The Martyrdom of Saint Justina is a c.1570–1575 oil-on-canvas painting by the Italian painter Paolo Veronese, with assistance from his younger brother. It was originally produced for Santa Giustina Basilica in Padua and now is held in the Uffizi, in Florence. It shows the martyrdom of Justina of Padua.

A painting on this subject – probably this work – is recorded in the Canonici collection in Ferrara in 1632. From there it passed into the collection of Paolo del Sera, agent and intermediary in Venice for cardinal Leopoldo de' Medici. The cardinal himself acquired it and Veronese's Annunciation from del Sera in 1654 and brought them both to Florence. Martyrdom was restored in 1988.
