= Sophia =

Sophia most commonly refers to:

- Sophia (Gnosticism), a feminine figure in Gnosticism
- Sophia (wisdom), a central idea in Hellenistic philosophy and religion
- Sophia (given name), including a list of people and fictional characters named Sophia or Sofia

Sophia or SOPHIA may also refer to:

== Arts and entertainment ==
=== Music ===
- Sophia (Japanese band)
- Sophia (singer) or Sophia Abrahão, pop singer from Brazil
- Sophia (British band), musical project of Robin Proper-Sheppard, former guitarist and singer of The God Machine
- Sophia (The Crüxshadows EP)
- Sophia (Sophia Abrahão EP)
- "Sophia" (Nerina Pallot song)
- "Sophia" (Laura Marling song)
- "Sophia", a song from Think Before You Speak by Good Shoes
- "Sophia", a song from Mother's Spiritual by Laura Nyro
- "Sophia", a song from Dust and Chimes by Six Organs of Admittance

=== Other uses in arts and entertainment ===
- Sophia (TV series), a Russian historical drama
- Sophia (novel) by Charlotte Lennox (1762)

== Places ==
- Sophia, Bulgaria, the capital city
- Sophia, Georgetown, a ward of Georgetown, Guyana
- Sophia, North Carolina, United States, an unincorporated community
- Sophia, West Virginia, United States, a town
- Niulakita or Sophia, an island of Tuvalu
- 251 Sophia, an asteroid

== Other uses ==
- Sophia (robot), a humanoid robot and Saudi Arabian citizen developed in Hong Kong (2017)
- Operation Sophia, a 2015 European Union Naval Force operation in the Mediterranean
- Sophia (journal), a periodical about religious and theological philosophy
- Society for the Promotion of Himalayan Indigenous Activities (SOPHIA), a nongovernmental organization based in Dehradun, Uttarakhand, India

== See also ==
- Hagia Sophia (disambiguation)
- Saint Sophia (disambiguation)
- Sofia (disambiguation)
- Sophie, a variant spelling
- Sophy, a variant spelling
- Sophiology, a philosophical concept regarding wisdom, as well as a theological concept regarding the wisdom of God
