= Ivan Prasko =

Ivan Prasko, MBE
- Ukrainian Catholic Eparchy of Saints Peter and Paul of Melbourne
- Church: Ukrainian Greek Catholic Church
- Appointed: 10 May 1958 (as Apostolic Exarch); 24 June 1982 (as Eparchial Bishop)
- In office: 10 May 1958 – 16 December 1992
- Predecessor: New creation
- Successor: Peter Stasiuk
- Other post: Titular Bishop of Zygris (1958–1982)

Orders
- Ordination: 2 April 1939 (Priest) by Dionisije Njaradi
- Consecration: 19 October 1958 (Bishop) by Maxim Hermaniuk

Personal details
- Born: Ivan Prasko; 1 May 1914 Zbarazh, Austria-Hungary, now Ukraine
- Died: 28 January 2001 (aged 86) Melbourne, Australia

Ivan Prasko, MBE (1 May 1914 – 28 January 2001) was the eparch of Australia, New Zealand and Oceania for the Ukrainian Catholic Church.

He was born in Zbarazh, Ternopil, Ukraine. He studied at the theological academy in Lviv and then in Rome at the Pontifical College Damascenum and the Pontifical University Urbanianum. He was ordained in Rome on 2 April 1939. He continued his studies at the Pontifical University Gregorianum and at the Pontifical Oriental Institute and was awarded a doctorate in 1943.

Prasko served as pastor of Ss Peter and Paul Church in Melbourne from 1950 to 1958 before being consecrated Exarch of Australia and New Zealand on 17 October 1958. He became eparch of Australia, New Zealand and Oceania, 24 June 1982, when the exarchate was raised to an eparchy. Under his leadership, the Ukrainian Catholic Church served as "the genesis of the Ukrainian community and identity in Australia". For his efforts in community building, he was appointed as a Member of the Most Excellent Order of the British Empire.

He participated in the Second Vatican Council as a Council Father in 1960th.
