= Annunciation (Veronese, Uffizi) =

Painting by Paolo Veronese

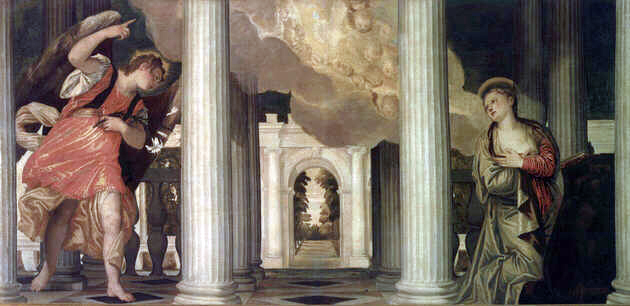
- Artist: Paolo Veronese
- Year: c. 1556
- Medium: oil on canvas
- Dimensions: 143 cm × 291 cm (56 in × 115 in)
- Location: Uffizi, Florence

Annunciation is an oil-on-canvas painting, now in the Uffizi in Florence. It and The Martyrdom of Saint Justina were bought in Venice by Paolo del Sera, intermediary and agent for cardinal Leopoldo de' Medici in 1654.

It is usually attributed to Veronese, though Giovanni Battista Zelotti, Adolfo Venturi and Arslan have attributed it to Giovanni Battista Zelotti, with Arslan initially suggesting it was a collaboration between Veronese and Zelotti. Fiocco argued it was an early work by Veronese, though Pallucchini's theory that Veronese painted it around 1555 (about the same time as Coronation of Saint Sebastian) is now accepted by the majority of art historians.
