= Sofia (disambiguation) =

Sofia is the capital and largest city of Bulgaria.

Sofia may also refer to:

== People ==
- Sofia (given name), includes a list of notable people with the name
- Sofia (Filipino singer), a bossa nova singer from the Philippines
- Sofia (Swedish singer), full name Sofia Berntson

== Places ==
- Sofía (Echinades), an island of the Ionian Islands of Greece
- Sofia, Drochia, a commune in Drochia district, Moldova
- Sofia, Hînceşti, a commune in Hînceşti district, Moldova
- Sofia, New Mexico, an unincorporated community in Union County, New Mexico, US
- Sofia Province, a province of Bulgaria
- Sofia Region, a region in northern Madagascar
- Sofia Valley, a valley in Bulgaria
- The Sofia, an apartment building in New York City

== Arts, entertainment, and media ==
=== Films ===
- Sofia (1948 film), an American film shot in Mexico set in Sofia
- Sofia (1987 film), an Argentine film
- Sofia (2018 film), a Belgian film
- Assassin's Bullet, a 2012 American film alternately titled Sofia in some international markets

=== Music ===
- "Sofia" (Álvaro Soler song), 2016
- "Sofia" (Clairo song), 2019

=== Television ===
- Sofia the First, a Disney television program starring Ariel Winter in the title role
- Sofia the First: Royal Magic, 2026 sequel of the same name Disney television program

=== Other uses in arts, entertainment, and media ===
- Sofia (Battle Arena Toshinden), a character in the fighting game series

== Science and technology ==
- SoFIA (Smart or Feature -phone with Intel Architecture) a microarchitecture design for Intel Atom chips
- Stratospheric Observatory for Infrared Astronomy (SOFIA), a joint project of NASA and the German Aerospace Center (DLR) for an airborne telescope
- Surround Optical Fiber Immunoassay (SOFIA), an ultra-sensitive diagnostic platform

== See also ==
- Hagia Sophia (disambiguation)
- Sophia (disambiguation)
- Santa Sofia (disambiguation)
