= St Justina of Padua with a Donor =

c. 1530 painting by Moretto da Brescia

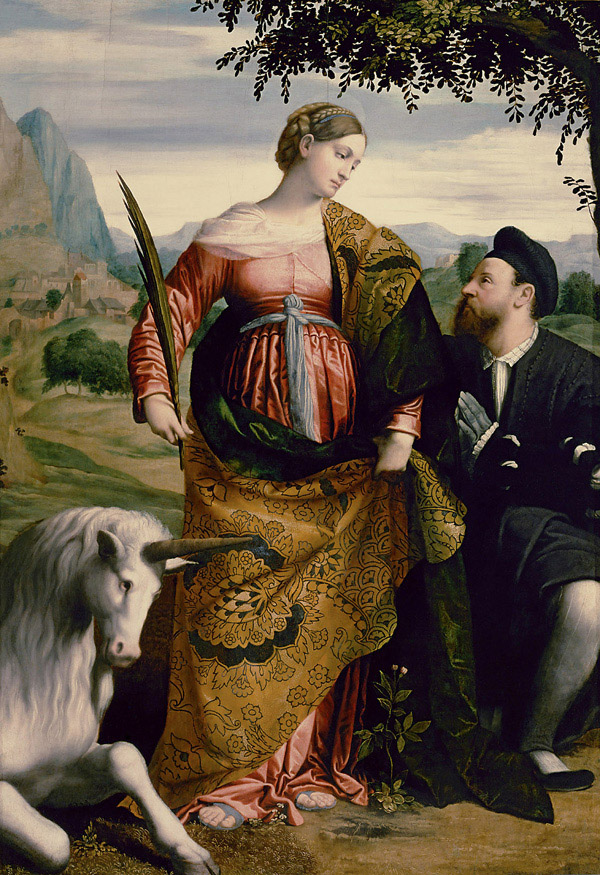
St Justina of Padua with a Donor (c. 1530) by Moretto da Brescia

St Justina of Padua with a Donor is an oil on panel painting by Moretto da Brescia, executed c. 1530, now in the Kunsthistorisches Museum in Vienna, to which it was transferred in the late 19th century soon after the museum's opening. It shows Justina of Padua.

Its original location is unknown and no documents survive stating its provenance or commissioner. The first surviving reference to the work is in a 1662 document relating to its move from the Hofburg to Ambras Castle (it was then in the Holy Roman Empire's collections). That document referred to it as a work by Titian and in inventories immediately before the move it was ascribed to Raphael. A 1733 inventory re-attributed it yet again, this time to Pordenone. In 1845 Ransonnet restored its correct attribution to Moretto.

== Bibliography ==
- Bernard Berenson, The North Italian Painters of the Renaissance, New York-London 1907
- (in Italian) Camillo Boselli, Il Moretto, 1498-1554, in "Commentari dell'Ateneo di Brescia per l'anno 1954 - Supplemento", Brescia 1954
- Joseph Archer Crowe, Giovanni Battista Cavalcaselle, A history of painting in North Italy, London 1871
- (in Italian) Giuseppe Fiocco, Pittori bresciani del Rinascimento: Alessandro Bonvicino detto Moretto di Brescia in "Emporium", anno 45, numero 6, Brescia 1939
- György Gombosi, Moretto da Brescia, Basilea 1943
- (in Italian) Valerio Guazzoni, Moretto. Il tema sacro, Brescia 1981
- (in Italian) Roberto Longhi, Cose bresciane del Cinquecento, in "L'arte", anno 20, Brescia 1917
- (in Italian) Giorgio Vasari, Le vite de' più eccellenti pittori, scultori e architettori scritte da M. Giorgio Vasari pittore aretino - Con nuove annotazioni e commenti di Gaetano Milanesi, Firenze 1881
- (in Italian) Carl Ransonnet, Sopra un dipinto di Alessandro Bonvicino soprannominato il Moretto di Brescia, versione italiana con note, Brescia 1845
- (in Italian) Pier Virgilio Begni Redona, Alessandro Bonvicino - Il Moretto da Brescia, Editrice La Scuola, Brescia 1988
- (in Italian) Adolfo Venturi, Storia dell'arte italiana, volume IX, La pittura del Cinquecento, Milano 1929
