= Felicitas of Padua =

Nun and saint (9th century)

Saint Felicitas of Padua
- Died: Ninth century
- Venerated in: Roman Catholic Church
- Feast: March 26

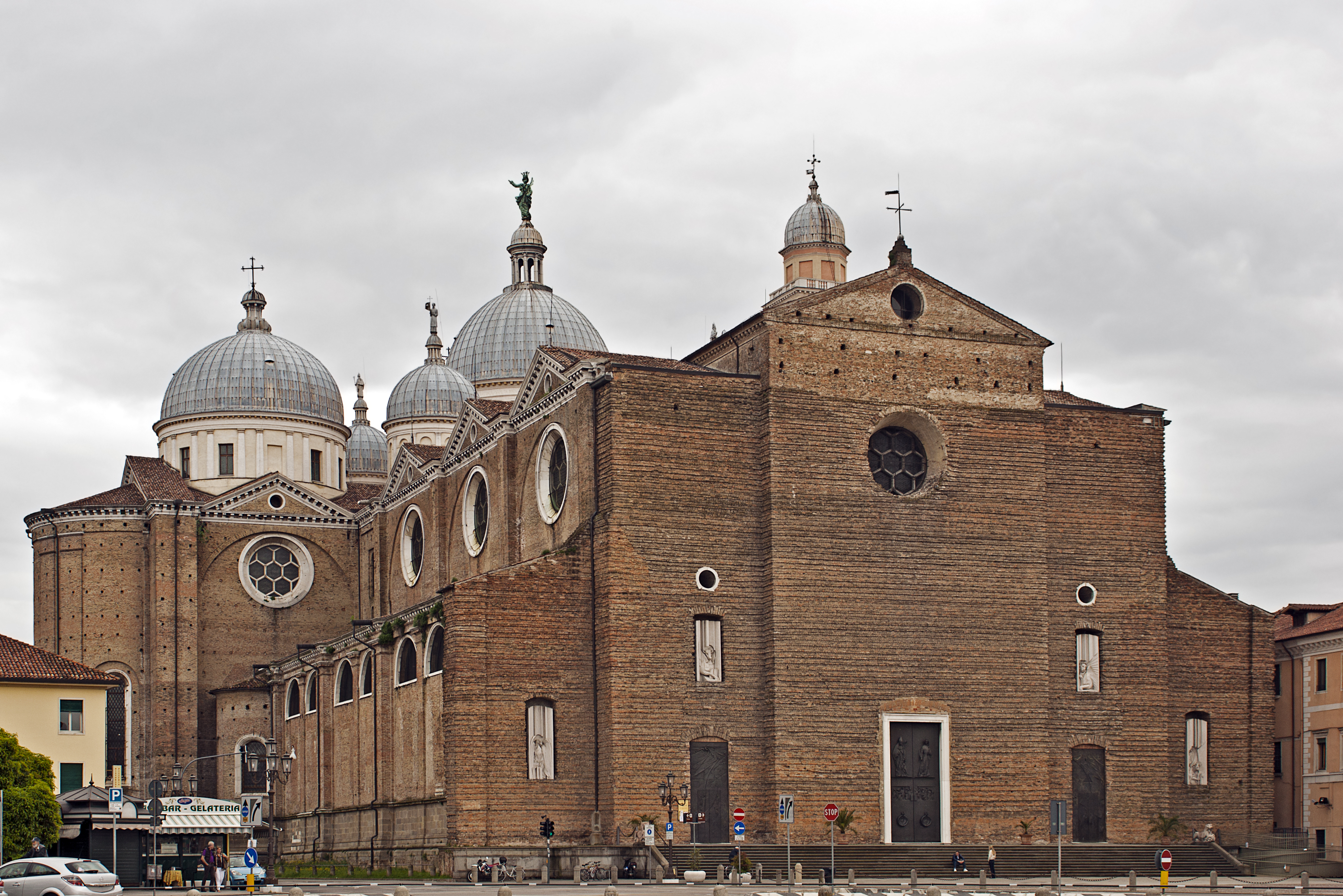
The Basilica of Saint Justina, Padua, where Saint Felicitas' relics now reside.

Felicitas of Padua is a saint in the Roman Catholic Church. She lived in the ninth century, and was a nun in Padua, probably at the convent of Saints Cosmas and Damian. Her relics are now in the Basilica of Saint Justina, Padua.
