= Sts. Peter and Paul Cathedral, Melbourne =

Sts. Peter and Paul Cathedral
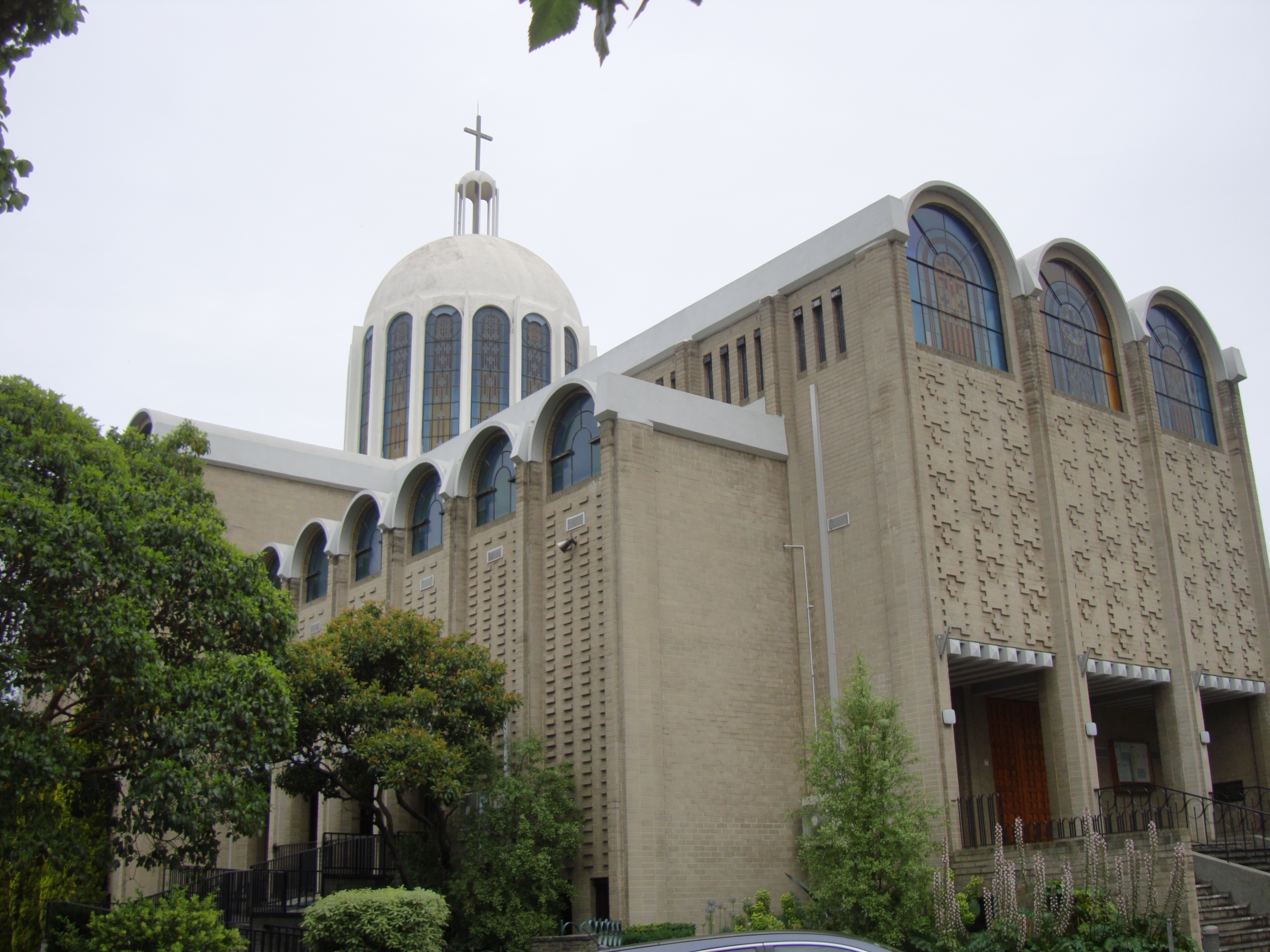

- Location within Melbourne
- 37°47′47″S 144°56′39″E
- Location: Melbourne
- Country: Australia
- Denomination: Catholic (Ukrainian or Byzantine rite)

Clergy
- Bishop: Mykola Bychok

The Sts. Peter and Paul Cathedral also called Sts. Peter and Paul Ukrainian Catholic Cathedral is a religious building of the Catholic Church of Byzantine or Ukrainian rite that is located in the North Melbourne suburb of central Melbourne, the capital city of the state of Victoria in Australia. It should not be confused with the Latin or Roman rite cathedral of Melbourne dedicated to Saint Patrick or with the Syro-Malabar Catholic Cathedral dedicated to St. Alfonsa.

The building is the seat of the Ukrainian Catholic Eparchy of Saint Peter and Paul of Melbourne (Eparchia Sanctorum Petri and Pauli Melburnensis Ucrainorum) which began as an apostolic exarch in 1958 with the bull "Singularem huius" of Pope Pius XII and was raised to its current status in 1982 through the bull "Christum Iesum" of Pope John Paul II.

It is under the pastoral responsibility of Mykola Bychok.

== See also ==
- Roman Catholicism in Australia
