= Justina of Padua =

Christian saint

Saint Justina of Padua
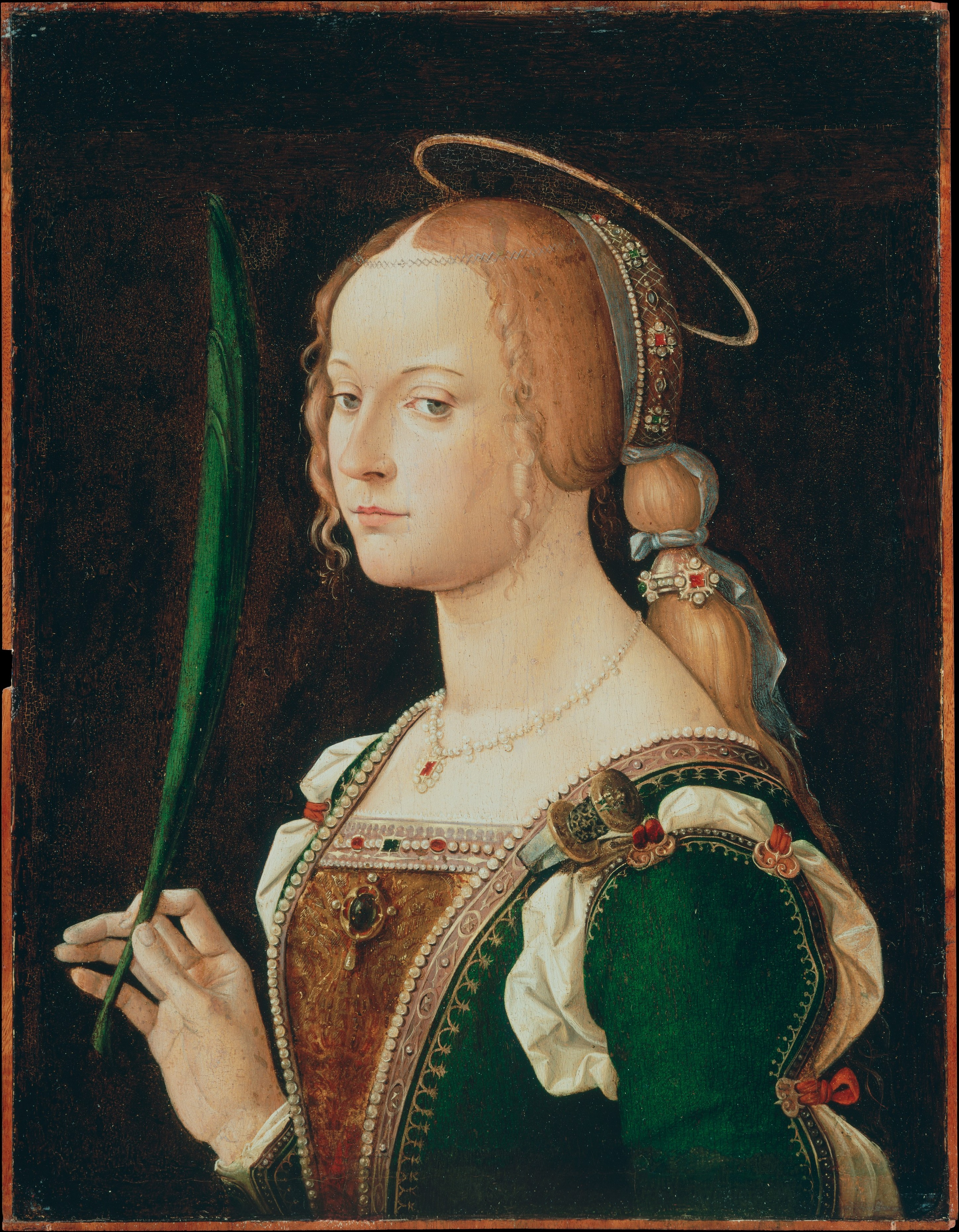
- Painting by Bartolomeo Montagna, 1490s

Virgin, Martyr
- Born: Patavium, Italia, Roman Empire
- Venerated in: Roman Catholic Church; Eastern Orthodox Church
- Major shrine: Abbey of Santa Giustina
- Feast: October 7
- Attributes: Young woman setting a cross on the head of the devil while holding a lily in her hand; young woman with a crown, palm, and sword; young woman with a palm, book, and a sword in her breast; young woman with a unicorn, symbolizing virginity, and palm; young woman with Saint Prosdocimus
- Patronage: Padua, Palmanova, Venice

Justina of Padua (Italian: Santa Giustina di Padova; Venetian: Santa Justina de Pàdoa) is a Christian saint and a patroness of the city of Padua. Her feast day is October 7. She was devoted to religion from her earliest years and took the vow of perpetual virginity. When she was brought before Maximian the prefect, she remained firm against all attacks. The prefect caused her to be slain with a sword.

== Hagiography ==
Justina was a virgin of noble birth in the city which claims her patronage, i.e. Padua who lived some time between the 1st and 3rd centuries. Her father Vitalian was a rich nobleman and prefect of Padua. Her parents were reportedly converted to Christianity by the preaching of Saint Prosdocimus, the first bishop of Padua, and not having been blessed with children up to that time, they received Justina in answer to their prayer.

A forged document from 1117 made the claim that Justina's relics had been found in Padua and that she had been baptized by Prosdocimus (d. c. 100 CE), an impossibility given that she died during the Christian persecutions of Roman emperor Maximian.

She was devoted to religion from her earliest years and ultimately she took the vow of perpetual virginity. At this time arose the persecutions of the Christians by Diocletian and Maximian the prefect who had succeeded Vitalian, proved himself particularly brutal. As Justina would visit the prisons to comfort and encourage the Christians there, Maximian ordered her arrest. While she was passing by the Pont Marin near Padua she was seized by the soldiers. When she was brought before Maximian he was struck by her beauty and endeavoured by every means to shake her constancy. However, she remained firm against all attacks and the prefect caused her to be slain with a sword.

== Veneration ==
Saint Justina is a patron saint of Padua. After Saint Mark, she is also a second patroness of Venice. Her feast day is October 7 and coincided with the end of the grape harvest and the time for settling agricultural contracts.

In the 6th century the Paduans dedicated a church to her and she was among the virgin martyrs portrayed in the presbytery arch in the Euphrasian Basilica (at left) and in the procession of virgins in Sant'Apollinare Nuovo. In the 7th century, Venantius Fortunatus, writing in Gaul, urged travellers to Padua to visit her relics there.

The Paduan Basilica and Abbey of Santa Giustina house the Martyrdom of Saint Justina by Paolo Veronese. The Abbey complex was founded in the 5th century on Justina's tomb, and in the 15th century became one of the most important monasteries in the area, until it was suppressed by Napoleon in 1810. In 1919 it was reopened. The tombs of several saints are housed in the interior, including those of Justina, Prosdocimus, Saint Maximus, Saint Urius, Saint Felicitas, Saint Julian, as well as relics of the Apostle Saint Matthias and the Evangelist Saint Luke.

=== Iconography ===
Justina is represented in Christian art crowned as a princess, and with a sword transfixing her bosom, in accordance with her martyrdom in AD 303.

== Gallery ==
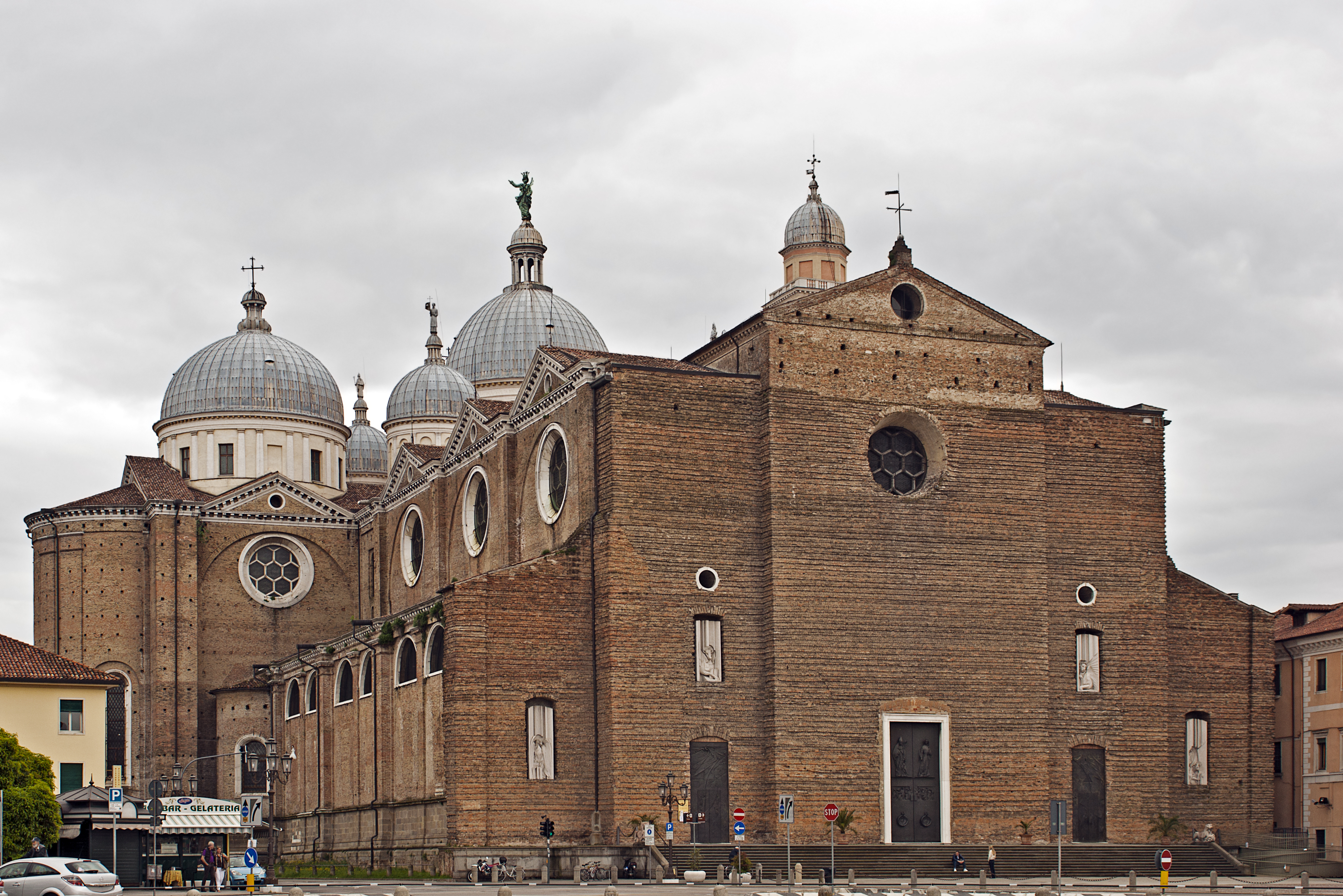
Basilica of Santa Giustina, Padua

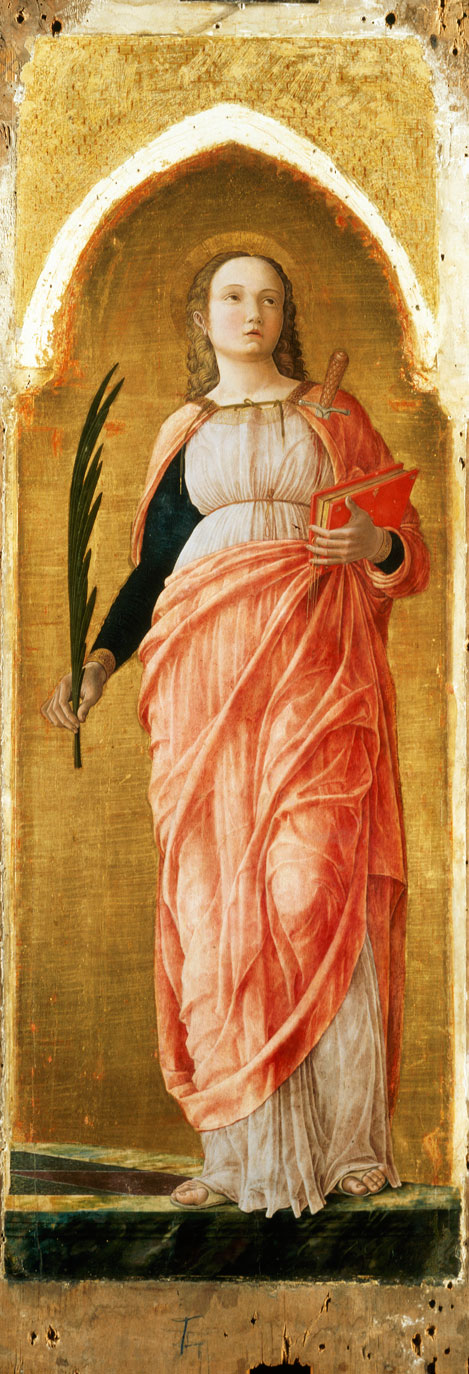
Saint Justina of Padua by Andrea Mantegna

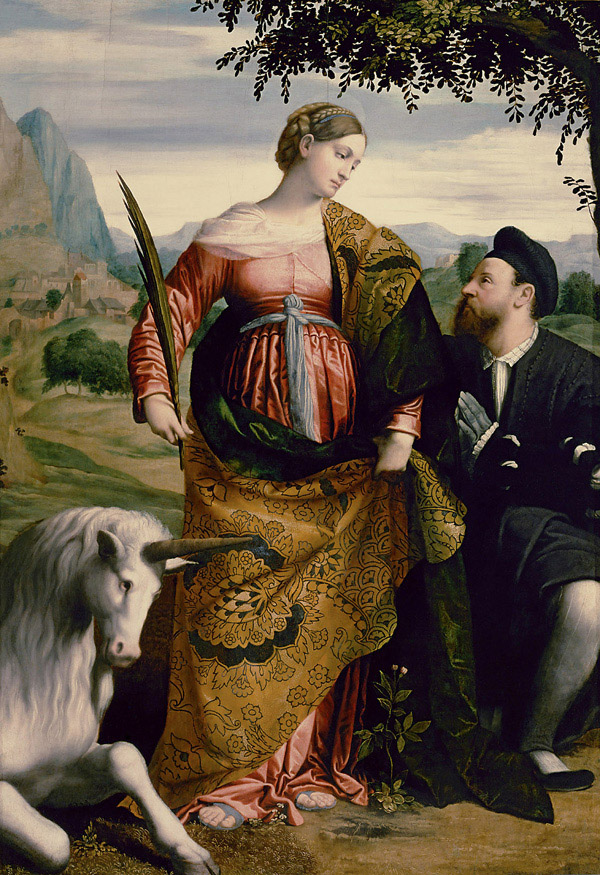
Saint Justina with the Unicorn, c. 1530, by Moretto da Brescia

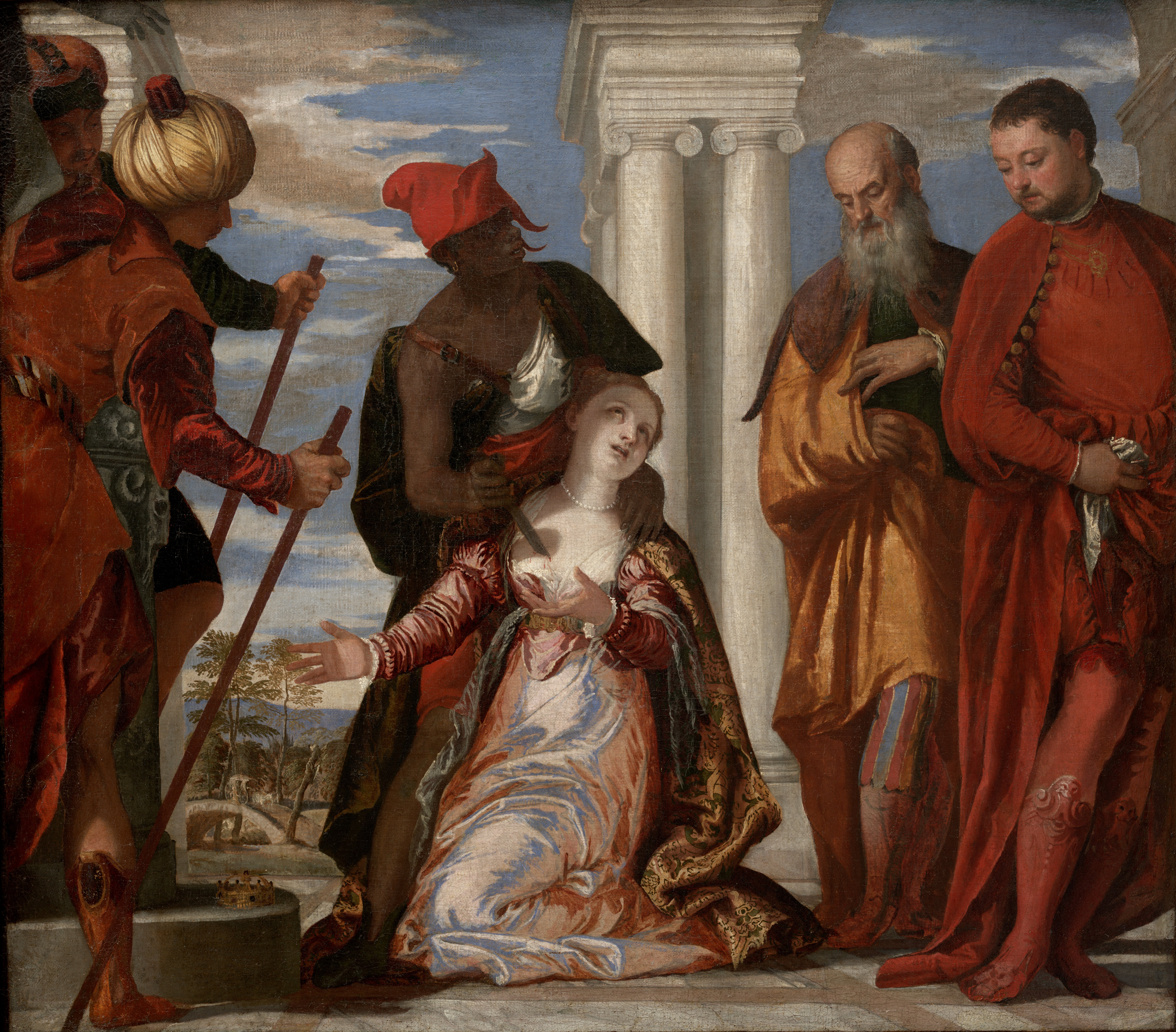
Paolo Veronese, The Martyrdom of Saint Justina

== See also ==
- Abbey of Santa Giustina
- Saint Justina of Padua, patron saint archive
