= Peter Stasiuk =

Canadian-Australian Ukrainian Greek Catholic bishop (1943–2025)

Peter Stasiuk C.Ss.R.
- Eparchial Bishop of Ukrainian Catholic Eparchy of Saints Peter and Paul of Melbourne
- Church: Ukrainian Greek Catholic Church
- Appointed: 16 December 1992
- Term ended: 15 January 2020
- Predecessor: Ivan Prasko
- Successor: Mykola Bychok
- Other post: Director of St. Vladimir's College in Roblin (1981–1993)

Orders
- Ordination: 2 Jul 1967 (Priest) by Maxim Hermaniuk
- Consecration: 9 Mar 1993 (Bishop) by Maxim Hermaniuk

Personal details
- Born: 16 July 1943 Roblin, Manitoba, Canada
- Died: 13 August 2025 (aged 82) Winnipeg, Manitoba, Canada

Peter Stasiuk, C.Ss.R. (Ukrainian: Петро Стасюк; 16 July 1943 – 13 August 2025) was an Australian Ukrainian Greek Catholic hierarch. He served as the second Eparchial Bishop of Ukrainian Catholic Eparchy of Saints Peter and Paul of Melbourne from 16 December 1992 until 15 January 2020.

== Biography ==
Stasiuk was born in Roblin, Manitoba, Canada, to a family of ethnic Ukrainian Greek-Catholics in Canada. After attending the Eastern Redemptorists' minor seminary, he joined the Congregation of the Most Holy Redeemer in 1960, where he made his profession on 28 August 1962 and his solemn profession on 28 August 1965. Stasiuk was ordained as a priest on 2 July 1967, after studies at the Saint Paul University in Ottawa, Canada. Then he continued his studies at another Canadian university, the University of Ottawa and in France at the François Rabelais University in Tours.

After returning from studies, he had various pastoral assignments and served as parish assistant, professor, superior and director at the Redemptorist Institutes in Canada. From 1981 until 1993 he was a rector of the Saint Vladimir's College.

On 16 December 1992, Fr. Stasiuk was nominated by Pope John Paul II and on 9 March 1993 consecrated to the Episcopate as the second eparchial bishop of the Ukrainian Catholic Eparchy of Saints Peter and Paul of Melbourne. The principal consecrator was Metropolitan Maxim Hermaniuk, the retired head of the Ukrainian Catholic Archeparchy of Winnipeg.

Stasiuk died at the Holy Family house in Winnipeg, Canada, on 13 August 2025, at the age of 82.

Catholic Church titles
Preceded by Ivan Prasko	Bishop of Saints Peter and Paul of Melbourne; 1992–2020	Succeeded by Mykola Bychok
