= Prosdocimus =

Christian saint and bishop of Padua, Italy

Saint Prosdocimus
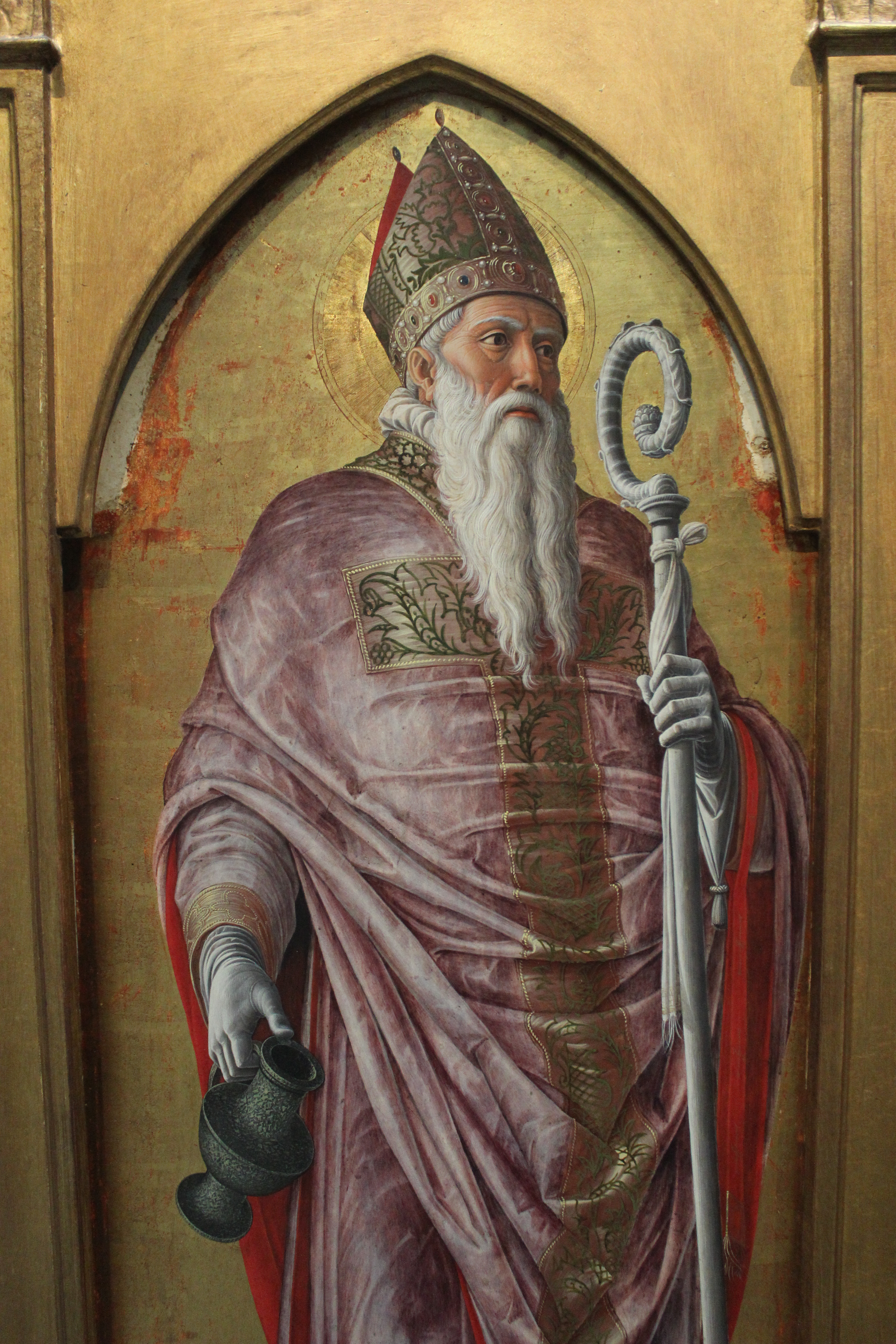
- Saint Prosdocimus
- Died: c. 100 AD
- Venerated in: Roman Catholic Church, Orthodox Church.
- Major shrine: Santa Giustina Basilica, Padua
- Feast: November 7
- Attributes: Depicted as a bishop holding a jar, referring to his baptizing Saint Justina of Padua.
- Patronage: Padua

Prosdocimus (Prosdecimus) of Padua (Italian: Prosdocimo, German: Prosdozimus) (d. November 7, ca. 100 AD) is venerated as the first bishop of Padua.

He evangelized the region and is said to have founded the parish church at Isola Vicentina. Prosdocimus baptized Justina of Padua.

His tomb is situated at the basilica of Santa Giustina at Padua. The chapel dedicated to him there was built over his tomb outside the walls of Padua. The church also once contained the relics of Prosdocimus's deacon, Daniel, though these were moved to the Paduan church of Santa Sofia in the 11th century, and then to Padua Cathedral.

== Iconography ==
He is generally depicted with a mitre and crosier, and sometimes with a can or ewer, referring to his baptism of St. Giustina.

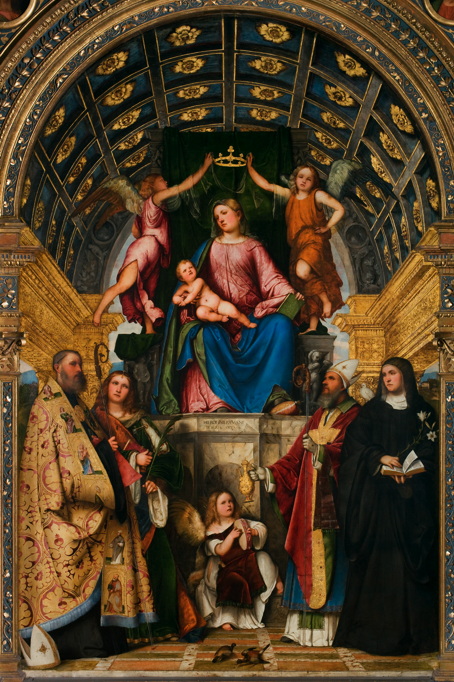
Pala Santa Giustina, Romanino

Tradition holds that, being of Greek origin, he was sent from Antioch by Peter the Apostle. He is thus often depicted in art with this apostle. The cathedral at Feltre is dedicated to him and Saint Peter the Apostle, and the artist Il Pordenone (c. 1483 - 1539) created a work depicting Prosdocimus with Peter.

There is a bronze statue of Prosdocimus (c. 1447) by Donatello in the Basilica of Saint Anthony of Padua in Padua.

Prosdocimus is depicted in an altarpiece by Romanino, now in the Musei Civici di Padova, Padua. He holds the jug a water with which he baptized Justina.

A drawing by Giovanni Battista Tiepolo of "St. Prosdocimus baptizing St. Giustina" is held by the National Gallery of Victoria. Pietro Damini painted an image of Saint Prosdocimus.
