= Society for the Promotion of Himalayan Indigenous Activities =

Society for the Promotion of Himalayan Indigenous Activities (SOPHIA)
- Founded: 1996
- Founder: Praveen Kaushal
- Type: non-profit organisation
- Purpose: Indigenous activities, forest rights
- Location: 76/33 Rajpur Rd., Lane No. 2, Saket Colony, Dehradun, Uttarakhand, India
- Region served: Uttar Pradesh, Uttarakhand, Himachal Pradesh
- Method: Rights-based approach, participatory self-diagnosis
- Key people: Van Gujjars
- Website: sophia.org.in

The Society for the Promotion of Himalayan Indigenous Activities (SOPHIA) is a non-profit organisation based in the state of Uttarakhand in India. SOPHIA's office is located in Dehradun, Uttarakhand, while its operational coverage extends through the states of Uttar Pradesh (UP), Uttarakhand (UK), and Himachal Pradesh (HP). The organisation works for indigenous communities to improve their living conditions and to facilitate the process of claiming forests rights through the 2006 Forest Rights Act. SOPHIA's director is Praveen Kaushal.

Since its founding, SOPHIA has particularly worked with the Muslim nomadic Van Gujjar community who dwell in the forest of the Western Himalayas and practice buffalo pastoralism. The Van Gujjars have since the early 1990s been subject to politics of forest conservation where the construction of Protected Areas, nobably Rajaji National Park and Govind Wildlife Sanctuary, has led to governmental actions for their forced displacement. SOPHIA has worked to advocate the claims of Van Gujjars and to help the Gujjar community access information through the Right to Information Act in this process.

== History ==
SOPHIA was registered as a Society in Uttarakhand in August 1996. The organisation was an offshoot of Rural Litigation and Entitlement Kendra (RLEK), a nongovernmental organization (NGO) that behan working for the Van Gujjar community but increasingly had turned to other issues. Consequently, SOPHIA was founded by staff from RLEK's former Van Gujjar Programme.

Since 1996 SOPHIA has run a milk marketing programme with the Van Gujjar community while advocating Van Gujjar issues in media and legal institutions. Between 2001 and 2004 SOPHIA ran a health programme in the Van Gujjar community. Addressing health and family planning issues served as a means for women's empowerment through the formation of women's groups. In these groups Gujjar women could also raise non-health related issues and set aside money for women-only loans.

After 2004 SOPHIA's focus has shifted to a rights-based approach focusing on domicile rights (including claiming the rights of Van Gujjars to vote in state and national elections), anti-corruption, and forest rights. SOPHIA's work is based on a Van Gujjar community "self-diagnosis process" in which the Gujjars formulate the priorities to be kept by SOPHIA.

== The Milk Programme ==
The Milk Programme is a market intervention project initiated by RLEK and taken over by SOPHIA in 1996. The programme has set up a collection point in Mohand, UP, where Van Gujjars deliver buffalo milk. The milk is then distributed in a van directly to consumers.

The programme was initiated to alleviate a set of economic difficulties emanating from the gradual transformation, beginning in the 1950s, of the milk-based economy of the Van Gujjars. Whereas the Van Gujjar economy had been based on bartering, the milk was increasingly incorporated in a monetised market. In this process, the Van Gujjar community was caught in a vicious circle of debt-induced dependency on milk middlemen who offered only a fraction of the selling price of milk to Van Gujjar producers.

By setting up facilities in Mohand, SOPHIA offers substantially lower prices for the milk than that of competing dairy traders. This forced an immediate price hike in the mid-1990s. In 1995, before the programme was initiated, Van Gujjars received Rs. 6.25 per litre. After the programme's initiation in 1996 prices rose to Rs. 9 per litre. As of 2012, one litre sells for Rs. 38 of which the Van Gujjar producers receive Rs. 36. Prices have steadily stayed ahead of general Indian inflation and all Van Gujjars are today free from debt-induced constraints.

== Forest rights claims ==
Since the enactment of the Scheduled Tribes and Other Traditional Forest Dwellers (Recognition of Forest Rights) Act, commonly referred to as the Forest Rights Act, in 2006 SOPHIA has assisted Himalayan indigenous communities, notably the Van Gujjars, to file forest rights claims. Many tribal community settlements are located on land owned by the Indian Forest Department which puts them under constant threats of eviction. The Forest Rights Act gives an opportunity for forest dwelling communities to hold legal rights to land and minor forest produce if they can prove, through documentation, that they have been residing in the area for at least three generations or 75 years. In this process SOPHIA works to capacitate the Van Gujjar community and settled populations in Saharanpur (UP), Dehradun (UK), and Uttarkashi (UK) districts to negotiate legal and regulatory pathways to securing forest rights.
