= Avdhash Kaushal =

Indian academic and social activist (died 2022)

- Born: 1934/1935
- Died: 12 July 2022; Dehradun, Uttarakhand, India
- Occupations: Academic, social activist

Avdhash Kaushal (1934/1935 – 12 July 2022) was an Indian academic, environmentalist and activist. He was awarded a Padma Shri in 1986.

== Early life ==
Avadesh Kaushal was born in Meerut.

== Career ==
Avdhash Kaushal was an Associate professor for 3 years in Lal Bahadur Shastri National Academy of Administration in Mussoorie.

He headed an NGO Rural Litigation and Entitlement Kendra (RLEK) which works, among others, to promote the cause of the Van Gujjars: an indigenous forest-dwelling nomadic tribe of the northern Himalayas. Campaigns include literacy, elementary health and veterinary care, and community forest management.

== Death ==
He died in Dehradun on 12 July 2022 at the age of 87.
