= Santa Sofia a Via Boccea =

Ukrainian Greek Catholic church in Rome

- Basilica of Holy Wisdom on the Via di Boccea
- Basilica di Santa Sofia a Via Boccea
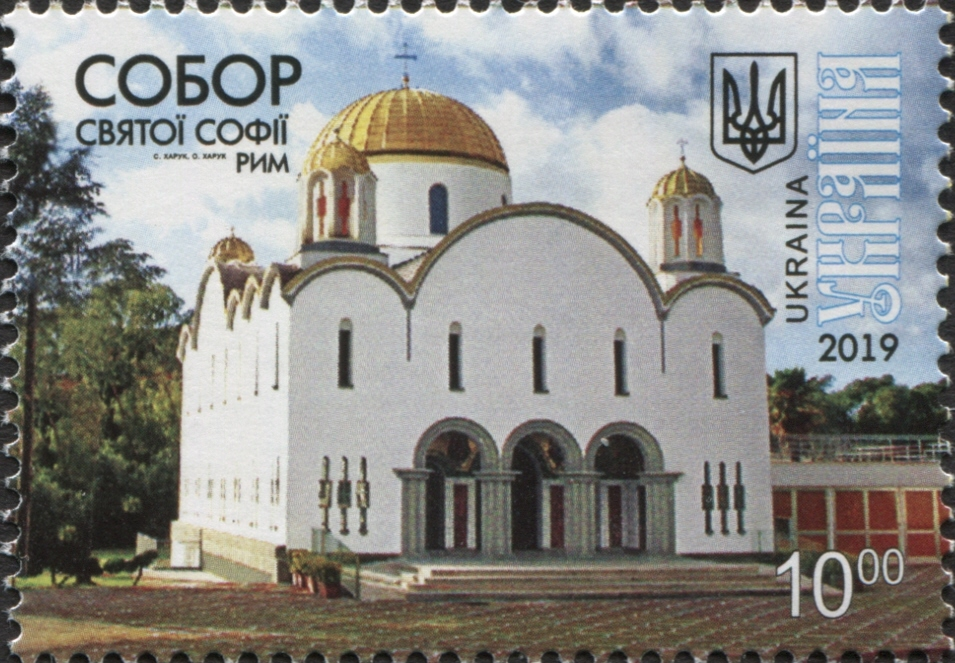
- Depiction on a Ukrainian stamp
- Click on the map for a fullscreen view
- 41°54′42″N 12°23′51″E
- Location: Via di Boccea 478, Rome
- Country: Italy
- Language: Ukrainian
- Denomination: Catholic Church
- Sui iuris church: Ukrainian Greek Catholic Church
- Tradition: Byzantine Rite

History
- Status: Minor basilica, titular church
- Founded: 1967
- Founder: Josyf Slipyj
- Dedication: Holy Wisdom

Architecture
- Architectural type: Byzantine Revival

Administration
- Diocese: Rome

Santa Sofia a Via Boccea (Ukrainian: Собор святої Софії, romanized: Sobor svyatoi Sofiy) is a church in Rome, Italy. It is dedicated to Holy Wisdom ("Sancta Sophia" in Latin), one of the seven gifts of the Holy Spirit. It served as the mother church of the Ukrainian Greek Catholic Church while St. George's Cathedral in Lviv was controlled by the Russian Orthodox Church.

== Description ==
The church is the national church for the Ukrainians in Rome, a meeting place and religious center for the community. The Divine Liturgy is celebrated according to the Byzantine-Ukrainian rite, whilst still in full communion with the Catholic Church.

The church was built in 1967–1968 on the orders of Cardinal Josyf Slipyj, the Major Archbishop of Lviv, who had spent about 18 years in a Soviet gulag, and upon his release was not allowed to return to Ukraine.

The building is modeled after Kyiv's Saint Sophia Cathedral. The relics of Pope Clement I (88-97) are kept in the church. Following the Byzantine rite, the church has an iconostasis, painted by Juvenalij Josyf Mokryckyj.

In 1985 Pope John Paul II erected the church as one of the titular churches suitable for a cardinal-priest.

In 1998 the church was raised to the status of a minor basilica.

== Cardinal Priest title ==
The first Cardinal-Priest of Santa Sofia was Myroslav Cardinal Lubachivsky. Lubomyr Cardinal Husar, MSU, Major Archbishop of Kyiv-Halych, held the titular church from his appointment as a cardinal on 21 February 2001 until his death in 2017. Cardinal Mykola Bychok, Eparch of Saints Peter and Paul of Melbourne, holds the current title.

- Myroslav Ivan Lubachivsky (25 May 1985 – 14 December 2000)
- Lubomyr Husar (21 February 2001 – 31 May 2017)
- Mykola Bychok (7 December 2024 – present)

== See also ==
- Santi Sergio e Bacco

Preceded by San Sisto Vecchio	Landmarks of Rome; Santa Sofia a Via Boccea	Succeeded by Santo Stefano al Monte Celio
