= Saint Sophia Church (Nakhchivan-on-Don) =

Former church in Rostov, Russia

Coordinates: 47.1347°N 39.4457°E

The Church of the Holy Wisdom of God
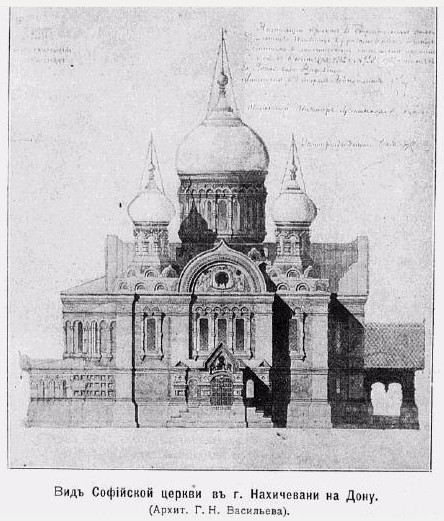

Religion
- Affiliation: Russian Orthodox

Location
- Location: Nakhichivan-on-Don, Rostov Oblast, Russia
- Interactive map of The Church of the Holy Wisdom of God

Architecture
- Architect: V. V. Popov
- Completed: 1912
- Demolished: 1934

The Church of the Holy Wisdom of God or Saint Sophia Church (Russian: Церковь Софии Премудрости Божией) ― was a Russian Orthodox church in Nakhchivan-on-Don (which currently form a part of Rostov-on-Don city) Rostov Oblast, Russia.

== History ==
Nakhichevan-on-Don was originally formed by Armenian settlers, but since the town was close to Rostov-on-Don, where the Russian population was predominant, Nakhichevan could not remain a mononational Armenian city for a long time.

St. Sophia Church was built in 1863 in Pervomayskaya Street.

In 1904, instead of the wooden Sofia Church, the construction of a stone church designed by architect V. V. Popov began and was completed in 1912.

This church did not last for a quarter of a century. In 1934 it was closed and dismantled for building materials. At first, all the side domes and walls were removed, although the central dome had rested for some more time on four columns. In the end, these columns were also blown up. Next to the place of the former St. Sophia Church, the building of School No. 11 was constructed.

In the last years of the church's existence, the future Georgian Metropolitan Zinovy (Mazhuga) served there.
