= Mykola Bychok =

Ukrainian Greek Catholic prelate and cardinal

His Eminence Mykola Bychok C.Ss.R.
- Cardinal; Bishop of the Ukrainian Catholic Eparchy of Saints Peter and Paul of Melbourne
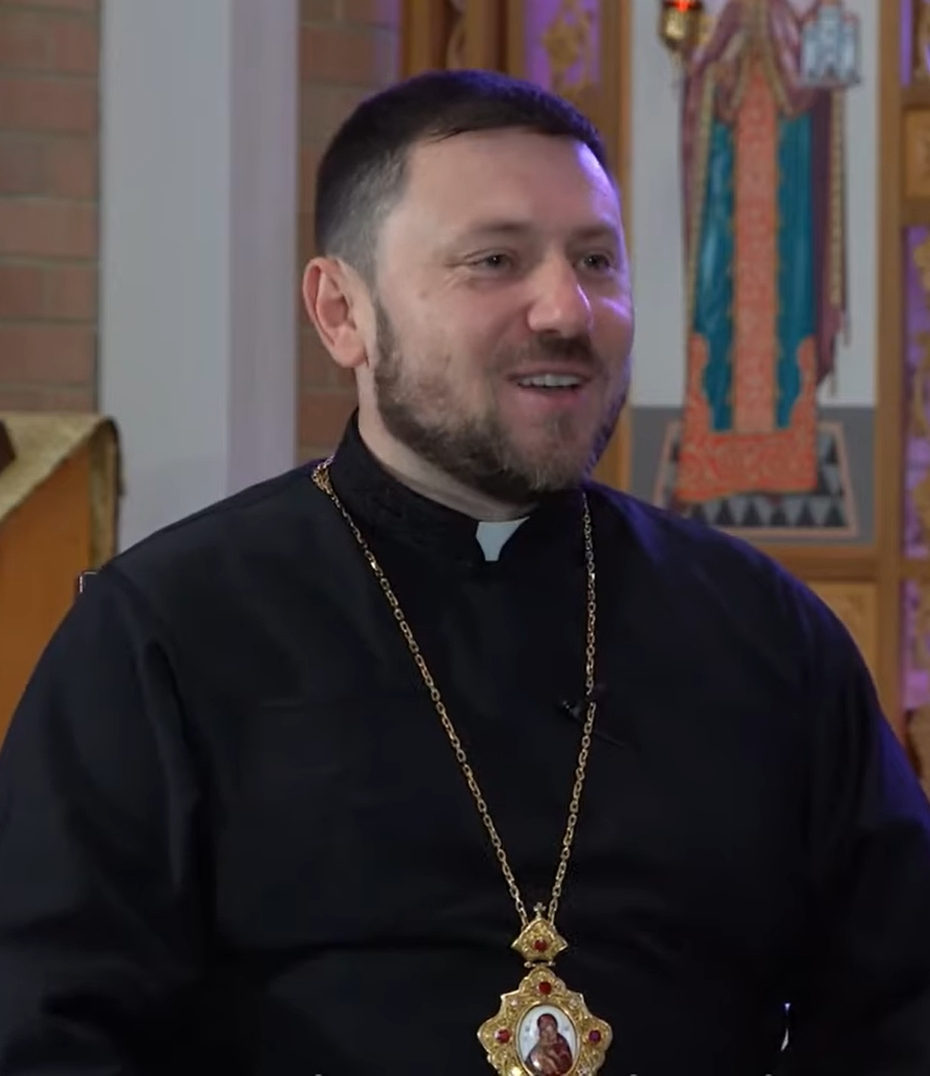
- Bychok in October 2024
- Church: Ukrainian Greek Catholic Church
- Appointed: 15 January 2020
- Predecessor: Peter Stasiuk, C.Ss.R.
- Other post: Cardinal-Priest of Santa Sofia a Via Boccea (2024–)

Orders
- Ordination: 3 May 2005 by Ihor Vozniak
- Consecration: 7 June 2020 by Sviatoslav Shevchuk
- Created cardinal: 7 December 2024 by Pope Francis
- Rank: Cardinal-Priest

Personal details
- Born: Mykola Petrovych Bychok; 13 February 1980 (age 46) Ternopil, Ukrainian SSR, Soviet Union
- Motto: Пресвятая Богородице, спаси нас (Most Holy Mother of God, save us)
- Coat of arms

Mykola Bychok, C.Ss.R. (Ukrainian: Микола Бичок; born 13 February 1980) is a Ukrainian Greek Catholic (Note: The Ukrainian Greek Catholic Church "shares the full communion with Rome, although it adheres to the Byzantine rite, with a liturgy more similar to that of Orthodox Christians and a married clergy.") prelate who has served as Eparch of Saints Peter and Paul of Melbourne, Australia since 2020. Pope Francis made him a cardinal on 7 December 2024, making him the youngest member of the College of Cardinals and youngest elector in the 2025 papal conclave. He is a member of the Redemptorists.

== Biography ==
Bychok was born in Ternopil in western Ukraine in 1980. He joined the Congregation of the Most Holy Redeemer, popularly known as the Redemptorists, in July 1997. His religious training took place in Ukraine and Poland, where he obtained a licentiate in pastoral theology. On 17 August 2003, Bychok took his religious vows, and on 3 May 2005 he was ordained a priest in the Ukrainian Catholic Archeparchy of Lviv.

Following his ordination, Bychok spent time as a missionary at the Mother of Perpetual Help Church in Prokopyevsk, Russia. He later served as the superior of Saint Joseph's Redemptorists Monastery and pastor of the Mother Parish of Perpetual Help in Ivano-Frankivsk, Ukraine. From 2015 to 2020 Bychok served as the vicar of the Ukrainian Catholic parish of Saint John the Baptist in Newark, New Jersey, US, part of the Archieparchy of Philadelphia of the Ukrainians.

Coat of arms as bishop

On 15 January 2020, he was appointed by Pope Francis as the eparchial bishop of the Ukrainian Catholic Eparchy of Saints Peter and Paul of Melbourne, succeeding Peter Stasiuk. The eparchy's jurisdiction comprises Australia, New Zealand, and Oceania.

On 7 June 2020, the feast of Pentecost in the Julian calendar used by the Ukrainian Greek Catholic Church at the time, he was consecrated as bishop by Major Archbishop Sviatoslav Shevchuk and other hierarchs of the Ukrainian Greek Catholic Church in St. George's Cathedral, Lviv.

On 6 October 2024, Pope Francis announced that he planned to make Bychok a cardinal; on 7 December 2024 he was made a cardinal priest, of Santa Sofia a Via Boccea. In place of the red biretta given to new cardinals of the Latin rite, Francis placed a black koukoulion with a red trim, the typical Ukrainian monastic headdress, on Bychok's head. Bychok became the youngest member of the College of Cardinals, (Note: Giorgio Marengo, more than five and a half years older than Bychok, was previously the youngest cardinal.) the seventh cardinal from the Ukrainian Greek Catholic Church, (Note: Including Isidore of Kiev.) and the third cardinal from the Ternopil region.

A cardinal elector at the 2025 papal conclave, and Australia's sole representative, he lightly joked afterwards that being shut off from the world for an extended time was the highlight of his life: "Just try … try to turn off your phone at least for 24 hours – my phone was turned off for two and a half days" –and nothing like the film Conclave, which he said did not depict prayer.

== Honours ==
- Sovereign Military Order of Malta: Bailiff Grand Cross of Honour and Devotion of the Order of Saint John

== See also ==
- Cardinals created by Pope Francis

== Notes ==
Catholic Church titles
Preceded by Peter Stasiuk	Bishop of the Ukrainian Catholic Eparchy of Saints Peter and Paul of Melbourne; 7 June 2020 – present	Incumbent
Preceded by Lubomyr Husar	Cardinal Priest of Santa Sofia a Via Boccea; 7 December 2024 – present	Incumbent
