= Ayasofya Mosque =

Ayasofya Mosque may refer to:

- Hagia Sophia in Fatih, Istanbul, Turkey, first a church, then a mosque, then a museum, now again a mosque.
- Little Hagia Sophia, in Istanbul, Turkey, a former church converted into a mosque.
- Hagia Sophia, İznik, Turkey, first a church, then a mosque, then a museum, now again a mosque.
- Selimiye Mosque, Nicosia, North Cyprus, first a church, now a Mosque.
- Saint Sophia Church, Sofia, Bulgaria, first a church, then a mosque, now again a church.
- Hagia Sophia, Thessaloniki, Greece, first a church, then a mosque, now again a church.
- Hagia Sophia, Mystras, Greece, first a church, then a mosque, now again a church.
- Hagia Sophia, Trabzon, Turkey, first a church, then a mosque, then a museum, now again a mosque.
