= Rural Litigation and Entitlement Kendra =

Rural Litigation and Entitlement Kendra (RLEK) is a non-governmental organisation based in the state of Uttarakhand, India, with an office located in Dehradun. The organisation was established as a result of years of struggle against atrocities meted out to underprivileged and marginalised communities in the region.

RLEK has fought in the courts of justice for communities as well as individuals. Some of the decisions by courts in these cases have forced the government to pass new laws. RLEK works to bring about nationwide exposure of widespread violations of fundamental rights. RLEK initiatives and lobbying have resulted in several laws, such as: the Bonded Labour Abolition Act, 1976; the Narcotics and Psychotropic Substances (NDPS) Act, 1988; and the Environment Protection Act, 1986.

The organisation works on the aim: "To reach the unreached and include the excluded." The vision of the organisation is to achieve a just and sustainable society. The Kendra is driven by the mission to empower indigenous groups, marginalised populations and women and children. The organisation is registered under the Societies Registration Act, 1860 since 1989. The Kendra was headed by Avdhash Kaushal. RLEK has over 150 full-time and part-time staff and 100 volunteers.

== History ==
In the late 1970s, a group of young people undertook development work amongst the tribal communities in the area of Jaunsar-Bawar in Dehradun district. This led to the beginning of the Kendra. Many tribal communities in this region had been deprived of their legal and fundamental rights due to the prevalent systemic inequities and injustices. The group focused on empowerment and liberation of bonded labour, with special focus on women.

RLEK has played a significant role in advocating for the rights of local communities and promoting sustainable development in the region. The organization has been involved in several landmark cases, including the 'Bhagirathi eco-sensitive zone' case, where RLEK's efforts led to the creation of a protected zone aimed at preserving the natural habitat of the region.

== Objectives ==
The aim of RLEK is to ensure that marginalized communities have access to justice and are able to assert their rights, and to promote sustainable development that respects the environment and the needs of local communities. The main objectives of RLEK are:

- To work on the economic and social problems of the poor and unprivileged, particularly women, by organizing them into community-based groups.
- To empower women and build capacities by providing information and knowledge regarding local self governance.
- To mobilize women through training, networking and by providing institutional support, to contest elections and about gender equity in local self-governance.
- To provide education to tribal, nomads and other marginalized sections through formal and innovative non-formal programs.
- To increase awareness on environmental issues and to work for environmental conservation.
- To provide participation of forest dependent communities in conservation and sustainable forest management strategies.
- To sensitize, raise the level of awareness of legal rights among the poor, and create a cadre of Para-legal workers.
- To establish a culture of humanism through promotion of social justice and to secure entitlements for deprived section of society through public interest litigation and advocacy.

== Milestones ==
=== Limestone Quarrying ===
RLEK fought a case against the Uttar Pradesh government protesting against limestone mining in the Doon Valley. This case was the first environmental case in the country to be heard by the Supreme Court of India. Writ Petition no. 8209, filed by RLEK, was the first public interest litigation in the country which involved issues related to environmental and ecological balance.

Limestone mining operations in the Doon Valley had become extensive between 1955 and 1965. The ravages of the uncontrolled mining began to be felt in the decade that followed 1965. Mining and deforestation had wreaked havoc with the local conditions. By the early 1980s, the valley was prone to landslides due to the absence of bushes that once held the soil together. In addition, water shortage was a consequence of the deficiency of the numerous water streams that once emanated from the limestone aquifers.

The case was fought for five years. The final judgment was given against the limestone contractors and industrialists on 30 August 1988 and ordered the closing down of the 101 mines in the valley. This was followed by an afforestation program, which was carried out with the help of local and outstation volunteers.

=== Right to Breathe ===
The cement factories in Dehradun were causing high levels of toxic emissions due to their activities. This was harming the health of the people as well as the ecological balance. The factories continued their operation despite being prohibited by the U. P. Pollution Control Board due to their failure to comply with the pollution Control Rules. RLEK went through the lower courts to the apex court demanding a closure of the factories as their activities were violating the Fundamental Rights of the people under Articles 19 and 21 of the Constitution of India. The court ordered the closing down of these activities.

=== Freeing Bonded Labourers ===
The Government of India passed the Abolition of Bonded Labour Act in 1976. However, many people were deprived of the freedom due to lack of awareness and inaccessibility. The Kotlas of Jaunsar Bawar were one of these deprived people who were victims of bonded labour. RLEK made an initiative to free the people, accompanied by volunteers.

Volunteers spread the awareness of laws through printed and oral media. RLEK then made an attempt at getting the land ownership rights of the freed labourers by bringing to the notice of the Supreme Court instances of such denial of rights. The Supreme Court ordered the State Government to facilitate the allotment of land to the freed labourers.

=== Illegal Poppy Cultivation ===
There was a rampant practice of opium poppy cultivation in the tribal areas of Dehradun. The poor indigenous people were forced to cultivate poppy by the rich beneficiaries. The poppy cultivated was used for narcotics consumption as well as supply to the national and international markets. This affected the local people as well in the form of drug addiction. Social problems resulted due to drug addiction among the people, especially the youth. RLEK fought in the court, advocating the rights of these people, which led to the passing of "Prevention of Illicit Traffic in Narcotic Drugs and Psychotropic Substances Act" in the year 1988. Due to the fines and punishments imposed by this Act, poppy cultivation has stopped in the area.

=== UP Rural Water and Environment Sanitation Project ===
In order to raise the living and health standards of twelve communities, RLEK worked with them under the Uttar Pradesh Rural Water Supply and Environment Sanitation.

== Ongoing initiatives ==
RLEK has been working with the Van (Forest) Gujjars in order to preserve their lifestyle and to help them during transhumance. The Kendra is imparting adult education to empower the Van Gujjars. This step is drawn on the founder’s observation that no child remains uneducated if the parents are educated. Official sanction remains to be obtained for the community forest management plan (CFM), some parts of which have been implemented, aimed at increasing local control of natural resources. RLEK has been awarded with UNESCO-NLM award, 1998 and Rotary Awards for service to humanity (India) trust for the adult education program. Due to their migratory nature, Van Gujjars are residents of Himachal Pradesh and Uttarakhand. They are denied of their universal suffrage as they are recognized by neither state. RLEK lobbied and aided in including lacs of nomads in the electoral mainstream. RLEK is helping the Van Gujjars by organizing a milk cooperative SOPHIA in order to free them from the clutches of exploitative middlemen. The organization is also providing veterinary health care to the livestock of the community.

== Sister Concerns ==
=== Pragati ===
Panchayati Rule and Gender Awareness Training Institute aims to attain gender equity. The institute strives to enhance the social, political and economic status of women by changing the nature and direction of the systematic forces that marginalize women and other disadvantaged groups.

Objectives

- To raise women’s consciousness of political rights guaranteed in the 73rd and 74th constitutional amendments.
- To raise women’s knowledge and awareness of their general rights with respect to social, economic and political institution, health, nutrition, education, population, reproductive health, the law and the world around them.
- To develop leadership skills for taking up responsibilities in social spheres.
- To bring a change in self-image from one of subordination and subjugation to that of self-esteem, confidence and equality.
- To encourage the formation of cohesive, articulate women’s collectives at the village/neighborhood level, that can take up their own struggle on shared issues and problems.
- To encourage women to collectively address various forms of gender injustice through open forum ‘interface’ meetings.
- To lobby for policy-level changes for ensuring women’s right, including right to inheritance, right to ownership of property, right to maintenance in the event of divorce and desertion.
- To encourage women to independently analyze, critique and reach out to information and knowledge as an empowerment process.

=== Prakriya ===
It aims at community empowerment for sustainable development.

=== Human Right Centre ===
It was inaugurated in October 1999 by the then chairperson of the National Human Rights Commission of India, Justice M. N. Venkatachaliah. The Centre aims at steering the "human rights culture" so as to develop a just society. It also offers a Post Graduate Diploma course in Human Rights.

=== Jan Shikshan Sansthan ===
JSS aims to remove illiteracy by providing education to people in the age group of 15-35. These Sansthans have been established throughout the country. Ministry of Human Resource Development, Government of India had delegated the establishment of JSS in Bageshwar to RLEK. JSS provides technical knowledge and occupational skills to neo-literates of the region, especially to the socio-economically backward groups. The Sansthan also organizes Life enrichment Education Programme like disaster management, health and hygiene etc.
