= Paolo del Sera =

Paolo del Sera (1617 – 22 September 1672) was a Florentine artist and art connoisseur of Venetian art who is best known for his correspondence with Leopoldo de 'Medici. He is said to have trained under Domenico Passignano and in Venice under Tiberio Tinelli, and respected as a portrait painter.

== See also ==
- Annunciation (Veronese, Uffizi)
- Madonna and Child with Two Donors (Getty Museum)
