= Sophienkirche (disambiguation) =

Sophienkirche was a church in Dresden, Germany.

Sophienkirche may also refer to:

- Sophienkirche, Bayreuth or Ordenskirche St. Georgen, a church in Bayreuth, Germany
- Sophienkirche, Berlin, a church in Berlin, Germany

== See also ==
- Saint Sophia Church (disambiguation)
