= Zygris =

Zygris Zygritanus
- Location in Egypt
- Coordinates: 31°12′N 27°55′E
- Country: Egypt
- Elevation: 2 m (6.6 ft)
- Time zone: UTC+2 (EST)

Zygris (Greek: Ζυγρίς; the inhabitants were called Zygritae, Ζυγρῖται) was a small town in the Roman province of Marmarica, a province also known as Libya Inferior. It was in the eastern part of this region, which some geographers considered a separate area, called Libycus Nomus, distinct from both Marmarica and Aegyptus. It may have been located at Zaviet-El-Chammas in modern Egypt. Diderot's Encyclopedia gave Solonet as its modern name.

Ptolemy describes it as only a village.

An ancient guide for sailing, the Stadiasmus Maris Magni, says that there was at Zygris an islet at which it was possible to put in and find water on the shore.

== Bishopric ==
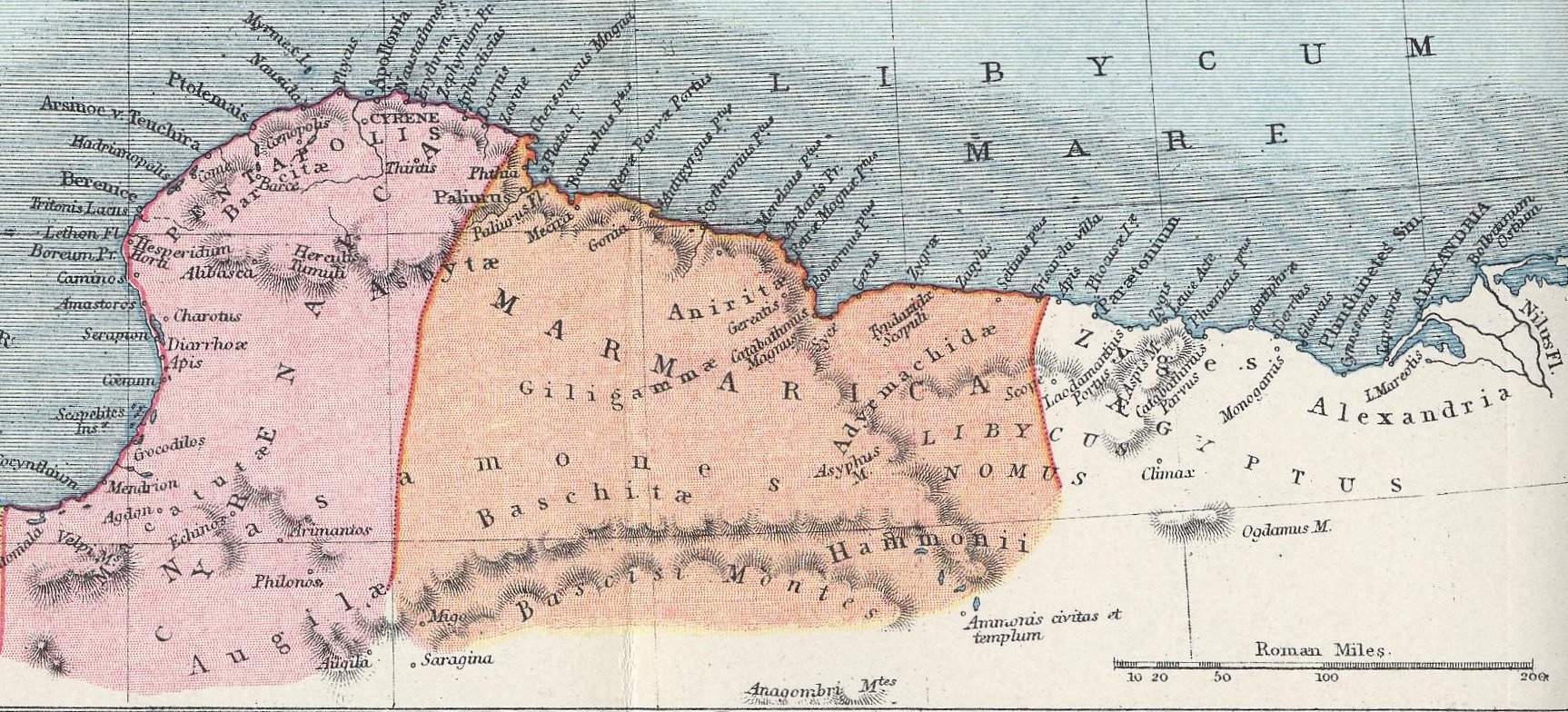
Map of Cyrenaica and Marmarica in the Roman era Showing Zygris. (Samuel Butler, 1907)

Although Zygris was only a village, it had its own bishop from an early date.

The bishopric was a suffragan of the metropolitan see of Darnis, the capital of the Roman province. However, the extraprovincial authority exercised by the bishop of Alexandria over not only Egypt but also Libya (as was recognized at the First Council of Nicaea) meant that Zygris was also directly subject to the see of Alexandria.

Marcus, bishop of Zygris, attended a synod convoked by Athanasius of Alexandria in 362 under Julian the Apostate. Lucius took part in the Robber Council of Ephesus in 349, a record of which was read at the Council of Chalcedon in 451.

No longer a residential bishopric, Zygris is today listed by the Catholic Church as a titular see.
