= Santa Sofia, Padua =

Roman Catholic church structure in Padua, Veneto, Italy

Coordinates: 45.4073°N 11.8848°E

Santa Sofia
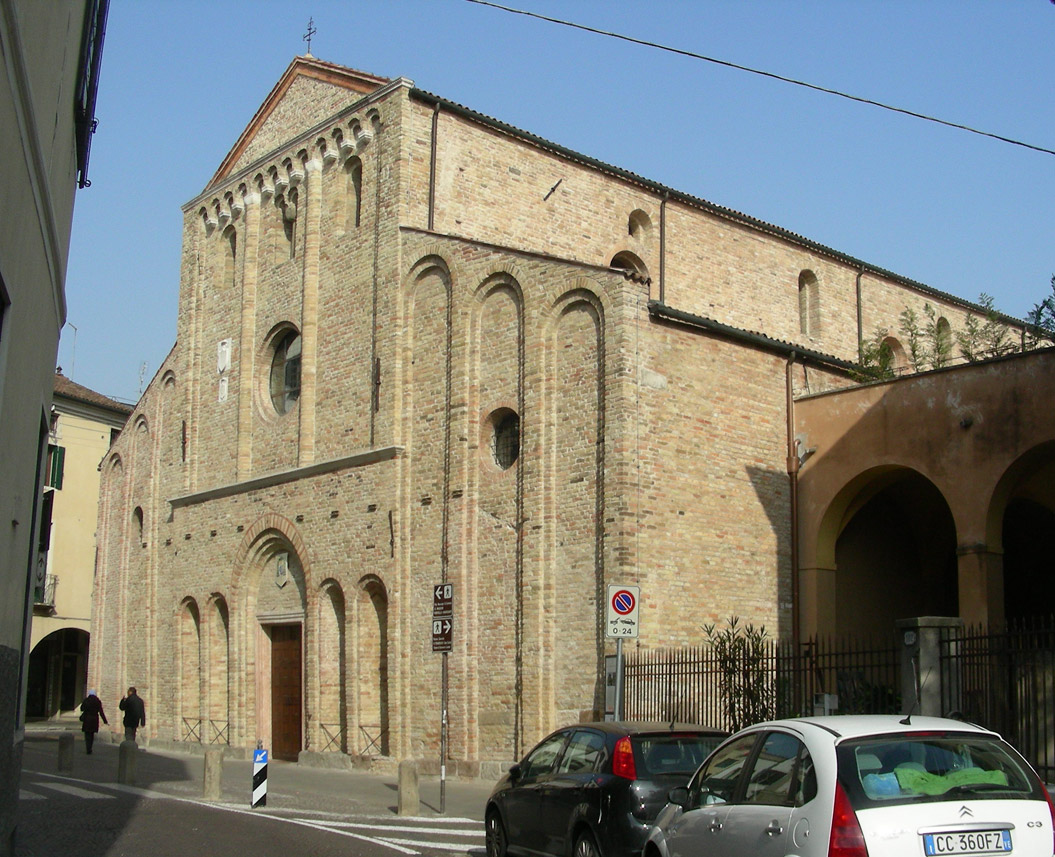
- Facade

Religion
- Affiliation: Roman Catholic
- Diocese: Padua
- Rite: Roman Catholic, Western rite

Location
- Location: Italy
- Interactive map of Santa Sofia

Architecture
- Type: Church
- Style: Romanesque facade
- Groundbreaking: 10th Century
- Completed: 1127

Santa Sofia is the oldest Roman Catholic church structure in the city of Padua, region of Veneto, Italy. It was built in the 10th century on the site of a presumed Mithraeum. A grant was made to bishop Sinibaldo of this church in 1123, which had already been in construction. The Romanesque stone and brick facade was constructed from 1106 to 1127, but the semicircular apse may date from earlier. The interior is now relatively bare.

== History ==
Tradition is that the church was founded by St. Prosdocimus on the ruins of a temple dedicated to Apollo. The first document in which is mentioned the church is dated February 19, 1123: the bishop Sinibaldo of Padua intervened to urge the completion work of the church, which had started at least from 1109, and had suffered from the earthquake of 1117.

Numerous archaeological finds from the site date to between the second and fourth centuries). The apse is suspected to date to the 9th century, during the Carolingian age, based on the crypt, which is within 50 years as the nave of the Basilica of San Marco, using radiocarbon methods Primary construction of the present apse was between 1070 and 1106. The second phase opened in 1117 and ended in about 1170. The structure underwent embellishment near the end of the fourteenth century to meet the liturgical reforms approved by the Council of Trent. A seventeen-year-old Andrea Mantegna painted his first independent work for this church, an altarpiece depicting Madonna with Child in conversation with saints. It was dismembered in the seventeenth century.

Initially operated by Augustinian monks, the church was granted to Benedictine nuns by 1517. In the sixteenth century it was a parish church. It became a provostry, which depended the church of San Gaetano, the church of Paolotti, Matthias Church and the church of San Biagio. The nuns were expelled during the Napoleonic rule of Veneto in 1806–1810, and the convent became state ownership.

Between 1951 and 1958, the structure underwent a major restoration work aiming to restore primitive appearance of the church. This effort stripped the church of the Mannerist and Baroque accretions, but has left the church interior much less decorated. Recently the nave was again subject to important conservation work and cleaning the walls The church has returned to become a parish church governed by secular clergy of the diocese of Padua. Until 1957, the church had the incorruptible bodies of the Blessed Beatrice I Este (from 1578) and of the blessed Elena Enselmini, this last was moved here from the church of the Blessed Elena in 1810.

== Exterior ==
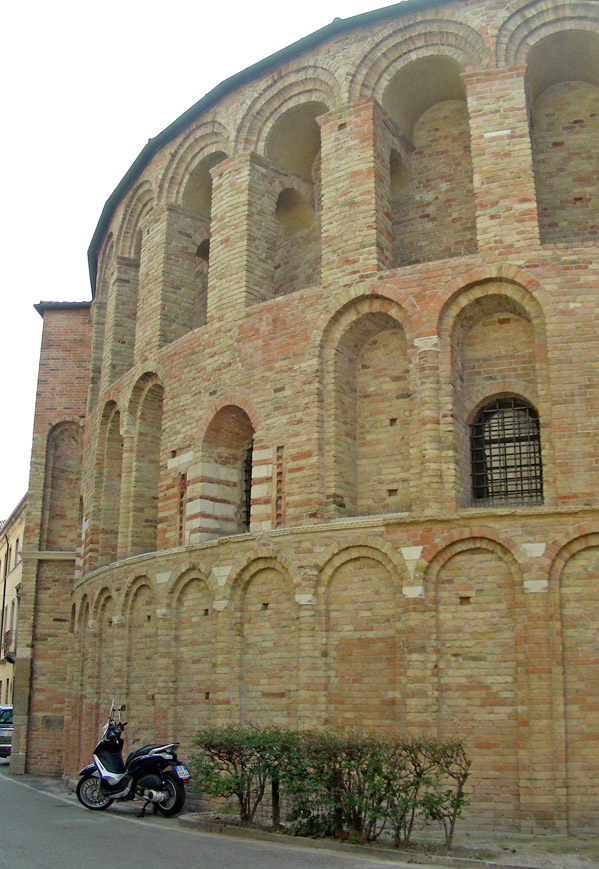
Santa Sofia, apse (particular), 10th ct.

The church, as typical for Romanesque churches, is oriented with an apse to the east and facade facing west.

The north range of the upper part of the facade has sunken, due to a failure of the foundation took place around the time of construction. Characterized by niches, blind arcades and hanging arches, it is linked perhaps to the construction site of Torcello and is dated to the first half of the twelfth century. Within certain niches, on the north, there are visible fragments of frescoes of the fourteenth century. The mullioned window at the top is from the twentieth-century restoration while the large oculus is fourteenth century, the result of Bishop Stephen from Carrara to adorn the structure. Along the aisles, simple and unadorned openings from various periods: single and double windows of Romanesque, Gothic and an oculi windows from the sixteenth. The Palladian windows open in the seventeenth century were buffered in the nineteenth century.

The early medieval apse, with a blind arches, a gallery, and a large central niche, was reconstructed in 1852. Some scholars have seen in part of a round unfinished, other similarities with the construction of Santa Maria and Donato in Murano. The Romanesque bell tower Gothic, dated 1296, stands adjacent to the apse.

== Interior ==
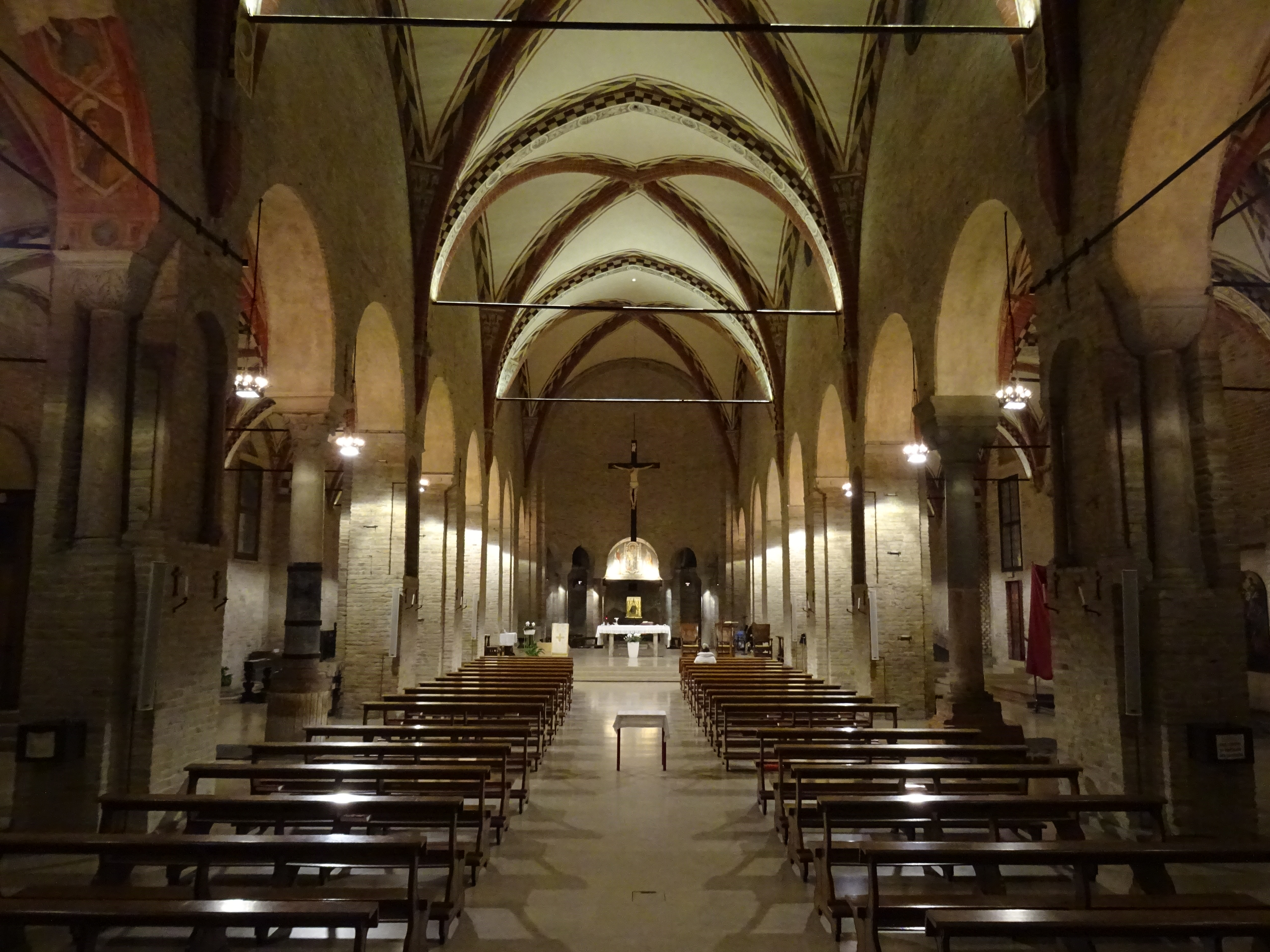
Interior of Santa Sofia (looking east)

The impressive interior is the result of major restoration in the 1950s. It returned the building to a severe appearance and with harmonious embellishments previously distorted by the sixteenth and seventeenth centuries. The pillars and columns support the many arches that lead to the apse. The plastered roof vaults date from the late fourteenth century renovation of Bishop Stephen from Carrara. The aisles end in a sort of ambulatory, interrupted by the large niche at the top of the apse, where the tabernacle was placed.

The columns and capitals alternate with pillars and stone decorations came from a Roman and Byzantine landfill. Along the walls are thirteenth and fourteenth-century frescoes, from the school of Giotto. Entering on the left there is a small lapidary. It follows the altar of the Blessed Beatrice D'Este. The altar below shows a shovel with St. Francis of Paola and her miracles, from the church of the Vincentians. Opposite, on the left aisle, altar with very valuable Pietà of Egidio from Wiener Neustadt on the vaults are continuing with Gothic frescoes. Then, holy water font made from an old imperial capital unfinished.

The complex apse is surrounded by niches-seat converging to central niche that bears, on the arch, a fourteenth-century fresco with the Virgin Enthroned with Saints. Hanging over the basin, a fifteenth-century wooden crucifix. Under the presbytery lies the crypt, unfinished. On the opposite there is the tomb of Ludovico Cortusio.

== Miscellaneous ==
- Ludovico Cortusio, writer.
- The church preserves the baptismal font used to baptize Livia and Gianvincenzo, sons of Galileo Galilei. It was originally in the church of Santa Caterina.

== Sources ==
- Giovambattista Rossetti, description of paintings, sculptures, and architecture of Padova in Padua MDCCLXXX Printing Seminary
- Giannantonio Moschini, Guide for the city of Padua, Atesa.
- AA.VV., Padua basilicas and churches, Blacks Pozza Ed., Vicenza 1975.
- Joseph Toff, The streets of Padua, Newton Compton Ed., Rome 1999, ISBN 9788882890247.
- Joseph Toff, hundred churches Padua disappeared, Editorial Program.
- AA.VV., Padua, Medoacus

== Sources ==
- Short entry from Padua Tourist Agency
