= Saint Sophia Cathedral (Washington, D.C.) =

Greek Orthodox cathedral in Washington, D.C.

Coordinates: 38°55′38.78″N 77°4′13.00″W

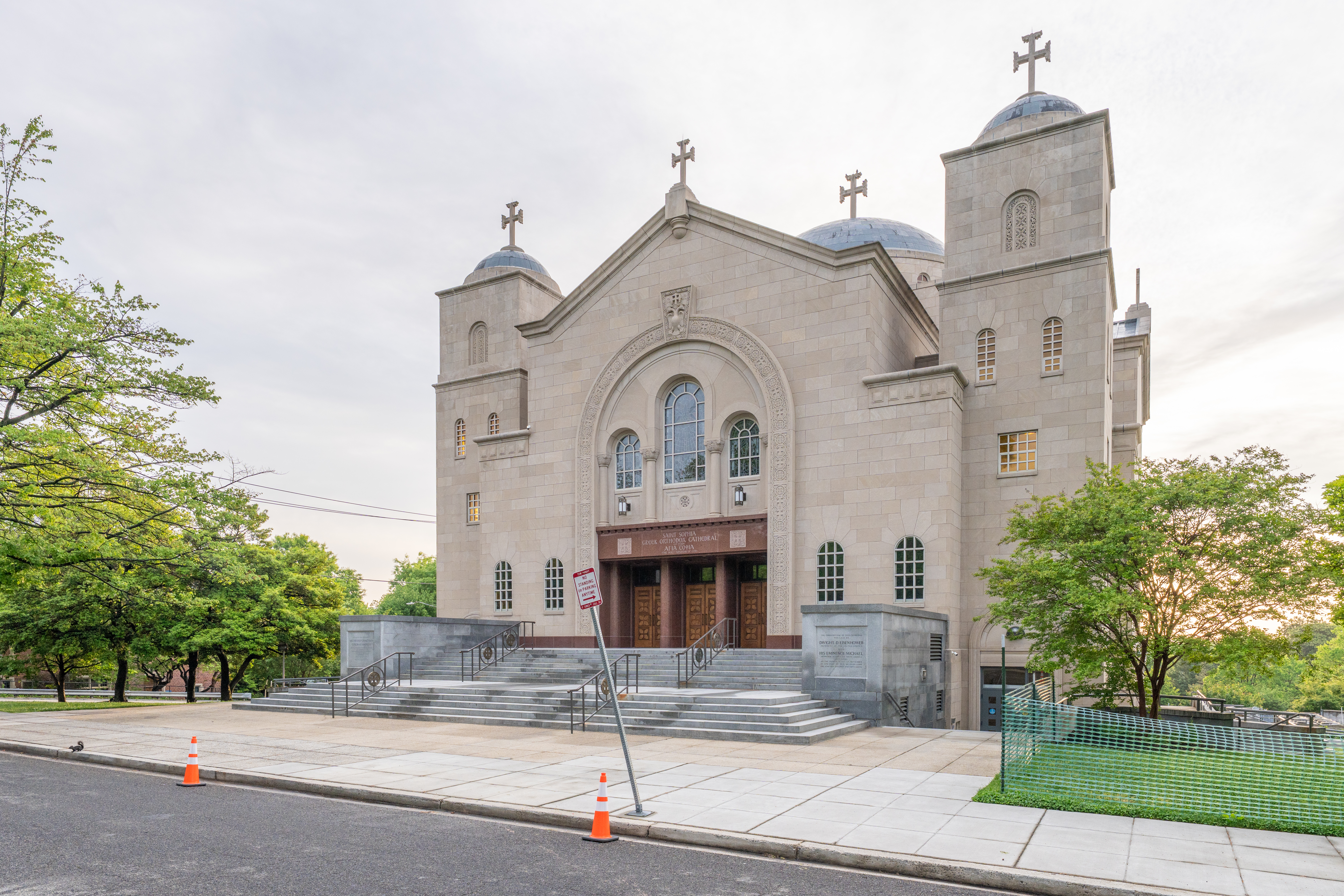

Religion
- Affiliation: Greek Orthodox Church
- Year consecrated: 2015
- Status: Active

Location
- Location: Washington, D.C.
- State: District of Columbia
- Interactive map of Saint Sophia Cathedral

Architecture
- Type: Cathedral
- Style: Neo-Byzantine
- Groundbreaking: 1951

Specifications
- Dome height (outer): 80 ft (24 m)
- Materials: Limestone

Website
- saintsophiadc.org

Saint Sophia Greek Orthodox Cathedral was founded as a church in 1904 to serve the Greek Orthodox residents of the District of Columbia. In 1962, the church was elevated to a cathedral under the jurisdiction of the Archbishop of America in New York City and serves as his cathedral in Washington. The church is not named for Saint Sophia the martyr, but rather the Holy Wisdom of God in the tradition of Hagia Sophia of Constantinople. The building is in the Neo-Byzantine style with a central dome that reaches 80 ft (24 m) in height.

The congregation met in temporary quarters for several years, prior to the construction of its own church near 8th and L Streets NW which was dedicated in 1924. This site is currently occupied by the Walter E. Washington Convention Center. Construction on the current edifice at 2815 36th Street NW, near Massachusetts Avenue and a short distance from the Washington National Cathedral, began in 1951. The congregation began worshipping there in 1955 shortly after major construction was completed. Although the building has been in use for over fifty years, the interior decoration is incomplete. Work began on the interior in 1965 and continues to the present. The cathedral was Consecrated in May 2015 by Archbishop Demetrios of America.

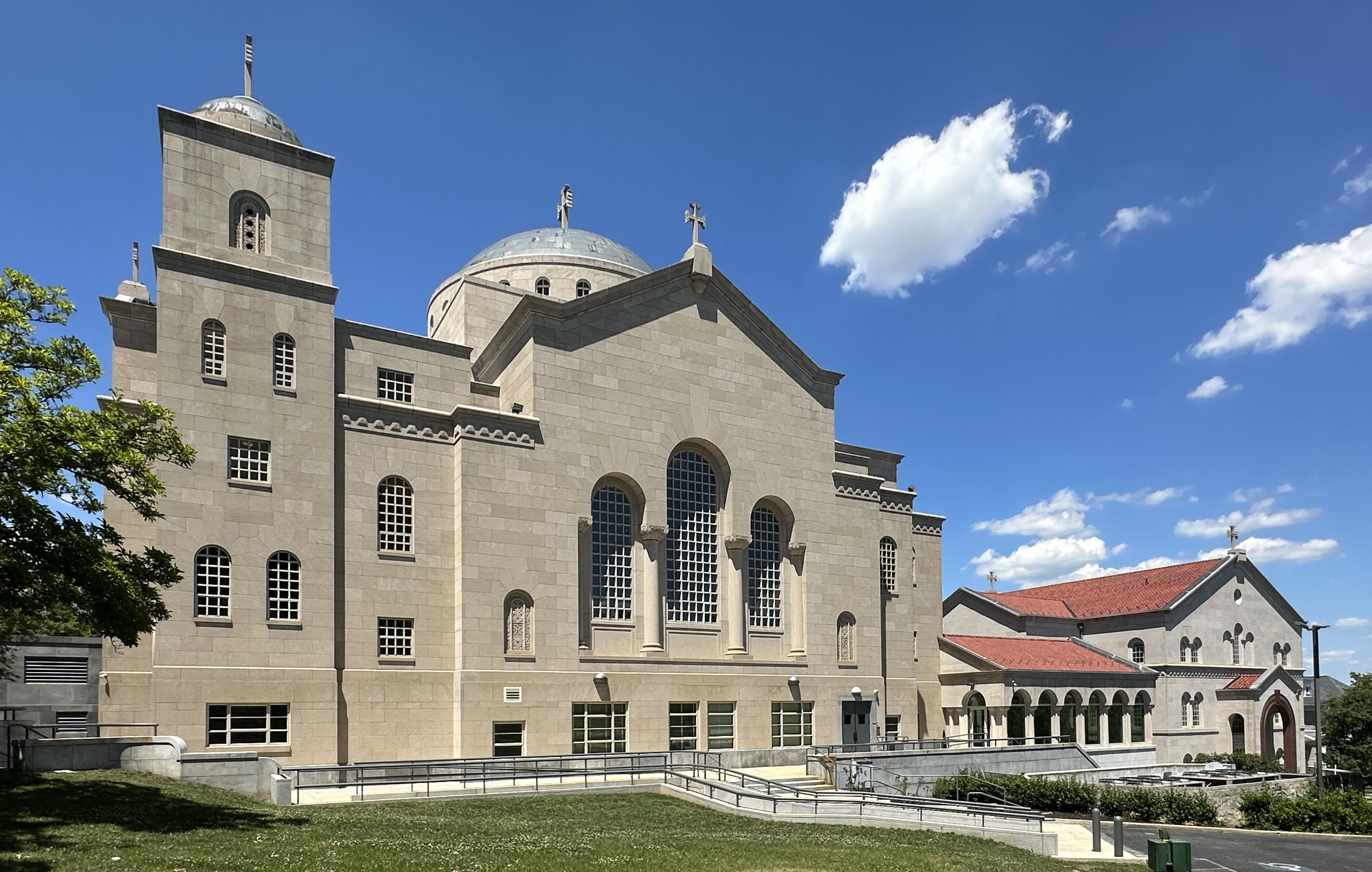
The cathedral viewed from the south

In 2003, construction began on an education center to the east of the sanctuary. It opened September 16, 2004, and contains classrooms, a library and ballroom to house gatherings. On May 10, the cathedral was consecrated in a service presided over by Archbishop Demetrios of America, Primate of the Greek Orthodox Church in America; Bishop Andonios of Phasiane, Chancellor of the Greek Orthodox Archdiocese of America; the Reverend Steven Zorzos, Presiding Priest of Saint Sophia Cathedral; the Reverend Dimitrios Lee, Assistant Priest of Saint Sophia Cathedral; the Reverend John Tavlarides, Presiding Priest Emeritus of Saint Sophia Cathedral; and Archdeacon Panteleimon Papadopoulos. As part of the service, the relics of three saints were interred in the altar table—those of Saint Panteleimon, Saint Barbara and Saint Kyrikos (representing a male saint, a female saint and one of the few child saints).
