= Saint Sophia Church, Moscow =

Church building in Moscow, Russia

Coordinates: 55°44′53″N 37°37′17″E

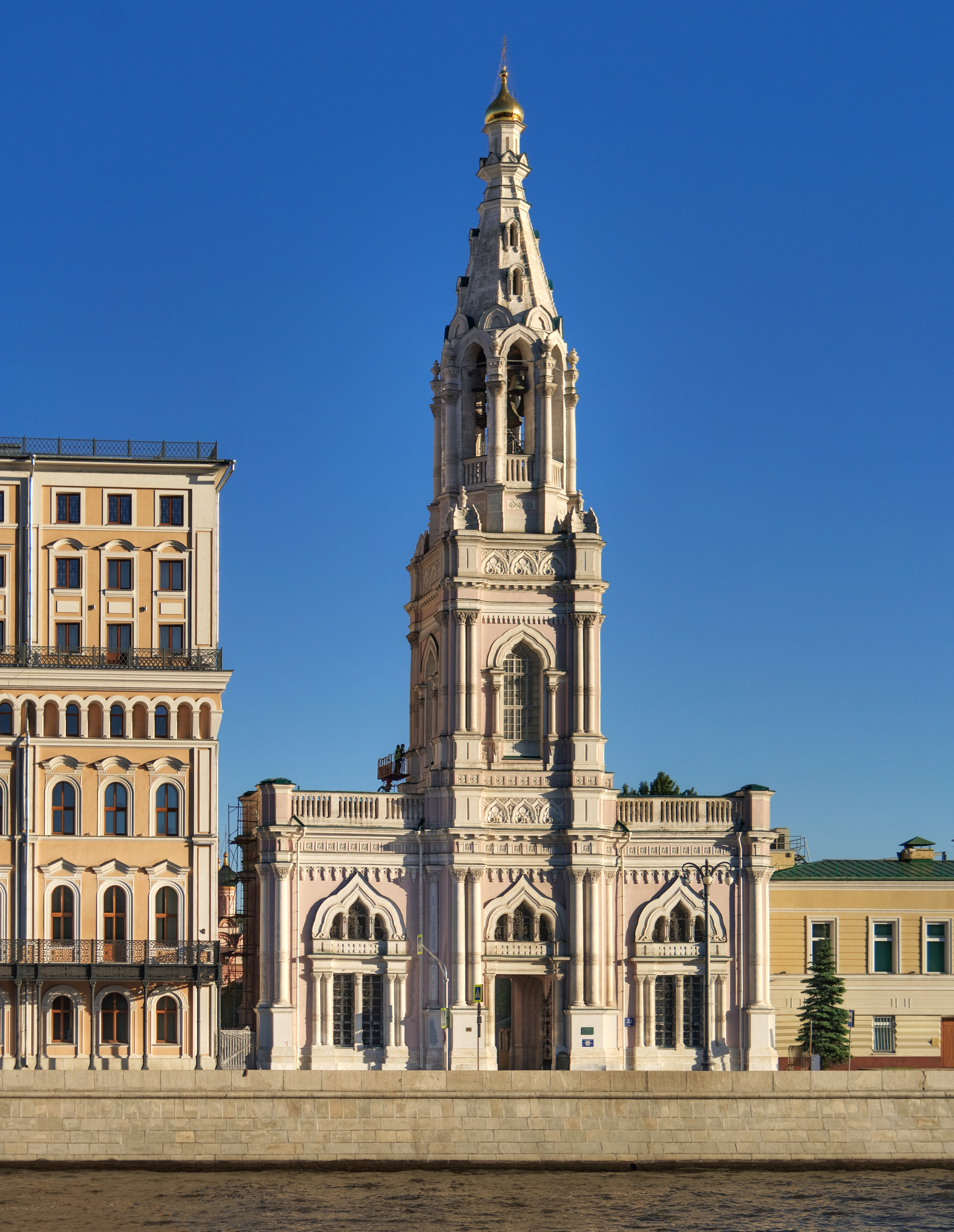
The Sofievskaya Bell Tower

The Saint Sophia Church in Middle Sadovniki (церковь Софии в Средних Садовниках) is a mid-17th-century Russian Orthodox parish church standing on the Balchug Island opposite the Moscow Kremlin.

The church of Saint Sophia is believed to have been founded by the merchants from the city of Novgorod, where the Saint Sophia Cathedral is the main sanctuary. The church gives its name to the Sofievskaya Embankment of the Moskva River. The ornate building next to the church is the headquarters of the Rosneft, the world's largest listed oil company.

The mauve frontage is dominated by a tapering bell tower rising above the entrance. The openwork belfry was designed in the 1860s so as to echo the Kremlin towers across the river. The revivalist design is by Nikolay Kozlovsky. The church was closed for worship between 1930 and 2004, with the main building being a kommunalka.
