= Ascension Cathedral, Pushkin =

St. Sophia (Ascension) Cathedral Софийский (Вознесенский) собор
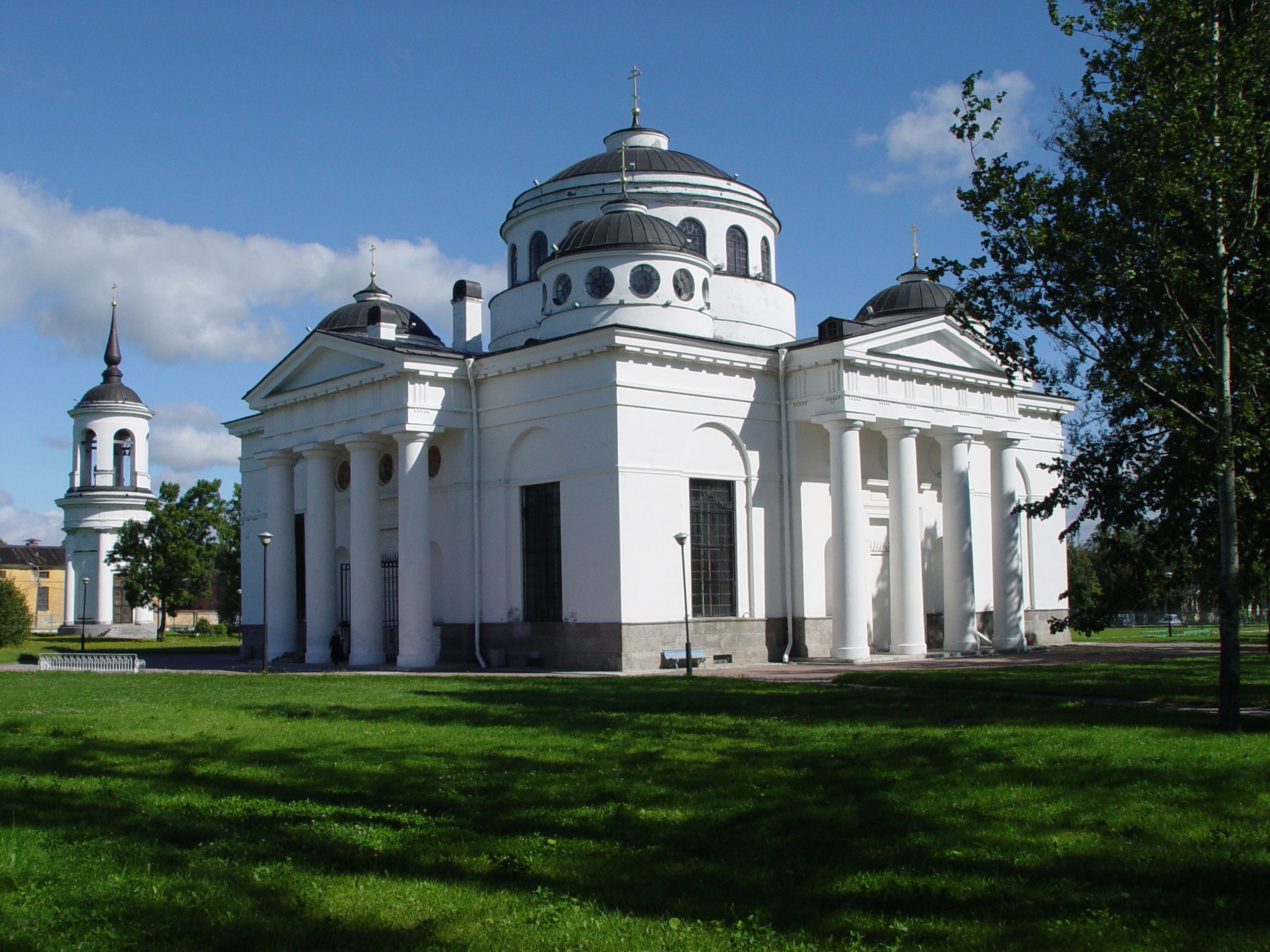
- St. Sophia (Ascension) Cathedral; Софийский (Вознесенский) собор
- 59°42′18.89″N 30°23′38.05″E
- Location: Pushkin, Saint Petersburg
- Address: 1, Sofiyskaya pl., Tsarskoye Selo, St. Petersburg; Санкт-Петербург, Царское Село, Софийская пл., 1
- Country: Russia
- Denomination: Russian Orthodox

History
- Founded: 1782
- Dedicated: 1788 (1989, 1999)

Architecture
- Architect(s): Charles Cameron, Ivan Starov; the bell tower – Leon Benois
- Style: Palladian

Administration
- Division: Tsarskoe Selo
- Diocese: Saint Petersburg and Ladoga
- Parish: St. Sophia Cathedral

Clergy
- Dean: Rev. Gennadiy Zverev

The Ascension Cathedral in the town of Sophia (now a part of Pushkin) in the vicinity of Saint Petersburg, was one of the first purely Palladian churches to be built in Russia. Rather paradoxically, it may also be defined as "the first example of Byzantinism in Russian architecture".

== History ==
=== Construction and architecture ===
The cathedral was founded in July 1782 at the instigation of Catherine II of Russia as a reminder of her lifelong Greek Plan. The Tsarina, eager to liberate Constantinople from the Turks, wished to have a replica of the Hagia Sophia in the proximity of the Catherine Palace where she spent her summers. But the first project – an exact copy of the Hagia Sophia – was very expensive.

Then the Empress called upon her favourite architect, Charles Cameron, to design this "Byzantinesque" church, but the Scottish architect, though well versed in the Palladian idiom, had a vague idea of what Byzantine architecture stood for. His design called for an austere and monumental whitewashed exterior, with Doric porticoes on each side, probably a reference to the works of Lord Burlington.

Construction works, supervised by Ivan Starov, lasted for six years. In the eventual variant, the five wide domes were placed on squat drums, vaguely reminiscent of the Hagia Eirene. The church was consecrated on 28 May 1788 in the presence of the Empress. During the two decades that followed, the Imperial Academy of Arts had the interior adorned with Neoclassical paintings. A detached two-storied belltower was added considerably later, in 1905, to a design by Leon Benois.

=== 1788–1934 ===
In 1784, the cathedral was to be the chapter church of the newly established Order of Saint Vladimir. The first dean was archpriest Andrey Samborsky, the religion teacher of the tsarina's grandsons.

In 1817, Alexander I of Russia gave the cathedral to a hussar regiment of his Leib Guard, which was quartered in Sophia. During the rest of the 19th century, the regiment had the cathedral transformed into a sort of military museum, its walls lined with marble plaques honouring the hussars' victories. Near the altar, for instance, were placed the banners captured by General Cherniaev from the Khan of Kokand.

=== 1934–1989 ===
In 1934, the Communist government had the cathedral closed down, with marble plaques and precious furnishings either nationalized or stolen.

=== Since 1989 ===
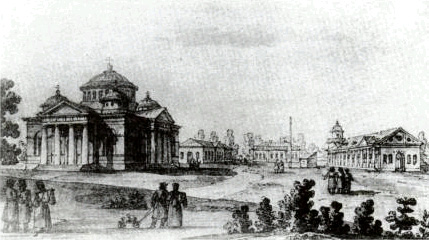
View of Sophia Cathedral, by Giacomo Quarenghi.

In 1989, the Russian Orthodox Church resumed worship there. The same year, a bust of Alexander Nevsky was added nearby, by way of commemorating the 750th anniversary of the Battle of the Neva.

The complete consecration after the restoration took place on May 19, 1999.

In 2003, a monument to the Leib Guard Hussar Regiment was erected south of the cathedral.

== See also ==
- St. Catherine's Cathedral, Kherson – contemporaneous church highlighting Russia's claims to the Byzantine heritage
- List of largest Eastern Orthodox church buildings

== Online references ==
- Sophia Cathedral on the Alexander Palace Time Machine – history, pictures, floorplans
- Sophia Cathedral, Kazan Cemetery and nearby Hospitals – from Tsarskoe Selo in 1910
