= John Pordage =

- John Pordage circa 1650s
- Born: 1607
- Died: 1681 (aged 73–74)

John Pordage (1607–1681) was a Church of England priest, astrologer, alchemist and Christian mystic. He founded the 17th-century English Behmenist group, which would later become known as the Philadelphian Society when it was led by his disciple and successor, Jane Leade.

== Early life ==
John Pordage was the eldest son of Samuel Pordage (d. 1626), grocer, by his wife Elizabeth (née Taylor), and was born in the parish of St Dionis Backchurch, London, and baptised on 21 April 1607. He matriculated as a pensioner at Pembroke College, Cambridge, in 1623, and received his B.A. in 1626.

== Religious controversy and medical practice ==
On 18 January 1633, Pordage married the widow Mary Freeman at St Gregory by St Paul's Church, London. In London, Pordage soon attracted notoriety for his unusual religious conceptions. In 1634, it was reported that “One Pordage broches new-fangled opinions concerning the signes, that No Man can trie himself by them, but was to stay by for an over-powring light.” In response, the famous puritan minister John Davenport reportedly preached against Pordage, disagreeing at length with his claims. This was an early sign of the mysticism and heterodoxy that would later make Pordage infamous. Possibly, Pordage's opinions owed something to furtive influence of the Familia Caritatis, followers of the sectarian prophet Henry Nicholis (alias H. N.). In 1637, Pordage's brother-in-law, Henry Faldo, was accused of Familism. In the 1640s, Pordage would be described as one of those who had “taught the doctrine of H. N.” in London. Despite allegations of heterodoxy, Pordage preached occasionally in London in the 1630s, acting as chaplain to Mary Lady Vere. He also reportedly preached at St Lawrence Jewry.

Meanwhile, he began to act as an unlicensed medical physician, bringing him into conflict with the Royal College of Physicians. In 1639, he travelled to the Netherlands and obtained a medical degree from Leiden University, and later that year was incorporated M.D. at Cambridge. In 1640 and 1641, he was again in trouble with the Royal College for unlicensed medical activity and malpractice.

== Behmenists ==
Pordage was curate in charge of St Laurence's, Reading, Berkshire, in 1644, the vicar being Thomas Gilbert (1613–1694). By 1647 (after 9 Nov 1646) he was rector of Bradfield, Berkshire, a living in the gift of Elias Ashmole, who thought highly of his astrological knowledge. Richard Baxter, who describes Pordage as chief of the 'Behmenists', or English followers of the German theologian Jakob Böhme, knew of him through a young man, probably Abiezer Coppe, who in 1649 was living under Pordage's roof in a 'family communion', the members 'aspiring after the highest spiritual state' through 'visible communion with angels'. Baxter thought they tried to carry too far 'the perfection of a monastical life'. Among themselves this family went by scripture names; Pordage was 'Father Abraham', his wife was 'Deborah'.

He was eventually charged before the Committee for Plundered Ministers with heresies comprised in nine articles, accusing him of a sort of mystical pantheism. But on 27 March 1651, the committee acquitted him on all counts. On 18 September 1654, he was summoned to appear on 5 October before the county commissioners (known as 'expurgators') at the Bear Inn, Speenhamland, Berkshire. The nine articles were revived against him at the instance of John Tickel, a Presbyterian minister at Abingdon, Berkshire. The inquiry was successively adjourned several times, fresh articles being from time to time brought forward against him, to the number of fifty-six, in addition to the original nine. Most of them dealt with unsubstantial matters of personal gossip; the accusation of intercourse with spirits was pressed (from 19 October) by Christopher Fowler. It was made a charge against him that he had sheltered Robert Everard and Thomas Totney. One of his maid-servants, while attesting some of the stories about spirits, bore witness to the purity and piety of the family life. By 30 November, Pordage was too ill to appear; the inquiry was adjourned to 7 December at the Bear Inn, Reading, Berkshire. On 8 December the commissioners ejected him as 'ignorant and very insufficient for the work of the ministry'. He was to leave the rectory by 2 February and clear out his barns by 25 March 1655. Subsequent to the trial he published a pamphlet, Innocencie Appearing, in which he gave his account of the proceedings, and included a document, not presented at court, in which he confessed to frequent conversations with angels. These were probably summoned by magical means.

== Reinstatement ==
At the Restoration Pordage was reinstated. In 1663, he became acquainted with Jane Lead, and assisted her in the study of Jakob Böhme. In August 1673 or 1674 (there is a doubt about the year), Pordage and Mrs Lead 'first agreed to wait together in prayer and pure dedication'. Francis Lee, Jane Lead's son-in-law, speaks of Pordage's devoutness and sincerity, maintaining that 'his conversation was such as malice itself can hardly except against'. He was not, however, a man of robust intellect; his insight into Böhme's writings was feeble, and his theosophy was of the emotional order. In his will, he describes himself as 'doctor in physick.' It does not appear that he held the degree of MD, though it was assigned to him by others, and he was commonly called Dr Pordage.

He died in 1681, and was buried in St Andrew's, Holborn, on 11 December. His will, made on 28 November 1681, and proved 17 January 1682, was witnessed by Jane Lead. His portrait was engraved by William Faithorne. His first wife Mary (Lane), of Tenbury, Worcestershire, was buried at Bradfield on 25 August 1668. His second wife was Elizabeth, widow of Thomas Faldo of London. His son Samuel Pordage was a writer and poet; he had other sons: John, William, and Benjamin. His daughter Elizabeth was buried at Bradfield on 23 December 1663; other daughters were Mary, Sarah (married in Stisted), and Abigail. His brother Francis, who survived him, was rector of Stanford Dingley, Berkshire.

In Theologia Mystica, Pordage describes a spiritual journey through the Boehmean cosmology of the three worlds of the "Dark-Fire" or wrath-world, the "Fire-Light" or severe world of common human experience, and the "Light-Fire World" or paradise.

== Works ==
He published:

1. Truth appearing through the Clouds of undeserved Scandal, &c., 1655,
2. Innocency appearing through the dark Mists of pretended Guilt, &c., 1655
3. A just Narrative of the Proceedings of the Commissioners of Berks ... against John Pordage, &c., 1655; reprinted in Stat Trials (Cobbett), 1810
4. The Fruitful Wonder ... By J. P., Student in Physic, &c., 1674, (account of four children at a birth, at Kingston upon Thames probably by Pordage).

Posthumous were

5. Theologia Mystica, or the Mystic Divinitie of the Eternal Indivisible ... By a Person of Qualitie, J. P., M.D. &c., 1683 (prefaced by Jane Lead, and edited by Dr. Edward Hooker)
6. Em griindlich philosophischei Sendschreiben, &c., Amsterdam, 1698, reprinted (1727) in F. Roth-Scholz's Deut sches Theatrum Chemicum, 1728
7. Vier Tractatlein, &c., Amsterdam, 1704

A two-page advertisement in Jane Lead's A Fountain of Gardens, 1697, gives full titles of the following works of Pordage, unpublished in English:

8. Philo sophia Mystica, &c.
9. The Angelical World, &c.
10. The Dark Fire World, &c.
11. The Incarnation of Jesus Christ, &c.
12. The Spirit of Eternity, &c.
13. Sophia, &c.
14. Experimental Discoveries, &c.

== See also ==
- Samuel Pordage
- Roger Crab
- Christian mystics
- Christian mysticism
- Esoteric Christianity
- Behmenism
- Sophia
- English Dissenters
