= Christian theosophy =

Esoteric Christian movement

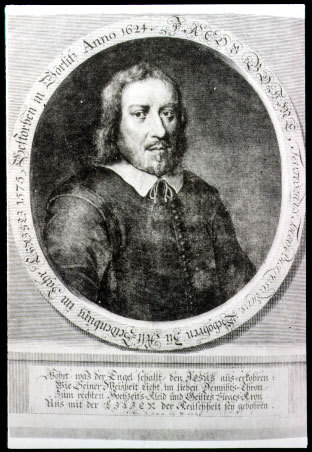
An idealised portrait of Jakob Böhme

Christian theosophy, also known as Boehmian theosophy and theosophy, refers to a range of positions within Christianity that focus on the attainment of direct, unmediated knowledge of the nature of divinity and the origin and purpose of the universe. They have been characterized as philosophies.

Theosophy is considered part of Western esotericism, which believes that hidden knowledge or wisdom from the ancient past offers a path to illumination and salvation.

While general theosophy concerns the universal aspects of diverse esoteric traditions, including Hinduism and Buddhism, Christian theosophy is limited to Jewish and Christian elements. The founding of Christian theosophy is usually attributed to the German philosopher Jakob Böhme. Jewish Kabbalah was also formative for Christian theosophy.

== Etymology and terminology ==
Theosophy comes from the Greek theosophia (θεοσοφία), which combines theos (θεός), "God" and sophia (σοφία), "wisdom". Its etymological meaning is thus "wisdom of God."

The term theosophia appeared (in both Greek and Latin) in the works of early Church Fathers, as a synonym for theology: the theosophoi are "those knowing divine things". The term however acquired various other meanings throughout its history. The adjective "theosophos" (θεόσοφος) "wise in divine things" was applied by Iamblichus to the gymnosophists (Γυμνοσοφισταί), i.e. the Indian yogis or sadhus.

Scholars of esotericism such as Godwin and Faivre differentiated the tradition of religious illumination from the religious system established in the late nineteenth century by Helena Blavatsky by referring to the latter with a capital letter as Theosophy, and the former with a lower-case letter as theosophy. Followers of Blavatsky's movement are known as Theosophists, while adherents of the older tradition are termed theosophers. Several Theosophists — such as C. C. Massey and Franz Hartmann — were also theosophers.

Antoine Faivre suggested in 1998 that it be called "Boehmian theosophy", although he himself more often uses the term Christian theosophy.

The term theosophy was used as a synonym for theology as early as the 3rd century CE. The 13th-century work Summa philosophiae attributed to Robert Grosseteste made a distinction between theosophers and theologians. In the Summa, theosophers were described as authors only inspired by the holy books, while theologians like Pseudo-Dionysius the Areopagite and Origen were described as those whose task was to explain theosophy. Therefore, the terms denoted the opposite of the present-day meaning.

During the Renaissance, use of the term diverged to refer to gnostic knowledge that offers the individual enlightenment and salvation through a knowledge of the bonds that are believed to unite her or him to the world of divine or intermediary spirits. Christian theosophy arose in Germany in the 16th century. Inspired to a considerable extent by the works of Paracelsus (1493–1541). The term had not yet reached a settled meaning, however, as the mid-16th century Theosophia by Johannes Arboreus provided a lengthy exposition that included no mention of esotericism.

== Historical development ==
In the 17th and 18th centuries, Christian theosophy and Pietism arose in response to the orthodoxy of the Lutheran Reformation.

I do not write in the pagan manner, but in the theosophical.

— Jakob Böhme

The work of the 17th-century German Christian mystic Jakob Böhme (1575–1624) strongly contributed to spread the use of the word "theosophy", even though Böhme rarely used the word in his writings. It is on account of the title of some of his works, but these titles appear to have been chosen more by the editors than by Böhme himself. Moreover, Böhme gave the word "theosophy" a limited meaning, making it clear that he was not conflating nature with God. Böhme's work has been described as being "foundational" for Christian theosophy. There were relatively few theosophers in the 17th century, but many of them were prolific. Outside of Germany, there were also theosophers from Holland, England, and France. This group is represented by Jan Baptist van Helmont (1618–1699), Robert Fludd (1574–1637), John Pordage (1608–1681), Jane Leade (1623–1704), Henry More (1614–1687), Pierre Poiret (1646–1719), and Antoinette Bourignon (1616–1680). Theosophers of this period often inquired into nature using a method of interpretation founded upon a specific myth or revelation, applying active imagination in order to draw forth symbolic meanings and further their pursuit of knowledge toward a complete understanding of these mysteries. In Athanasius Kircher's Oedipus Aegyptiacus (1652), Kircher assigned the word theosophy to the metaphysics adhered to in ancient Egypt, and to Neo-Platonism, and thus he gave once again the word one of its most generally accepted meanings, that of divine metaphysics.

In the 18th century, the word theosophy came into more widespread use among some philosophers. However, the term "theosophy" was still "practically absent" throughout the entire eighteenth century in dictionaries and encyclopedias, where it only appeared more and more frequently beginning in the second half of the nineteenth century. Theosophers themselves used the word theosophy sparingly, at least up until the middle of the nineteenth century. Johann Jakob Brucker (1696–1770) included a long chapter on theosophy in his monumental work Historia critica philosophia. (1741). He included theosophers alongside other currents in esotericism in what was then a standard reference in the history of philosophy. By the 18th century, the word theosophy was often used in conjunction with pansophy. The term theosophy is more properly reserved for the reverse process of contemplating the divine in order to discover the content of the concrete universe.

In England, Robert Hindmarsh, a printer with a Methodist background, formed a "Theosophical Society" in 1783, for translating, printing and distributing the writings of Swedenborg. This society was renamed in 1785 as "The British Society for the Propagation of the Doctrines of the New Church", consisting of Swedenborgian based beliefs. (Note: For mention of the 1783 Theosophical Society, see Odhner, Carl T., ed. (1898). Annals of the New Church. Philadelphia: Academy of the New Church. pp. 119–120, 122–123, 125, 127, 140, 219, 297, 314, 330, 405. OCLC 680808382.) In France, Denis Diderot gave the word theosophie more attention than other encyclopedias of this period by including an article on it in his Encyclopédie, published during the French Enlightenment. The article dealt mostly with Paracelsus and essentially plagiarized Brucker's "Historia".

Groups such as the Martinist Order founded by Papus in 1891, followed the theosophical current closely linked to the Judeo-Christian-Islamic tradition and Western esotericism. Theosophers outside of the initiate societies included people such as Vladimir Solovyov (1853–1900), whose views have been described as follows: "although empiricism and rationalism rest on false principles, their respective objective contents, external experience, qua the foundation of natural science, and logical thought, qua the foundation of pure philosophy, are to be synthesized or encompassed along with mystical knowledge in 'integral knowledge,' what Solovyov terms 'theosophy.'"

== Common characteristics ==
Faivre stated that "Theosophy is a gnosis that has a bearing not only on the salvific relations the individual maintains with the divine world, but also on the nature of God Himself, or of divine persons, and on the natural universe, the origin of that universe, the hidden structures that constitute it in its actual state, its relationship to mankind, and its final ends."

Theosophy actually designates a specific flow of thought or tradition within the modern study of esotericism. Thus, it follows the path starting from the more modern period of the 15th century onward. Faivre describes the "theosophic current" or theosophy as a single esoteric current among seven other esoteric currents in early modern Western thought (i.e., alchemy, astrology, Neo-Alexandrian Hermeticism, Christian Kabbalah, Paracelsism—that is, the studying of the "prognostications" of Paracelsus—philosophia occulta and Rosicrucianism).

Faivre noted that there are "obvious similarities" between earlier theosophy and modern Theosophy as both play an important part in Western esotericism and both claim to deal with wisdom from a gnostic perspective. But he says there are also differences, since they do not actually rely on the same reference works; and their style is different. The referential corpus of earlier theosophy "belongs essentially to the Judeo-Christian type", while that of modern Theosophy "reveals a more universal aspect". Although there are many differences between Christian theosophy and the Theosophical movement begun by Helena Blavatsky, the differences "are not important enough to cause an insurmountable barrier". Theosophists like Blavatsky and W.Q. Judge wrote about Jakob Böhme's philosophy. Böhme was also an important influence on the ideas of Franz Hartmann, the founder in 1886 of the German branch of the Theosophical Society. Hartmann described the writings of Böhme as “the most valuable and useful treasure in spiritual literature.”

Theosophers engage in analysis of the universe, humanity, divinity, and the reciprocal effects of each on the other. Their departure point therefore may be knowledge of external things in the world or inner experiences, and the theosopher's aim is to discover deeper meanings in the natural or divine realm. Antoine Faivre notes, "the theosophist dedicates his energy to inventing (in the word's original sense of 'discovering') the articulation of all things visible and invisible, by examining both divinity and nature in the smallest detail." The knowledge that is acquired through meditation is believed to change the being of the meditator.

Faivre identified three characteristics of theosophy. The three characteristics of theosophy are listed below.

Theosophy:

1. Divine/Human/Nature Triangle: The inspired analysis which circles through these three angles. The intradivine within; the origin, death and placement of the human relating to Divinity and Nature; Nature as alive, the external, intellectual and material. All three complex correlations synthesize via the intellect and imaginative processes of Mind.
2. Primacy of the Mythic: The creative Imagination, an external world of symbols, glyphs, myths, synchronicities and the myriad, along with image, all as a universal reality for the interplay conjoined by creative mind.
3. Access to Supreme Worlds: The awakening within, inherently possessing the faculty to directly connect to the Divine world(s). The existence of a special human ability to create this connection. The ability to connect and explore all levels of reality; co-penetrate the human with the divine; to bond to all reality and experience a unique inner awakening.

== Legacy and reception ==
The scholar of esotericism Wouter Hanegraaff described Christian theosophy as "one of the major currents in the history of Western esotericism".

Christian theosophy is an under-researched area; a general history of it has never been written. The French scholar Antoine Faivre had a specific interest in the theosophers and illuminists of the eighteenth and nineteenth centuries. He wrote his doctoral thesis on Karl von Eckartshausen and Christian theosophy. Scholars of esotericism have argued that Faivre's definition of Western esotericism relies on his own specialist focus on Christian theosophy, Renaissance Hermeticism, and Romantic Naturphilosophie and therefore creates an "ideal" type of esotericism that does not suit all esoteric currents.
