= Thomasine Pendarves =

English aspiring visionary prophet

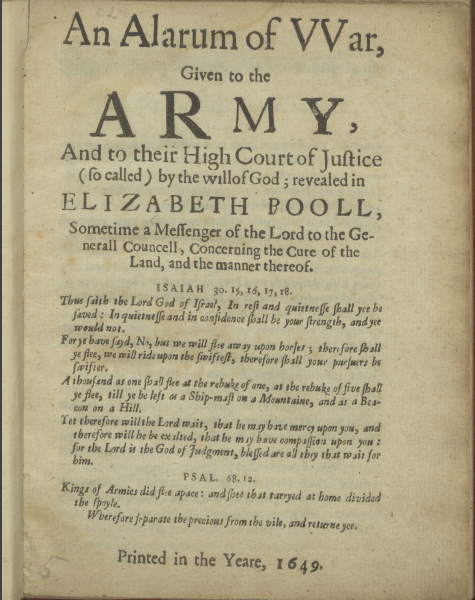
- An Alarum of War... by Elizabeth Poole included a supporting letter by Pendarves
- Born: Thomasine Newcomen prob. 1618
- Died: after 1671
- Known for: visionary prophet with influence on Abingdon Baptists
- Spouse: John Pendarves
- Children: six

Thomasine Pendarves (prob. 1618 – after 1671) was an English aspiring visionary prophet with influence on Abingdon Baptists. She was said to have deviant views and these were independent of her husband. Her writing on nature was anthologised in 2021.

== Life ==
She was baptised on 13 September 1618 in Dartmouth. Her parents were Bathsave (born Philpott) and Thomas Newcomen and they were from an influential family with interests in Ireland and the mining of tin. She took an interest in the Abingdon Baptists where she had a mystical approach. Her interest seems to predate her marriage in 1647. Letters she exchanged with Abiezer Coppe show that she had ambitions to be, like him, a visionary prophet.

Her friend Elizabeth Poole published two pamphlets An Alarum of War (1649) and Another Allarum of War (1649) written in defence of her mistaken prophecies concerning the king's execution. Her publications include a restatement of her ability to prophesy despite her mistakes. They include an apologetic letter from Pendarves aka "T.P." to the Congregation of Saints to forgive Poole as "T.P." believes that would be God's will.

Pendarves was the subject of speculation after Abiezer Coppe, ungraciously, published letters he had exchanged with her in 1649. They were included in his first publication Some Sweet Sips of some Spiritual Wine. Coppe gave the impression that he was keeping her identity secret by using Hebrew letters to hide her name, but it was obvious to those who knew them who it was who wrote the letters. The letters reveal her private views and hint at an intimate and proscribed relationship between them. Thomasine is seen as holding "deviant views" in a group that included Coppe and John Pordage. Her husband is credited with resisting her influence of the Abingon baptists and that of the Quakers. The baptist congregation in Abingdon dates from 1650 (the church was much later).

Baptist minister William Kiffin had written to her husband to suggest that he should remove Elizabeth Poole from her pulpit. Luckily the letter was intercepted by Thomasine who replied to Kiffen telling him that his suggestion was ill-advised and he should in future write to her as she did not trust her husband to act correctly. Poole later published this letter but it is not known if anything resulted from her letter to Kiffen.

== Death and legacy ==
She outlived her husband and she was fined in Abingdon several times for not attending church. The last occasion was in 1671 and there is no other record of her further life or death.

Her writing about nature is included by Katharine Norbury in her anthology "Women on Nature". The book was published in 2021 and includes dozens of writers including Pendarves, Jan Morris, Jane Austen, Vanessa Bell, Enid Blyton, and Virginia Woolf.

== Private life ==
She was married to John Pendarves by 1647. He came to Crowan in Cornwall and he was educated at Oxford University. His wife was of an independent mind. She later intercepted a letter to her husband and replied with her own (and more important) opinion. They had six children.
