= Philadelphian Society =

17th-century English dissenter group

The Philadelphians, or the Philadelphian Society, were a 17th-century English dissenter group. They were organized around John Pordage (1607–1681), an Anglican priest from Bradfield, Berkshire, who had been ejected from his parish in 1655 because of differing views, but then reinstated in 1660 during the English Restoration. Pordage was attracted to the ideas of Jakob Böhme, a Lutheran theosophist and Christian mystic.

== Origins ==
A group of followers came to Pordage, including Ann Bathurst and led by Mrs. Jane Leade (1624–1704), who experienced a number of visions and later published them in her book A Fountain of Gardens. The group incorporated as The Philadelphian Society for the Advancement of Piety and Divine Philosophy in 1694 (their name was inspired by the Philadelphians mentioned in the Book of Revelation). They rejected the idea of being a church, preferring the term society, and none of the members ceased their memberships in existing churches. Together, the group held views that were somewhat similar to Panentheism, regarding the belief in the presence of God in all things, and with a Nondualist component, in that they also believed the presence of the Holy Spirit exists in each and everyone's soul, and that one can become enlightened and illuminated by living a virtuous life and seeking truth through the wisdom of God.

== Basic beliefs ==
Leade's visions were a central part of the group. Around 1694, she became a Christian Universalist, rejecting the "Doctrine that hath been preached of an endless Misery and Torment" which had "wrought little effect in frightening or terrifying 'em from their evil Courses." She believed that punishment after death was purgative, not punitive. The group's views were spread to continental Europe by Francis Lee, a non-juror at the accession of William III. The group drew up a formal confession of beliefs in 1703. However, after the death of Mrs. Leade in 1704, the group's numbers dwindled quickly.

== Influences ==
In later years, although no longer officially a functioning group, many of the Philadelphian Society's views and writings, particularly those by Leade, remained influential among certain groups of Behmenists, Pietists, Radical Pietists, Christian mystics, and Esoteric Christians, such as the Society of the Woman in the Wilderness (led by Johannes Kelpius), the Ephrata Cloister, and the Harmony Society, among others.

== Notable members ==
- John Pordage
- Jane Leade
- Samuel Pordage
- Roger Crab
- Ann Bathurst
- Richard Roach

== See also ==
- South Place Ethical Society
- English Dissenters
- Christian mysticism
- Esoteric Christianity
- Jakob Böhme
- Behmenism
- Sophia (wisdom)
