= Ann Bathurst =

17th-century English diarist and prophet

Ann Bathurst was a prophet and member of the 17th century English dissenter group, the Philadelphian Society.

== Life and work ==
Not much is known of Bathurst's family, and what is known is due to her two-volume manuscript diary covering the period 1679 to 1696. This survives as a autograph fragment (Oxford, Bodleian Library, MS Rawl. Q. e. 28) and three fair copies, Oxford, Bodleian Library MS Rawl. D. 1262, Manchester, Chetham's Library. MS Mun A.7.64, and St Petersburg, Library of the Russian Academy of Science, MS Q. 538. It appears that Bathurst came from a religious background, and her diary begins with an autobiographical account that describes family prayer and Bible reading.

By 1697, the Philadelphians met at Bathurst's house in Baldwins Gardens, London every Sunday, where she lived with Joanna Openbridge. This group are known to have held millennialist views, and Bathurst produced prophetic visions that resulted in a 'lyrical, woman-inclusive representation of mystical theology'. She was considered as a possible successor to Jane Leade who led the group until her death in 1704. This was prevented by Bathurst's own death at around the same time.
