= Richard Roach =

English divine

- Born: 18 July 1662; London, England
- Died: 26 August 1730 (aged 68)
- Occupation: Church of England clergyman

Richard Roach (18 July 1662 – 26 August 1730) was a Church of England clergyman and a member of the Philadelphian Society.

== Biography ==
Roach was the son of Thomas Roach, of London. Richard was born there on 18 July 1662, and admitted a scholar of Merchant Taylors' School in 1677. His senior schoolfellow by one year, Dr. Francis Lee, remained through life his constant friend. Roach became head scholar, and was elected on 16 July 1681 to St. John's College, Oxford, graduating B.A. 1686, M.A. 1688. He was admitted to deacon's orders by Gilbert Ironside, bishop of Bristol, on 29 September 1689, in Wadham College Chapel, took priest's orders on 16 March following, and graduated B.D. in 1695, having been appointed on 17 March 1690 rector of St. Augustine's, Hackney, where he remained until his death on 26 August 1730. He was buried at St. Bride's, Fleet Street, on 30 August.

Roach was always inclined to mysticism, and when Lee devoted himself to the cause of Mrs. Jane Lead, Roach followed. He assisted to write the "Theosophical Transactions of the Philadelphian Society" in 1697, and contributed verses to be included in the mystical writings of Mrs. Lead, which were written from dictation and published by Lee. He edited "A Perswasive to Moderation and Forbearance in Love among the Divided Forms of Christians," of Jeremiah White, London, 8vo, no date; and published "The Great Crisis, or the Mystery of the Times and Seasons Unfolded," London, 1725 (not issued until 1727), 8vo, being preparatory to "The Imperial Standard of Messiah Triumphant. Coming now in the Power and Kingdom of His Father, to reign with His Saints on Earth," London, 1728, 8vo. In the latter extracts from Mrs. Lead's works are interspersed with verses by Roach. Rawlinson remarks of Roach "Nescio quâ fide obiit," but he adhered to the Philadelphian teaching.
