= John Pendarves =

English Puritan controversialist

John Pendarves (1622–1656) was an English Puritan controversialist. His wife Thomasine Pendarves was of an independent mind. She was the subject of speculation after Abiezer Coppe published letters her had exchanged with her. She later intercepted a letter to her husband and replied with her own (and more important) opinion.

== Life ==
The son of John Pendarves of Crowan in Cornwall, John Pendarves was born at Skewes in that parish. He was admitted a servitor of Exeter College, Oxford, on 11 December 1637. He matriculated on 9 February 1638, on the same day as his elder brother, Ralph Pendarves, and became a competent disputant. He graduated B.A. on 3 March 1642, and took his name off the college books on 14 July 1642.

For a time he was the parish lecturer of Wantage in Berkshire, but after several changes he became a defiant Baptist minister of a congregation at Abingdon. He challenged orthodox clergy to public debate, and Jasper Mayne undertook to meet him, in the church of Watlington, Oxfordshire. A well-attended discussion ended without any definite result. The eighth article brought against Edward Pocock, when he was cited in 1655 to appear before the commissioners for ejecting ignorant and scandalous ministers, was that he had refused to allow Pendarves to preach in his pulpit at Childrey.

Baptist minister William Kiffin had written to Pendarves to suggest that he should remove Elizabeth Poole from her pulpit. Luckily the letter was intercepted by Thomasina Pendarves who replied to Kiffen telling him that his suggestion was ill advised and moreover he should in future write to her as she did not trust her husband to act correctly. Poole later published this letter but it is not known if anything resulted from his wife's letter to Kiffen.

== Death ==
At the beginning of September 1656 Pendarves died in London. His body was carried by water to Abingdon in a chest; it arrived there on Saturday, 27 September and three days later was conveyed to a piece of ground at the west end of the town that had been purchased as a burial-place for his congregation. Crowds came from neighbouring villages, and spent the preceding and succeeding days in religious exercises; but on 2 October Major-general Bridges sent fifty horse soldiers from Wallingford to dissolve the meetings.

== Works ==
Pendarves was a Fifth Monarchy man, and in 1656 issued a volume called ‘Arrowes against Babylon,’ in which he attacked the churches of Rome and England, attempted to reform the apparel of the saints, and addressed certain queries to the Quakers, accusing them of concealing their beliefs, and of condemning Christian pastors, yet preaching themselves. The first part of this treatise was answered by the Rev. William Ley of Wantage, the Rev. John Tickell, and the Rev. Christian Fowler of St. Mary's, Reading. The Quakers were championed by James Naylor and Denys Hollister. In the same year Pendarves joined four other dissenting ministers in preparing an address to their congregations, entitled ‘Sighs for Sion,’ and with Christopher Feake he composed prefaces for an anonymous pamphlet on ‘The Prophets Malachy and Isaiah prophecying.’

A sermon which Pendarves had preached in Petty France, London, on 10 June 1656, was published after his death by John Cox.

== Private life ==
He married Thomasine Pendarves by 1647. She came from St Petrox in Dartmouth. Her parents Bathsave (born Philpott) and Thomas Newcomen were from an influential family with interests in Ireland and the mining of tin. His wife was of an independent mind. She was the subject of speculation after Abiezer Coppe published letters he had exchanged with her. She later intercepted a letter to her husband and replied with her own (and more important) opinion (see above).
