= Francis Lee (physician) =

Francis Lee (12 March 1661 – 23 August 1719) was an English writer and physician, known for his connection with the Philadelphians.

== Early life ==
Born at Cobham, Surrey on 12 March 1661, he was the fourth son of Edward Lee by his wife Frances. He entered Merchant Taylors' School on 11 September 1675, was admitted a scholar of St John's College, Oxford, on St. Barnabas day, 1679, proceeded B.A. on 9 May 1688, M.A. 19 March 1687, and was elected to a fellowship at St. John's in January 1682.

In 1691 Lee became chaplain to John Stawell, 2nd Baron Stawell of Somerton in Somerset, and tutor to his son. He was also tutor to Sir William Dawes. At the Glorious Revolution he was a nonjuror, and failed to proceed B.D. in 1692 as the statutes directed. Lee left England in the summer of 1691. He studied medicine, and on 11 June 1692 entered the university of Leyden, after which he practised medicine in Venice. At this period Lee met Johann Georg Gichtel and Pierre Poiret.

== Follower of Jane Leade ==
On his way home in 1694, Lee made the acquaintance in Holland of the writings of Jane Leade. He sought her out on his return to London, and became a devoted disciple. He arranged her manuscripts, published them with prefaces of his own, and supported her in her troubles. His elder brother, William, a dyer in Spitalfields, tried to break the connection, but about 1696 Lee, at Leade's suggestion, married her daughter Barbara Walton, a widow, and later lived in her house in Hogsden Square.

In 1697 Lee was a chief founder of the Philadelphian Society in London. He edited, and with Richard Roach wrote, the Theosophical Transactions issued by the society between March and November 1697. The meetings of the society in Baldwin's Gardens became so crowded that they were moved to Hungerford Market and Westmoreland House. Henry Dodwell the elder criticised Lee for his support of the society, and a controversy between them went on until 1701. Dodwell's arguments, coupled with those of Edward Stephens in 1702, may have affected the Philadelphian Society, which broke up in 1703.

== Later life ==
Lee moved to other directions. He is said to have suggested to Henry Hoare and Robert Nelson the foundation of charity schools, on the German model. On 25 June 1708 he became a licentiate of the College of Physicians in London. He died intestate on 23 August 1719 of fever at Gravelines in French Flanders, on a visit which included meeting Jeanne Guyon. His estate was administered by William Lee in October 1719, in favour of his widow and his only daughter, Deborah Jemima, who became the wife of James de la Fontaine.

== Works ==
Lee was reputed learned, was nicknamed "Rabbi Lee", but only published anonymously. His works included:

- Horologium Christianum, Oxford, 1689.
- The Labouring Person's Remembrancer, or a Practical Discourse of the Labour of the Body, Oxford, 1690.
- The Preface to A Letter to some Divines, London, 1695, translated from the High Dutch of Dr. Peterson.
- The History of Montanism, London, 1709, as part ii. of The Spirit of Enthusiasm exorcised by George Hickes. This work was taken as a recantation of his devotion to Jane Leade.
- The Christian's Exercise (Thomas à Kempis), London, 1715, 1716, 1717, sometimes attributed to Nelson, who wrote the Address prefixed.
- Considerations concerning Oaths London, 1716, n.p., 1722, n.p. n.d.
- Memoirs of the Life of Mr. John Kettlewell; compiled from the collections of Hickes and Nelson, London, 1718.
- The Unity of the Church and Expediency of Forms of Prayer, London, 1719.
- An Epistolary Discourse, concerning the Books of Ezra. . . . Together with a New Version of the Fifth Book of Esdras, London, 1722; begun in 1709 to precede a separate publication of Simon Ockley's translation of Esdras from the Arabic, and posthumously published by Dr. Thomas Haywood from Lee's manuscripts. William Whiston's exposition of the fifth vision of Esdras was intended as a supplement to Lee's manuscript 'Exposition of the VII. Visions.'
- A collection of some of Lee's works called Απολειπόμενα, or Dissertations, Theological, Mathematical, and Physical, London, 1752.

Lee edited the second volume of John Ernest Grabe's Septuagint from the author's manuscripts, Oxford, 1719, and wrote the prolegomena to the historical portion of the work, the manuscript of which is preserved in the Bodleian Library. He supplied annotations to the Book of Genesis in Samuel Parker's Bibliotheca Biblica, 1720. He is said to have helped Nelson in his Festivals and Fasts, and, from manuscripts given to him by the author, published Nelson's Address to Persons of Quality and Estate, London, 1715. Nelson's papers at his death went to Lee, but he did not live to write Nelson's life.

A paraphrase or enlargement of Jakob Boehme's Treatise on the Supernatural Life, by Lee (incorrectly attributed to William Law in a footnote), was inserted in some copies of the fourth volume of Boehme's Works published in 1781 (pp. 73–104). Mystical poems inserted in Jane Leade's works, ascribed to Lee by Christopher Walton, may have been the work of Richard Roach. An account of Jane Leade's last days, by Lee, was published in a German translation in Amsterdam, but does not appear to be extant. A manuscript retranslation into English was in the Walton Library (then in Dr. Williams's Library), with letters by Lee on the occasion of Leade's death.

== Notes ==
Attribution

This article incorporates text from a publication now in the public domain: Lee, Sidney, ed. (1892). "Lee, Francis". Dictionary of National Biography. Vol. 32. London: Smith, Elder & Co.
