= Roger Crab =

English hermit (1621–1680)

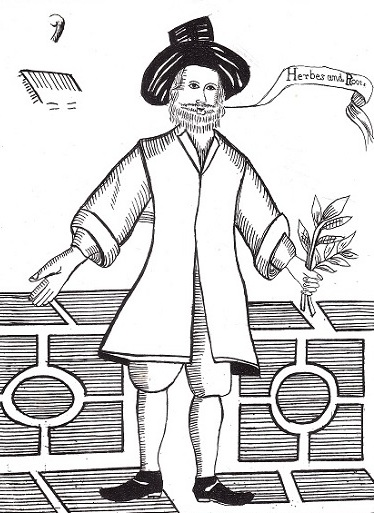
- Roger Crab, as pictured in an 1813 edition of James Caulfield's Portraits, memoirs, and characters of remarkable persons, from the reign of King Edward the Third, to the Revolution, etc.
- Born: 1621; Buckinghamshire, England
- Died: 11 September 1680 (aged 59); Bethnal Green, Middlesex, England
- Occupations: Soldier; haberdasher; herbal doctor and writer

Roger Crab (1621 – 11 September 1680) was an English soldier, haberdasher, herbal doctor and writer who is best known for his ascetic lifestyle which included Christian vegetarianism. Crab fought in the Parliamentary Army in the English Civil War before becoming a haberdasher in Chesham. He later became a hermit and worked as a herbal doctor. He then joined the Philadelphians and began promoting asceticism through his writings.

== Early life ==
Crab was born in Buckinghamshire in 1621. At the time of his birth, his mother had an annual income of £20. As a young man, he began trying to find a way to live a perfect life. In 1641, he ceased eating meat, dairy and eggs. He also chose to be celibate.

At the outbreak of the English Civil War in 1642, he joined the Parliamentary Army under Oliver Cromwell. During one battle he received a serious head wound from a sword. During his time as a soldier, he was at one point sentenced to death by Cromwell. He was later sentenced to two years in prison by Parliament. It has been suggested that Crab was involved with the Levellers in the late 1640s and that he was imprisoned as a result.

== Career ==
After leaving the military, Crab moved to Chesham. There he began working as a haberdasher. He continued this work between 1649 and 1652. In 1652 he moved to Ickenham and lived as a hermit. Believing that profit was sinful, he gave away almost all of his possessions before moving. He built up a practice as a herbal doctor, advising his patients to avoid meat and alcohol. He was a popular doctor among the village women. However, he was accused of witchcraft by a clergyman, possibly due to prophecies he issued. He attempted to live modestly, wearing homemade sackcloth clothes. He moved to Bethnal Green in 1657. There he joined the Philadelphians; a group founded by John Pordage.

== Views ==
Crab was an anti-sabbatarian. He did not observe Sunday as a non-working day, and was put in the stocks for it. He was a pacifist, and had radical views on the evils of property, the Church, and universities.

Crab held the unorthodox view that meat-eating was the cause, rather than a consequence of, the Biblical fall of man. By the age of 20, Crab was living on a diet of vegetables and water "avoiding butter, cheese, eggs, and milk." Crab argued that "eating of flesh is an absolute enemy to pure nature" and believed there was a connection between meat-eating and aggression.

Crab ate a vegan diet from 1641 until his death in 1680. He initially included potatoes and carrots in his diet, but later gave them up in favour of a diet of mostly bran and turnips. Later in his life he ate only Rumex and grass, claiming to spend 3/4 d. per week on food. Late in his life he added parsnips to his diet.

== Works ==
Crab wrote his autobiography while living in Ickenham.

- The English hermite, or, Wonder of this age.: Being a relation of the life of Roger Crab, living neer Uxbridg, taken from his own mouth, shewing his strange reserved and unparallel'd kind of life, who counteth it a sin against his body and soule to eate any sort of flesh, fish, or living creature, or to drinke any wine, ale, or beere. He can live with three farthings a week. His constant food is roots and hearbs, as cabbage, turneps, carrets, dock-leaves, and grasse; also bread and bran, without butter or cheese: his cloathing is sack-cloath. He left the Army, and kept a shop at Chesham, and hath now left off that, and sold a considerable estate to give to the poore, shewing his reasons from the Scripture, Mark. 10. 21. Jer. 35. (London: Printed, and are to be sold in Popes-head Alley, and at the Exchange 1655).
- Dagons-Downfall; or, the Great idol digged up root and branch (London 1657). ( – in which he declared that the Sabbath had been turned into an idol).
- Gentle correction for the high flown backslider, or, A soft answer to turn away strife : being a general answer (in few words) to some queries, and defamations thrown out by the furious spirit in some of the people called Quakers against the rationalls (London: Printed by J.B 1659).
- A tender salutation, or, The substance of a letter given forth by the Rationals, to the despised remnant and seed of God, in the people called Quakers (London: Printed by J.B 1659).

A Reply to the Gentle Correction was made by George Salter (London: printed for Thomas Simmons at the Bull and mouth neer Aldersgate 1659):

An answer to Roger Crabs printed paper to the Quakers. And likewise to his principles and doctrines, whose spirit is tried and found in the dark. Which is to be directed again to Roger Crab and his followers, who cryed up his paper; that they may learn wisdom to preserve them in innocency, in the power of God, in which there is no confusion.

== Death ==
In 1680, Crab died at the age of 59 in Bethnal Green, and was buried at Stepney Churchyard. His tombstone has the following epitaph:

Tread gently, reader, near the dust
Committed to this tomb-stone's trust:
For while 'twas flesh, it held a guest
With universal love possest:
A soul that stemmed opinion's tide,
Did over sects in triumph ride;
Yet separate from the giddy crowd,
And paths tradition had allowed.
Through good and ill reports he past,
Oft censured, yet approved at last.
Wouldst thou his religion know?
In brief 'twas this: to all to do
Just as he would be done unto.
So in kind Nature's law he stood,
A temple, undefiled with blood,
A friend to everything that 's good.
The rest angels alone can fitly tell;
Haste then to them and him; and so farewell!'

== Legacy ==
Christopher Hill suggested that Crab may have been the inspiration for Lewis Carroll's character the Mad Hatter.

== Selected publications ==
- The English Hermite, Or, Wonder of this Age (1655)
