= Steven Blankaart =

Dutch physician, iatrochemist, and entomologist

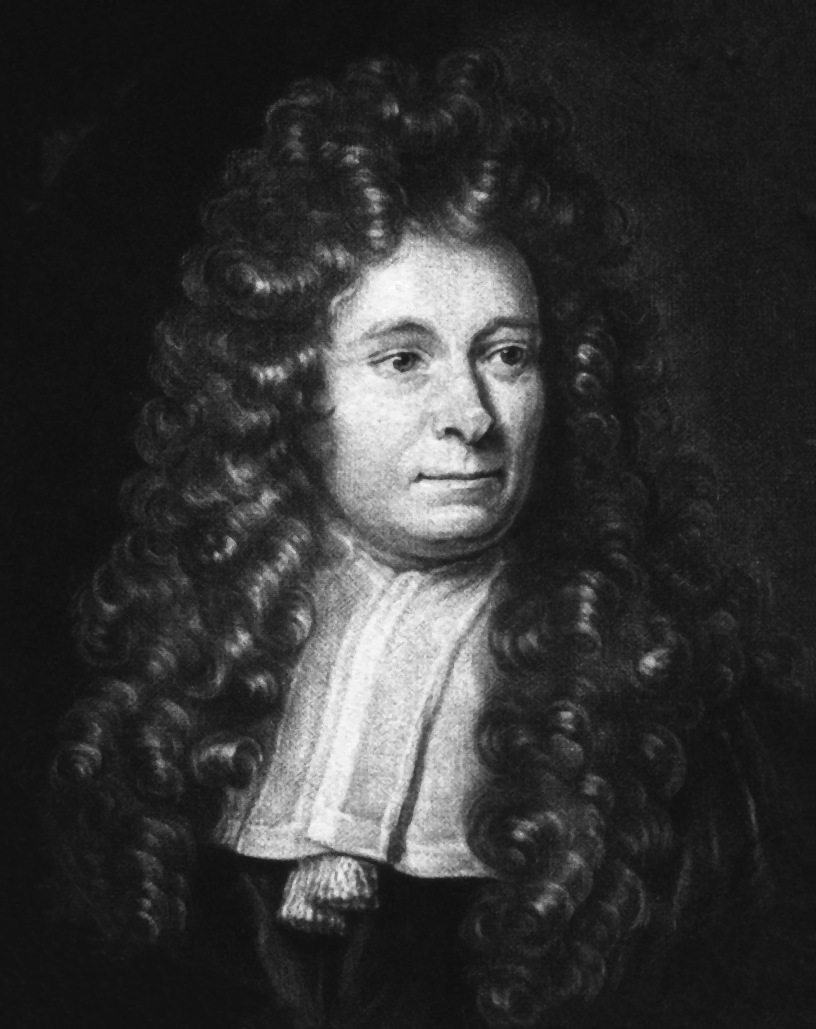
Steven Blankaart

Steven Blankaart Latinized as Stephanus Blancardus (24 October 1650, Middelburg – 23 February 1704, Amsterdam) was a Dutch physician, iatrochemist, and entomologist, who worked on the same field as Jan Swammerdam. Blankaart proved the existence of a capillary system, as had been suggested by Leonardo da Vinci, by spouting up blood vessels, though he failed to realize the true significance of his findings. He is known for his development of injection techniques for this study and for writing the first Dutch book on child medicine. Blankaart translated works of John Mayow.

== Life ==
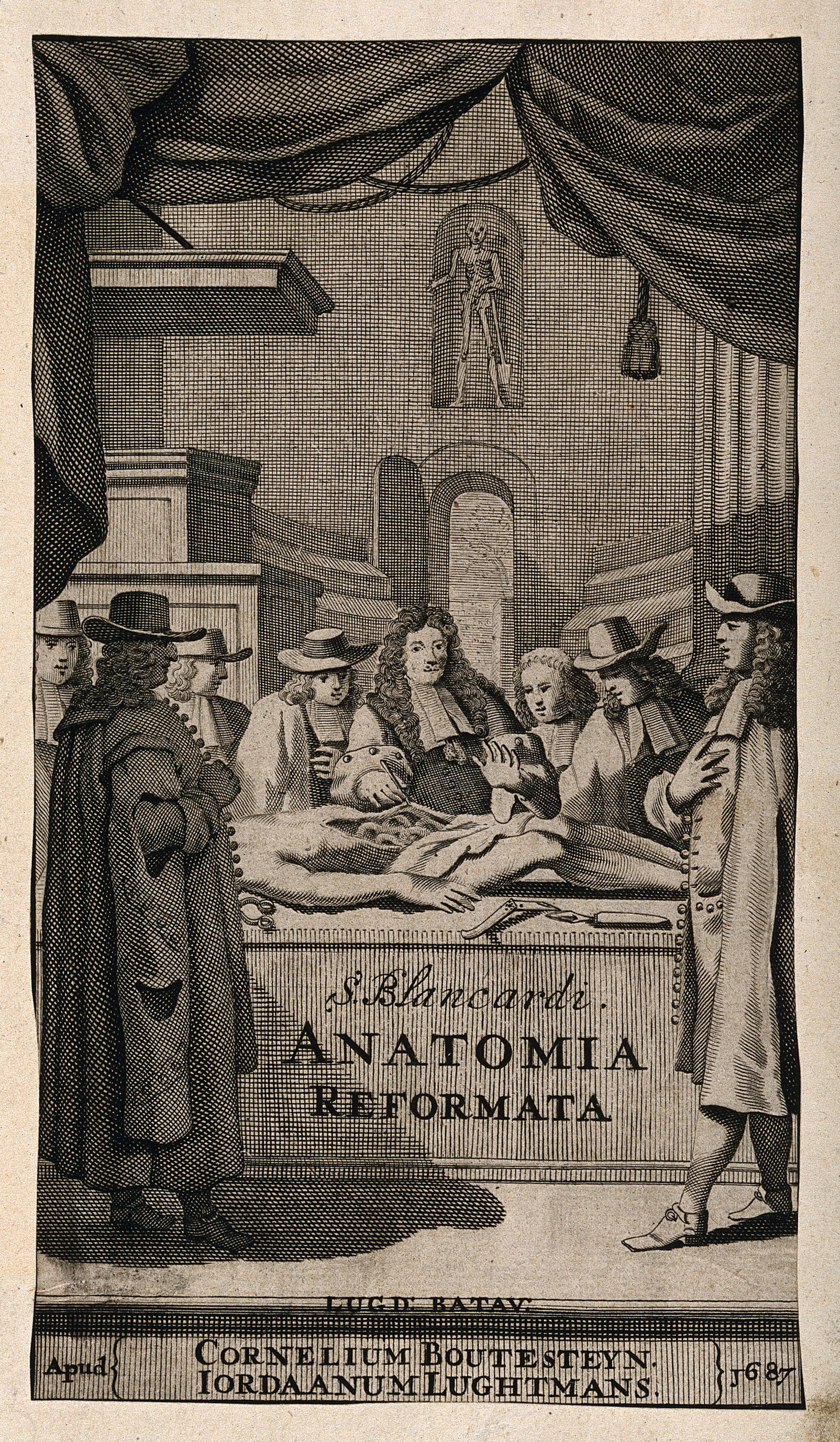
Conducting a dissection, 1687 engraving

Blankaart was the son of Nicolaas Blankaart, a professor in Greek and History in Steinfurt (1645–1650) and Middelburg (1650–1666), who moved to Heerenveen to become the physician of Countess Albertine Agnes of Nassau; he was appointed in Franeker in 1669. His son started as an apprentice of an apothecary. In 1674 he moved to Amsterdam after becoming a doctor of Philosophy and Medicine at the University of Franeker.

Blankaart followed the principles established by René Descartes and was one of the first physicians to be a scientist or empiricist. In order to disprove the theory that insects originated spontaneously from filth and to demonstrate that they developed from eggs, Blankaart repeated the experiments carried out by Francesco Redi. Blankaart used oil made from turpentine to save the insects from mites, and mentioned it in his book Schou-burg from 1688.

Blankaart corresponded with the mystical writer Antoinette Bourignon. He argued in one letter that an earthly paradise would be created if there were a prohibition of alcohol. He collaborated with Maria Sibylla Merian on the publication of her work.

In 1682, he had married Isabella de Carpentier, the daughter of a referent from Amersfoort, and in 1683, they had one child. At that time he lived on Warmoesstraat. Blankaart was one of the first to do research on children's education and incontinence. Blankaart was a follower of Franciscus Sylvius, who recommended drinking copious quantities of tea and coffee. and worked on syphilis. Blankaart was living in the Leidsestraat when he died; he was buried in the Westerkerk.

== Some works ==
- Lexicon medicum graeco-latinum (1679) (digital edition from 1718 by the University and State Library Düsseldorf)
- Collectanea medico-physico oft Hollands Jaer-Register der geneesen natuurkunde aanmerkingen (1680, 1683, 1686).
- Traité de la verole, gonorrhee, chancres, bubes venéreens, & de leurs accidens, avec une guerison véritable et solide (1688), published by Cornelis Blankaart, bookseller in the Warmoesstraat.
- Lexicon Medicum Graco Latinum and many other medical treatises and books on anatomy and surgery.
- Schou-Burg der Rupsen, Wormen, Maden en Vliegende Dierkens daar uit voortkomende. Door eigen ondervindinge by een gebragt. Amsterdam, J. ten Hoorn. A work on insects titled Showplace of caterpillars, worms, maggots and flying things (1688). A number of the plates in this work show exotic butterflies. The frontispiece shows two scientists at a table studying butterflies and a number of caterpillars. Scanned copy
- Accurate Abhandlung von dem Podagra und der lauffenden Gicht / Worinnen deren wahre Ursachen und gewisse Cur gründlich vorgestellet, auch die herrlichen Kräfften der Milch / . beschrieben werden durch Steph. Blancard. Anietzo aber wegen seiner Nutzbarkeit / nebst des Herrn Wilhelm ten Rhyne curieuser Beschreibung, wie die Chinesen und Japaner vermittelst des Moxa-Brennens und guldenen Nadel-Stechens alle Kranckheiten, insonderheit aber das Podagra gewiß curiren. Aus der Niederteutschen in die hochteutsche Sprache übersetzet. Leipzig, Fr. Gelditsch, 1692.
- Den Nederlandschen herbarius, Amsterdam, 1698.
- The physical dictionary : Wherein the terms of anatomy, the names and causes of diseases, chyrurgical instruments and their use; are accurately describ’d. : Also the names and virtues of medicinal plants, minerals, stones, gums, salts, earths, &c. and the method of choosing the best drugs : the terms of chymistry, and of the apothecaries art; and the various forms of medicines, and the ways of compounding them. First published in 1684, reprints in 1693, 1697, 1702, 1708, 1715, 1726
- Opera Medica, theoretica, practica et clinica. Leiden (1701)
- Lexicon medicum renovatum. Vol. 1 & 2. Overbeke, Lovanii (Editio novissima & ob Additiones / a Viro celeberrimo Joanne Henr. Schulzio) 1754 – digital edition by the University and State Library Düsseldorf
- Arzneiwissenschaftliches Wörterbuch : worin nicht nur die Kunstwörter, sondern auch die in der Zergliederungskunst, Wundarzneikunst, Apothekerkunst, Schneidekunst, Gewächskunde u.s.w. gebräuchlichsten Ausdrücken deutlich, bestimt und kurz erklärt werden. Wucherer, Wien 1788 – digital edition by the University and State Library Düsseldorf
  - (1788).
  - (1788).
  - (1788).
