= Leona Constantia =

17th-century alchemist and author

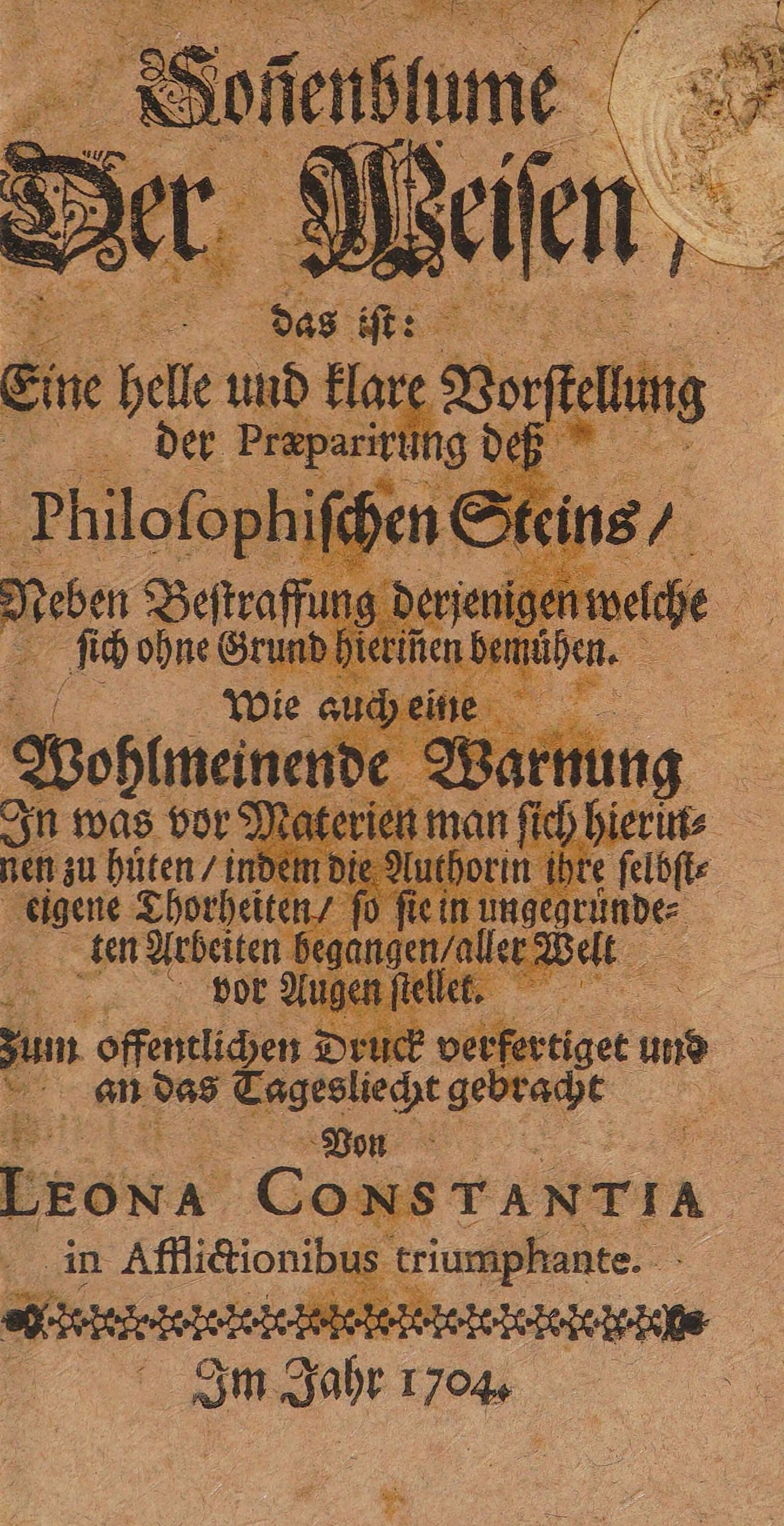
Title page of Sonnenblume der Weisen from the copy in the Wellcome Collection

Leona Constantia was a 17th-century alchemist and author. She wrote the alchemical treatise, Sonnenblume der Weisen (The Sunflower of the Wise), which appears to have been first published in 1704.

Her 136 page book offers instructions for preparing the philosopher's stone, along with ethical warnings and admissions of the author's "errors".

Scottish chemist John Ferguson, in his 1906 Bibliotheca Chemica, indicates that Constantia was a pseudonym of English mystic Jane Leade (1623–1704), but also notes that none of Leade's other publications dealt with chemistry. An essay published in the 1794 Hermetischen ABC also identifies her as Leade. In the 18th century, Johann Friedrich Henkel (1678–1744) and Johann Friedrich Gmelin (1748–1804) agreed that she was from Clermont in central France, with Henkel identifying her as a baroness. More recently, researchers have conjectured that she was Sophie Elisabeth von Clermont.

In 2026, German artist Anselm Kiefer included a painting of Constantia in his collection, The Women Alchemists, which was displayed in Milan's Sala delle Cariatidi as part of the cultural showcase of the 2026 Winter Olympics.
