= Elizabeth Poole (prophetess) =

English prophetess and writer

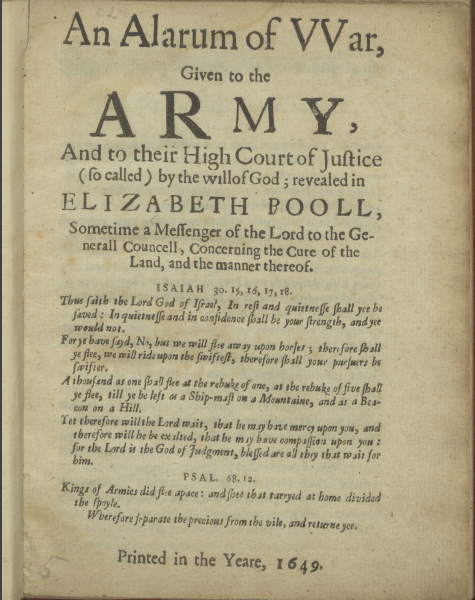
- "An Alarum of War..."
- Born: Elizabeth Poole; 1622? England
- Died: in or after 1668; England
- Occupations: prophet, writer
- Relatives: Robert Poole (father)
- Writing career
- Language: English
- Notable works: An Alarum of War, Another Alarum of War

Elizabeth Poole (bap.1622?, d. in or around 1668) was a prophetess and writer.

== Biography ==
Around the age of sixteen, she became a follower of William Kiffin (1616-1701) and joined the Particular Baptist sect for a period of about ten years. During the political events in London known as the "Pride's Purge" Poole argued against the execution of King Charles I of England (1600-1649). She played a role as prophet to and mediator between the Council of Officers and Levellers, advising them against regicide. Her delivery of a vision to the council on December 29, 1648 inspired John Lilburne (1614-1657), an English political Leveller, to present a petition A Plea for Common-Right and Freedom arguing for the conversion of the council to a national executive body. She is known for two pamphlets An Alarum of War (1649) and Another Allarum of War (1649) written in defence of her prophecy after the king's execution was passed. Her publications include a restatement of her ability to prophesy despite her mistakes. They include a letter from "Thomasine Pendarves a.k.a. "T.P." to the Congregation of Saints to forgive Poole as she beieves that would be God's will.

Baptist minister William Kiffin had written to his fellow minister John Pendarves in Cornwall to suggest that Pendarves should remove Poole from her pulpit. Luckily the letter was intercepted by her friend and his wife Thomasine Pendarves who replied to Kiffen. She told him that his suggestion was ill advised and moreover he should in future write to her as she did not trust her husband to act correctly. Poole later published Thomasine's letter but it is not known if anything resulted from the letter to Kiffen.

== Works ==
- A Vision: Wherein is Manifested the Disease and Cure of the Kingdome. Being the Summe of what was delivered to the Generall Councel of the Army, Decemb. 29. 1648. London, 1648.
- An Alarum of War, given to the Army, and to their High Court of Justice (so called) by the will of God: revealed in Elizabeth Pooll, sometime a messenger of the Lord to the Generall Councell, concerning the cure of the land, and the manner thereof. London, 1649.
- An[other] Alarum of War, given to the Army, and to their High Court of Justice (so called) by the will of God: revealed in Elizabeth Pooll, sometime a messenger of the Lord to the Generall Councell, concerning the cure of the land, and the manner thereof... London, 1649.
- A Prophesie Touching the Death of King Charles. London, 1649.

== Sources ==
- Brod, Manfred. "Politics and prophecy in seventeenth century," Albion, 31 (1999): 395-413.
- Brod, Manfred. Dissent and dissenters in early modern Berkshire. D. Phil. University of Oxford, 2002.
- Font, Carme. Women's prophetic writings in seventeenth century Britain. Abingdon, Oxon; New York, NY: Routledge, 2017.
- Gillespie, Katharine. Domesticity and Dissent in the Seventeenth Century: English Women Writers and the Public Sphere. Cambridge: Cambridge University Press, 2004.
- Wiseman, Susan. Conspiracy and virtue: women, writing, and politics in seventeenth century England. Oxford; New York: Oxford University Press, 2006.
