= Hendrik Jansen van Barrefelt =

Dutch writer

Hendrik Jansen van Barrefelt (c. 1520 – c. 1594) was a weaver, a Christian mystic and the author of several spiritual works using the pseudonym Hiël.

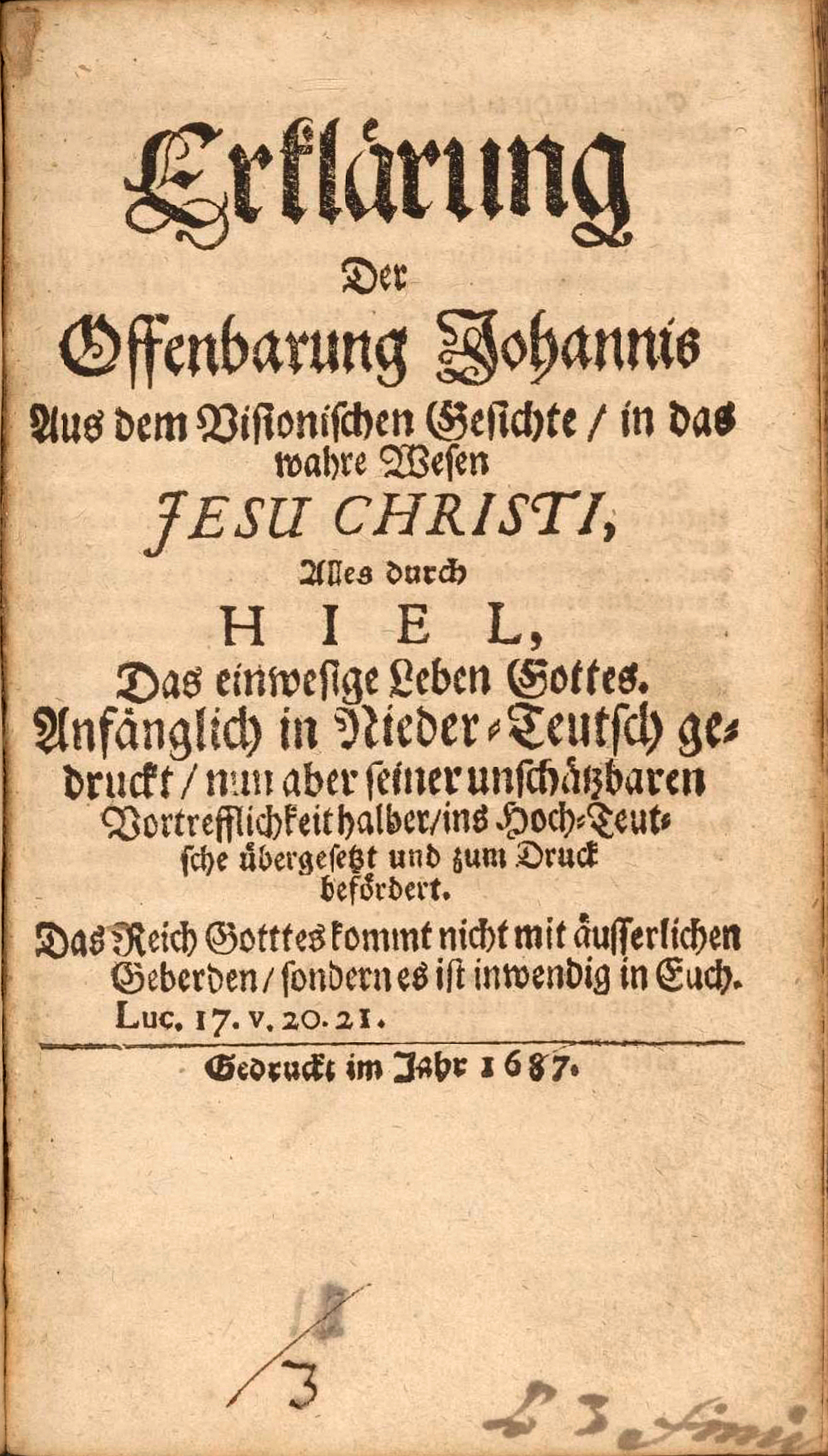
Erklärung Der Offenbarung Johannis, by Hiël, printed in 1687, The Ritman Library, Bibliotheca Philosophica Hermetica, Amsterdam

== Life ==
Hendrik Jansen van Barrefelt was born c. 1520 in Barneveld, Netherlands and died in or after 1594 in Cologne. He married around 1550 and had several children. A former adherent of Menno Simons, the Anabaptist religious leader, Van Barrefelt became a follower of Hendrik Niclaes and joined the Family of Love. However, in 1573 Hendrik van Barrefelt had a vision and from this moment on he called himself "Hiël" (the uniform life of God). Shortly after this vision he broke with Niclaes and began to write his own works. His followers called themselves Hiëlists (lovers of the truth). Christophe Plantin, a well-known humanist, book printer and publisher in Antwerp and Leiden, also broke with Niclaes and became a follower and the central figure around Hiël.

== Works ==
The emphasis of Hiël’s works was on the search for Christ in the soul, an inward interpretation of the Scriptures and an opposition to the visible church. As a result they attracted people with a personal and conciliatory spirituality who had very little with the services and ceremonies of the established churches, but at the same time had no wish to change from one confession to another.

== Publication ==
=== Antwerp, Leiden and Cologne ===
Around 1580 Hiël’s writings began to appear and were printed in Antwerp and Leiden by Christophe Plantin. Around 1582 Hiël initiated two series of engravings for pictorial Bibles (Imagines et figurae Bibliorum), because he believed that the contemplation of biblical images would bring people closer to God. For this purpose he asked Pieter van der Borcht (1530-1608) to make two sets of illustrations of biblical stories for which Hiël wrote the explanatory texts. The Latin version was published in 1582 by Jacobus Vilanus, a pseudonym of Christophe Plantin. After the death of Plantin other books by Hiël were printed by Augustijn van Hasselt in Cologne. In 1687 Jacob Clausen published the complete works of Hiël in a German translation which were very successful in Pietist circles.

=== London ===
As from 1657 Hiël’s works began to appear in England. The first English translation called The Spiritual Journey of A Young Man towards the Land of Peace was printed in 1659 and sold by Giles Calvert, a prominent printer in London who specialized in spiritual literature. The German translation of Hiël’s works of 1687 was read by the Behmenist William Law and his circle of friends interested in mysticism. As a result of this Hiël was to become considered as a precursor of Jakob Böhme. The great admiration which William Law had for Hiël appears from the letter of Thomas Langcake to a friend, dated 30 November 1782, which said:

Mr. Law said to me [of … Protestant Mystics] that Jacob Behmen was the first in Excellency, Hiël the next, and in the third place the Quakers … tho' the deep mystic writers of the Romish Church surpassed them in their exceeding Love of God and Divine Wisdom.

On the title page of the Erklärung der Offenbarung Johannis Hiël wrote "The Kingdom of God cometh not with observation/The Kingdom of God is within you." (Luke 17:20-21). This idea is expressed by William Law in The Spirit of Prayer (1749):

God, the only Good of all intelligent Natures, is not an absent or distant God, but is more present in and to our souls, than our own Bodies.

The prominent 17th century French mystic and Christian philosopher Pierre Poiret (1646-1719) dedicated a chapter to Hiël in his Lettre sur les Auteurs Mystiques.
