= Christopher Fowler (minister) =

English ejected minister

Christopher Fowler (1610–1678) was an English ejected minister.

== Life ==
He was the son of John Fowler, and was born at Marlborough, Wiltshire, about 1610. He entered Magdalen College, Oxford, as a servitor in 1627, and graduated B.A. on 9 February 1632. Moving to St. Edmund Hall, he graduated M.A. on 29 October 1634. To John Prideaux he owed a strong attachment to Reformed theology. He took holy orders, and was a Puritan preacher in and about Oxford, until he obtained a living at West Woodhay, Berkshire, before 1641.

On the surrender of Reading (26 April 1643), Thomas Bunbury, vicar of St. Mary's, joined King Charles in Oxford; his living was sequestered and given to Fowler. He took the covenant (1643), and was a strong presbyterian cause. Thinking himself unsafe in the neighbourhood of the royalist troops at Donnington Castle in Berkshire, garrisoned for the king at the time of the second battle of Newbury (27 October 1644), Fowler went to London. Here his preaching attracted a crowd of hearers, and Anthony Wood suggested that he was at this time preacher at St Margaret's, Lothbury; it seems, however, from other sources that he first obtained an appointment at Albourne, Sussex, and was at St Margaret's from about 1652. In 1649 Fowler refused to take the engagement; but he was later made a fellow of Eton College.

Fowler was an assistant to the commissioners for Berkshire, appointed under the ordinance of 28 August 1654, for ejecting scandalous ministers. In this capacity he was mixed up with the proceedings against John Pordage, formerly of St Laurence's Church, Reading, whom the commissioners ejected (by order 8 December 1654, to take effect 2 February 1655) from the rectory of Bradfield, Berkshire. Fowler wrote an account and defence of this business, in which he and John Tickel, presbyterian minister at Abingdon, had taken a leading part. Somewhat later he entered the debates against the Quakers. With Simon Ford, vicar of St. Laurence's, Reading, he published (1656) an answer to the 'quaking doctrines' of Thomas Speed of Bristol; and he engaged in controversy (1659) with Edward Burrough.

On the restoration of the monarchy Fowler lost his fellowship at Eton, but retained the Reading vicarage till he was ejected by the Act of Uniformity 1662. He then moved to London, was successively at Kennington and Southwark, and exercised his ministry in private. He was an interpreter of prophecy and chronologist; according to Wood, Fowler was later considered somewhat crazed, but William Cooper praised him.

A warrant was out for his apprehension as a conventicle preacher at the time of his death. He died in Southwark in January 1678, and was buried within the precincts of St. John the Baptist, Dowgate Hill. Cooper preached his funeral sermon.

== Works ==
He published:

- Dæmonium Meridianum, 1655, an account of the proceedings against Pordage, who had already published his own account, 1654; with appendix in reply to Pordage's Innocency Appearing, 1655.
- Dæmonium Meridianum. The Second Part, 1656, in reply to Pordage's Truth Appearing, 1655, and a tract entitled The Case of Reading, 1656; appendices on infant baptism in answer to John Pendarves, and on the Reading case addressed to the municipal authorities.
- A Sober Answer to an angry Epistle … by Thomas Speed, 1656, by Fowler and Simon Ford; Speed replied to these and another adversary in The Guilty-Covered Clergyman, 1657).
- A True Charge in Ten Particulars against the people called Quakers [1659]. Thids does not seem to have been separately printed; it is handled in A Discovery, 1659, by Edward Burrough, and is reprinted in Burrough's Works, 1672.
- Sermon on John xix. 42, 1666, mentioned by Wood, but not seen by him; the date seems to show that Fowler was one of those nonconformists who resumed their ministry after the Great Fire of London in defiance of the law, giving a little support to theory that Fowler founded the presbyterian congregation which met in a wooden structure at Unicorn Yard, Tooley Street.

Also a sermon in the Morning Exercise at Cripplegate, 1674–6, and another in the Morning Exercise against Popery preached in Southwark, 1675.
