= Simon Ford (divine) =

English divine

- Born: 1619; East Ogwell (near Newton Bushel, Devon)
- Died: 7 April 1699 (aged 79–80); Old Swinford
- Occupation: Preacher

Simon Ford (1619?–1699), was an English divine.

== Biography ==
Simon Ford, son of Richard Ford, was born at East Ogwell, near Newton Bushel, Devon, around 1619. He was educated at the grammar schools of Exeter and Dorchester, and entered Magdalen Hall, Oxford, in 1636. He was lineally related to Nicholas Wadham, the founder of Wadham College, but failed to obtain a scholarship there. In 1641 he proceeded to attain his B.A., and was expelled from Oxford soon afterwards on account of his strong Puritan leanings .

When the parliamentary visitors were sent to Oxford in 1647, Ford returned and was received with honour. He attained his M.A. on 12 December 1648, was made a delegate of the visitors in 1649, and was given his B.D. "by dispensation, of the delegates" on 16 February 1649–50. His friend, Dr. Edward Reynolds, who had become dean of Christ Church, admitted him as a senior student there and he frequently preached at St. Mary's. A sermon delivered against the Engagement of 1651 led to the removal of his studentship.

He became lecturer of Newington Green, London, and later was vicar of St. Lawrence, Reading 1651-1659. There he engaged in much local controversy. In an assize sermon preached in 1654 he denounced the people of Reading for their support of extravagant religious views, and was called before the grand jury to explain his conduct. Two years later a Quaker named Thomas Speed excited his wrath. Ford and Christopher Fowler, another Reading clergyman, published jointly A Sober Answer to an Angry Epistle ... written in haste by T. Speed in London, 1656, to which Speed replied in The Guilty-covered Clergyman unvailed in 1656.

In July 1659, Ford left Reading to become vicar of All Saints, Northampton. On 30 January 1661 he preached at Northampton against "the horrid actual murtherers of Charles I". In 1665 he proceeded to gain his D.D. at Oxford. On 30 March 1670 he was chosen to be minister of Bridewell, London, but resigned the post on becoming vicar of St. Mary, Aldermanbury on 29 December. Failing health compelled him to remove to the rectory of Old Swinford, Worcestershire, which was conferred on him by Thomas Foley on 22 May 1676.

Simon Ford died at Old Swinford 7 April 1699, and was buried in his church on 10 Alpril 1699. His first wife, Ann Thackham, died 21 February 1667. They had at least five children. He then married Martha Stampe of Reading with a licence granted 13 August 1672, having at least one child. Martha Ford died 13 November 1684 and was buried two days later. His will makes reference to his third wife, Catherine. Simon Ford is recorded as having married Katherine Grove on 16 September 1686 at Alveley. He was survived by his daughters Mary Hercy and Martha Milward.

== Works ==
1. Ambitio Sacra. Conciones duæ Latine habitæ ad Academicos Oxon, Oxford, 1650.
2. Two Dialogues concerning Infant Baptism, the first published in 1654 and the two together in 1656, with a commendatory preface by the Rev. Thomas Blake of Tamworth.
3. The Spirit of Bondage and Adoption largely and practically handled, together with a Discourse on the Duty of Prayer in an Afflicted Condition, London, 1655.
4. A Sober Answer [see above], London, 1656.
5. A Short Catechism declaring the practical use of the Covenant interest of Baptism of the Infant Seed of Believers, London, 1657, an epitome of No. 2.
6. Three Poems relating to the late dreadful Destruction of the City of London by Fire . . . entitled : I. Conflagratio Londinensis [in Latin hexameters with English translation in heroic verse]; II. Londini quod reliquum [in Latin elegiacs with English translation]; III. Actio in Londini Incendarios [in Latin hexameters only], London, 1667. The first two parts have separate title-pages. A copy in the Bodleian of the first poem is entitled The Conflagration of London, poetically delineated, and has commendatory manuscript verses by John Mill addressed to Thomas Barlow (afterwards bishop). A fourth part, Londini renascentis Imago poetica, published in Latin only in 1668, was issued in an English translation in 1669. In its Latin form it is sometimes bound up with the three earlier poems.
7. Carmen Funebre ex occasione Conflagrations Northamptonæ, 20 Sept. an. 1675 conflagrate, concinnatum, London, 1676; republished in an English translation by F. A., M.A., as The Fall and Funeral of Northampton in 1677.
8. A Plain and Profitable Exposition of, and Enlargement upon, the Church Catechism, London, 1684, 1686.
9. A new version of the Psalms of David, in metre, London, 1688. Ford also translated two discourses for the first volume of the English version of Plutarch's Morals, London, 1684.

His published sermons are also numerous. They include sermons on the king's return, 1660; on the burial of Elizabeth, wife of Sir James Langham, 1665; on the Duke of York's victory over the Dutch, 1665. A Discourse concerning God's Judgments, London, 1678, was prepared as a preface to James Illingworth's account of "a man" [John Duncalf] "whose hands and legs rotted off in the parish of King's Swynford in Staffordshire, where he died 21 June 1677.'" Both tracts were reissued in 1751 with a notice of the circumstances by William Whiston, "with his reasons for the republication thereof, taken from the Memoirs."

Edward Stillingfleet, bishop of Worcester, wrote a preface for "the substance of two sermons preached by Ford at the performance of publick penance by certain criminals on the Lord's Day, usually called Midlent Sunday, 1696, in the parish church of Old Swinford", London, 1697. A piece of Latin verse by Ford, entitled Piscatro, and dedicated by him to Gilbert Sheldon, was first published in Musarum Anglicanarum Analecta, vol. i. 1721. This was issued in an English verse translation by Tipping Silvester entitled Piscatio, or Angling in Original Poems and Translations: Consisting of the Microscope, Piscatio, Or Angling ... (Oxford, 1733).

Church of England titles
Preceded by Edward Ecclestone	Rector of St Mary's Oldswinford; 1676 –1699	Succeeded by William Hallifax
