= Andrew Michael Ramsay =

Scottish-born writer (1693–1743)

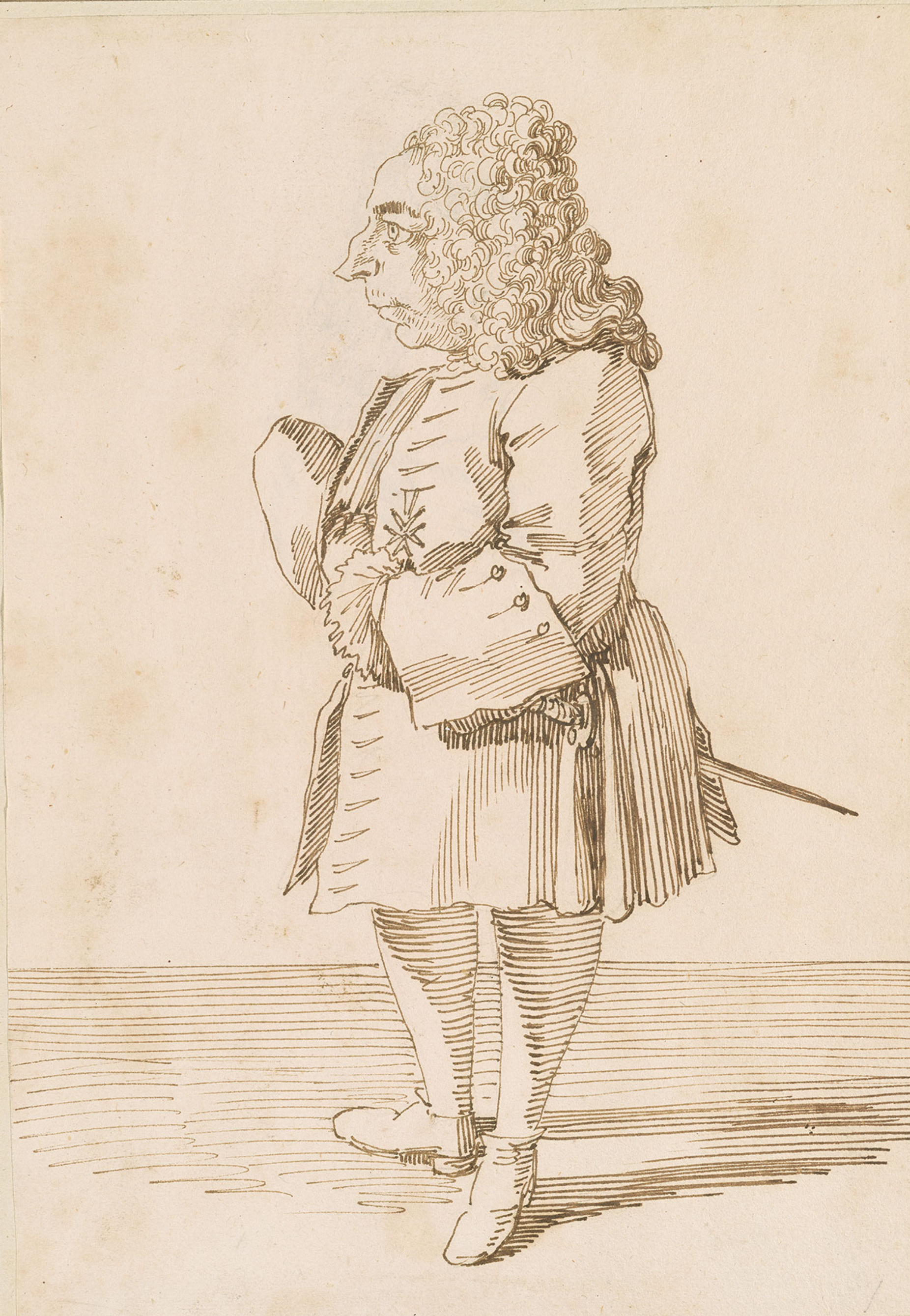
Caricature of Ramsay by Pier Leone Ghezzi likely made during his 1724 stay in Rome.

Sir Andrew Michael Ramsay Bt FRS (9 June 1693 – 6 May 1743), commonly called the Chevalier de Ramsay, was a Scottish-born writer who lived most of his adult life in France. He was a baronet in the Jacobite peerage. After visiting the Catholic archbishop and theologian François Fénelon in Cambrai (France) in 1710, he converted to Roman Catholicism even though he was attracted to quietism. He remained until 1724 in France where he wrote politico-theological treatises. He was in 1724 in Rome in the role of tutor to James Francis Edward Stuart's two sons. He later returned to France. A speech he gave in 1736 in France is considered one of the founding texts of freemasonry in general, and of the French Masonic tradition in particular.

== Biography ==
Ramsay was born in Abbotshall, Fife, Scotland, on 9 June 1693. Son of Alexander Ramsay and Jean Orrock, his parents had him baptized at Abbotshall on 21 June 1693. He probably studied at Edinburgh University. A devout young man, he seemed destined for the ministry in the Church of Scotland, but in 1708 became tutor to the two children of David Wemyss, 4th Earl of Wemyss.

As a youth Ramsay was attracted to the mysticism of quietism as practised in the circle of George Garden at Rosehearty, centred on the teachings of Antoinette Bourignon in a community along the lines of a similar one in Rijnsburg led by Pierre Poiret, where people from different religious persuasions and social castes lived together.

In 1710 Ramsay travelled to Rijnsburg to meet Poiret and later met Jeanne Marie Bouvier de la Motte Guyon known as Mme Guyon. From there he went on to stay with the Catholic archbishop and theologian François Fénelon in Cambrai, in 1710 (August 1710). He remained in Fénelon's household for several years and became steady friends with the Marquis de Fénelon, a young relative of the archbishop and an ardent pupil of Mme Guyon. He wrote his Vie de Fénelon in loyal testimony to that period. From 1714 until 1716, Ramsay acted as secretary to Mme Guyon and he was present at Blois on 9 June 1717 when she died.

Although Ramsay himself was converted to Catholicism by Fénelon, conversion was not deemed an option by Mme Guyon, who strongly advised the community around her to stick to the principles of their proper faith while meditating on Pure Love. In his Life of Fénelon (London, 1723) Ramsay stated his own insights of how Mme Guyon's system had affected him. Association with Fénelon, who as preceptor of the grandsons of Louis XIV had retained huge influence at Court, caused Ramsay to be remarked by the nobility, in particular by the Comte de Sassenage, whose son he tutored from 1718 till 1722.

In 1722 Ramsay became active in high level negotiations over a tax on assets of Jacobite exiles proposed by the British government. By then Ramsay was already well acquainted with Cardinal Fleury, who after the death of the Regent Philippe II, Duke of Orléans (1723) was to be the power of state behind Louis XV.

In 1723 Ramsay was knighted into the Order of St. Lazarus of Jerusalem, which had originated as a Crusader military order based in France for the protection of pilgrims. In 1724 he entered the Jacobite household in Rome. Court intrigue and the impracticability of his educational task – Bonnie Prince Charlie was only three-and-a-half years old – caused him to return to Paris in the same year.

From 1725 till 1728 he stayed as an invited guest at the Hôtel de Sully under the patronage of Maximilien de Béthune, Duc de Sully, the husband of the widowed Comtesse de Vaux (daughter of Mme Guyon). During this period he was an active member of the Club de l'Entresol, an early modern think tank in Paris, in the company of such luminaries as Rene-Louis Argenson, Lord Bolingbroke and Montesquieu. Against that background he wrote his Travels of Cyrus in 1727, which made him a best-selling author in his time, and for the revised edition of which he travelled to London (1729–30) where he was again in touch with Montesquieu.

Both were elected Fellows of the Royal Society in December 1729. In 1730 Ramsay became a member of the Spalding Gentlemen's Society in Lincolnshire, a club in correspondence with the Society of Antiquaries of London. Prominent members had included Sir Isaac Newton, John Gay and Alexander Pope. Still another honour was conferred on Ramsay in 1730: the Honorary Degree of Doctor of Civil Law at Oxford University.

Prior to the conference of the academical titles (and a part of his Life of Fénelon and Travels of Cyrus) Ramsey had been remarked in the intellectual circles of his time. The influential Mémoires de Trévoux published several of his tracts – in 1732, his introduction to the mathematical work of Edmund Stone – and remained favourable throughout to his philosophical contributions. In 1719 he had published an Essai de Politique, revised in 1721 as Essai philosophique sur le gouvernement, où l'on traite de la nécessité, de l'origine, des droits, des bornes et des différentes formes de souveraineté, selon les principes de feu M.François de Salignac de la Mothe Fénelon, archevèque-duc de Cambray and published in English translation in 1722. This work supported the restoration of James Francis Edward Stuart to the British throne, and the removal of the House of Commons in favour of an aristocratic senate advising the king. A number of its key ideas are repeated both in the Life of Fénelon and The Travels of Cyrus, although Ramsay was later to embrace the necessity of the king's rule through Parliament in his Plan of Education for a Young Prince (1732). The Travels of Cyrus promulgated the view that Britain should create a world trading empire and become the 'Capital of the Universe'.

Ramsay returned to France in 1730 and, following the death of the Duc de Sully, passed into the service of the Comte d'Évreux (the original patron of the Elysée Palace), a prominent member of the family of la Tour d'Auvergne and Bouillon which had ties of marriage with the Jacobite Court, through Charlotte, the elder sister of Queen Clementina (Maria Klementyna Sobieska), and bonds of loyal friendship to the circle around Fénelon, through the Cardinal de Bouillon. It was the Cardinal de Bouillon who is said to have had the inspiration of having the family descend from Godfrey of Bouillon, thus making the Crusader King of Jerusalem the totem rather than the genetic precursor of the family (Henderson, 1952).

Ramsay's task in the Évreux household was to tutor a nephew, Godefroy Géraud, duc de Chateau-Thierry, son of the elder brother, Emanuel Theodose de la Tour d'Auvergne, Duc de Bouillon; shifting upon the death of Géraud to the tutorial of the Count's grand nephew, the Prince of Turenne, Godefroi Charles, son of Charles Godefroi, Duc de Bouillon, the head of the house.

It was for the Prince's education that Ramsay wrote the Histoire du Vicomte de Turenne, maréchal général des armées du roy (1735), using as documentary evidence (authorised by James Francis Edward Stuart) the handwritten Mémoires du Duc d'York (James II). These were the Memoirs of James II discovered by David Hume in the Scots College in Paris in 1763 in the company of Michael Ramsay, the nephew of the Chevalier. The manuscripts were lost in the French Revolution.

In June 1735 Ramsay married Marie Nairne (1701–1761), the daughter of Sir David Nairne, undersecretary to James III. For the occasion the Chevalier Ramsay was created a Scottish Knight and Baronet (23 March 1735) with remainder to heirs male. He had issue, a son and a daughter, but his son (1737–1740) died in infancy, and his daughter (1739–1758) from smallpox at the age of 19.

Ramsay lived until 1743 under the benevolent protection of the house of Bouillon, in St. Germain-en Laye, writing and studying, but above all preparing his magnum opus: Philosophical Principles of Natural and Revealed Religion, edited after his death (1748–49) by his wife and friends. The second part of this was, in Ramsay's words, "a history of the human mind in all ages, nations and religions concerning the most divine and important truths". Some "Chinese Letters" written by Ramsay remained unpublished.

== Freemasonry ==
Ramsay was associated with Freemasonry from its introduction in France (1725–26). Charles Radclyffe, Earl of Derwentwater, who acted as Grand Master for France beginning in 1736, was present at Ramsay's funeral. It is presumed that Ramsay's being a Mason facilitated his introduction into the Gentleman's Club of Spalding, of which the prominent Masonic propagator John Theophilus Desaguliers was then also a member.

In 1736 Ramsay pronounced in Paris a public speech which defined the four qualities to become a French Freemason: philanthropy, moral values, secrecy, and empathy for sciences and fine arts.

In 1737 Ramsay wrote his Discourse pronounced at the reception of Freemasons by Monsieur de Ramsay, Grand Orator of the Order, in which he connected Freemasonry with the Knights Hospitaller. His own stature as a Knight of St. Lazarus of Jerusalem may have inspired him, or perhaps even his zeal to propagate an alleged tradition linked to the house of Bouillon. In any case Ramsay thought his speech worthy of note by the prevailing religious authority, and he sent the text to Cardinal Fleury, asking for a Church blessing of the principles of Freemasonry as he had stated them: "The obligations imposed upon you by the Order are to protect your brothers by your authority, to enlighten them by your knowledge, to edify them by your virtues, to succour them in their necessities, to sacrifice all personal resentment, and to strive after all that may contribute to peace and unity of society."

To a Church already in difficulty over the deviating principles of the Society of Jesus, not perhaps the cited reference, but the concept of Masonic ritual was entirely preposterous. To Ramsay's letter of 20 March 1737 came Cardinal Fleury's reply at the end of March interdicting all Masonic reunions.

It is repeatedly held, erroneously, that Ramsay mentioned the Knights Templar in his Discourse, when in fact he mentioned the Knights Hospitaller. However, perceptive listeners may have understood his mention of the Crusader knights to be an indirect reference to the Knights Templar, the memory of whom was still controversial in France and may have led to the Pope's indictment of the Masonic fraternity a year later.

== Bibliography ==
Ramsay's works include:

- Les voyages de Cyrus (London, 1728; Paris, 1727): Engl. 'The travels of Cyrus to which is annexe'd a discourse upon the theology & mythology of the pagans' – a book composed in avowed imitation of Fenelon's ''Les avantures de Télémaque''.
- He also edited Télémaque itself (Paris, 2 volumes, 1717) with an introduction
- A Histoire de la vie et des ouvrages de Fenelon (The Hague, 1723).
- A partial biography of Henri de la Tour d'Auvergne, Vicomte de Turenne (Paris, 1735)
- Poems in English (Edinburgh, 1728), and other miscellaneous works.

== Works cited ==
- Cherel, Albert. 1917. "André Michel Ramsay – Sa vie" =Chpt II in Fénelon au XVIIIe siècle en France. Paris: Librairie Hachette ed.
- Cherel, Albert. 1926. "Un aventurier religieux au XVIIIe sciècle, André Michel Ramsay" Paris: Perrin.
- George David Henderson. 1952. Chevalier Ramsay. London: Thomas Nelson and Sons.
- Dupriez, Bernard. 1965. Fénelon: Écrits Spirituels – Extaits. Paris: Nouveaux Classiques Larousse.
- Andrew Mansfield. 2015. Ideas of monarchical reform: Fénelon, Jacobitism and the political works of the Chevalier Ramsay. Manchester: Manchester University Press - http://www.manchesteruniversitypress.co.uk/9780719088377/
