= A Fountain of Gardens =

A Fountain of Gardens was a spiritual diary written by Jane Leade, who helped found the Philadelphian Society.
