= Pierre Poiret =

French mystic

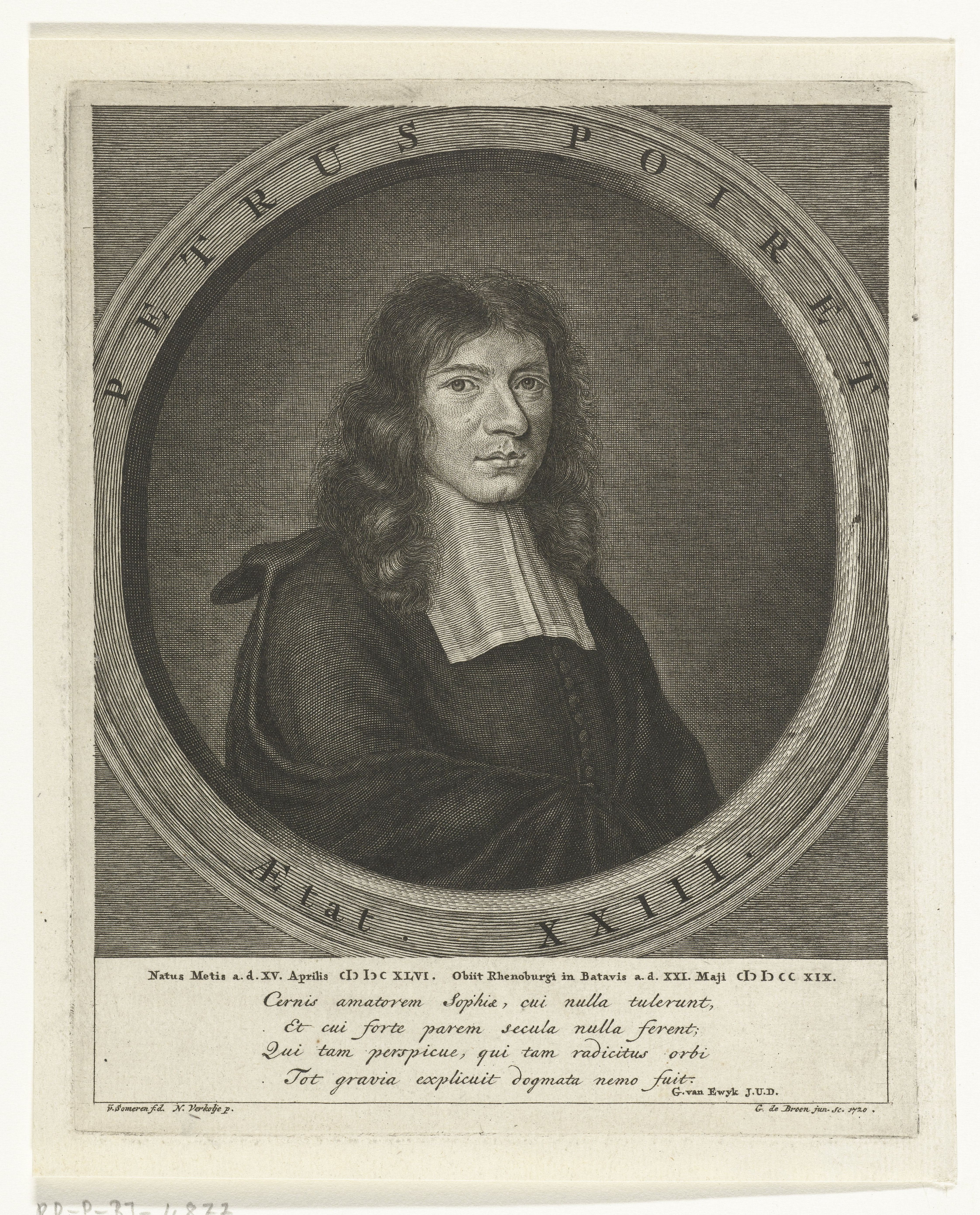
Pierre Poiret

Pierre Poiret Naudé (15 April 1646 – 21 May 1719) was a prominent French mystic and Christian philosopher. He was born in Metz and died in Rijnsburg.

== Life and accomplishments ==
After the early death of his parents, he supported himself by the engraver's trade and the teaching of French, at the same time studying theology, in Basel, Hanau, and, after 1668, Heidelberg. At Basel he was captivated by Descartes' philosophy, which never quite lost its hold on him. He read also Thomas à Kempis and Tauler, but was especially influenced by the writings of the Dutch Mennonite mystic Hendrik Jansen van Barrefelt (c. 1520 - c. 1594), whose works were published under the pseudonym of Hiël.

In 1672 he became pastor of the French church at Annweiler in the duchy of Deux-Ponts. Here he became acquainted with Elisabeth, abbess of Herford, the granddaughter of James I of England and a noted mystic, with the Theologia Germanica, and with the writings of Antoinette Bourignon, which last supplied exactly what he wanted. He was also a warm admirer of Jane Leade.

His desire to meet Bourignon took him to the Netherlands in 1676. He settled in Amsterdam, and in the following year he published his Cogitationes rationales de Deo, anima, et Malo. This gained him an immediate reputation for scholarship and philosophic insight. It is Cartesian in form; the Trinity is conceived in mathematical terms; all knowledge is to rest on evidence - but the end of this knowledge of God is practical, to lead distracted Christendom back to unity. The influence of Thomas à Kempis and Tauler is plainly visible.

From the Netherlands Poiret went on to Hamburg, still in quest of Antoinette Bourignon. He was completely over won by her at their first meeting, and until her death in 1680, he was her faithful disciple. He accompanied her in her wanderings, and traveled several times as far as Holstein in connection with her affairs. He collected her writings in 19 volumes (Amsterdam, 1679–1686), and he also published her biography in 2 volumes (1679). He prefixed a thoroughgoing defense of her and added a translation of the Göttliche Gesicht of Hans Engelbrecht, the Brunswick enthusiast, to her writings. He defended her character and divine mission in a Mémoire touchant la vie de Mlle. A. Bourignon (1679), and championed her cause against Bayle and Seckendorf.

In 1688 he settled at Rijnsburg, where he busied himself on his own works and in multifarious labors for the Dutch booksellers, such as in the Dutch edition of Thierry Ruinart.

Pierre Poiret had multiple similarities to dispensationalism and has been said to have been the first theologian to develop a fully Dispensationalist system. He taught that history should be organized into multiple dispensations in which God works with humans in different ways, including the millennium as a future dispensation. Pierre also held to a future restoration of the nation of Israel.

== Summary of his writings ==
His writings include;

- Cogitationes rationales de Deo, anima, et Malo (1677)
- L'Économie divine, ou système universel et démontré des oeuvres et des desseins de Dieu envers les hommes (Amsterdam, 1687)
- Theology of the Heart
- La Paix des ames dans tous les partis du Christianisme (1687)
- De erudition, solida, superfciaria et falsa (1692)
- The true principles of the Christian education of children (1695)
- Bibliotheca mysticorum selecta (1708)

The L'Économie divine, ou système universel et démontré des oeuvres et des desseins de Dieu envers les hommes (Amsterdam, 1687; Eng. transl., The Divine Œconomy, 6 vols., London, 1713), which purports to reproduce the visionary notions of Antoinette Bourignon, but at least gives them an intelligible and consistent form. His La Paix des ames dans tous les partis du Christianisme (1687), disregards the formal creeds of the various churches, and appeals to the minority of really sincere Christians, urging them to an inner union without the abandonment of their external affiliations. In De erudition, solida, superfciaria et falsa (1692), he distinguishes between superficial knowledge of the names of things and real or solid knowledge of the things themselves, which latter is to be attained by humble renunciation of one's own wisdom and will. He continued to make contributions to the philosophical and religious controversies of the time, as, for example, against Bayle and his "hypocritical" opposition to Spinoza. The work which probably ran through the most editions was the little treatise on the education of children which first appeared in 1690 a collection of his shorter writings: was frequently translated, and influenced the Pietistic controversy at Hamburg. His most permanently valuable contribution was Bibliotheca mysticorum selecta (1708), which displays an astonishing acquaintance with ancient and modern mystics, and contains valuable information on some of the less-known writers.

He also published a large number of mystical writings both from the Middle Ages and from the French Pietists of the seventeenth century. In 1704 he brought out a new edition of Mme. Guyon's writings, with the addition of a treatise printed for the first time and an introduction. In spite of his devotion to her, he was not a Quietist in the ordinary sense of the word. He would not have man's relation to God one of pure passivity but of receptivity. He repudiated predestination, and condemned Pelagianism because it suppressed the feeling of inherent sinfulness in man - just as he opposed Socinianism because it did not ascribe the whole of salvation to the operation of God's grace. Mystic as he was, he knew how to combine with his own peculiar attitude a firm insistence on certain dogmatic definitions, such as that of the Trinity. He continually appealed to the authority of Scripture.

Though after 1680 he led a quiet and retired life, he was recognized widely by the scholars of his time, such as Thomasius and Bayle, Jean Le Clerc and Walch, as a man of great learning; and his zealous participation in the cause of Antoinette Bourignon did not injure his good name as a devout mystic and an honorable man. His influence persisted after his death, through the work of his spiritual son Tersteegen. It also survived through the respect which his writings won for mysticism, forcing the regular theology, as represented by Le Clerc, Lange, Buddeus, Walch, and Johann Friedrich Stapfer, to take account of it.

== See also ==
- Christian mystics
- Andrew Michael Ramsay
