= Antoinette Bourignon =

17th-century French-Flemish mystic

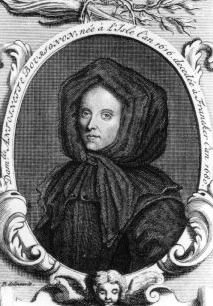
- Born: Antoinette Bourignon; 13 January 1616; Lille, Flanders
- Died: 30 October 1680 (aged 64); Franeker, Friesland

Antoinette Bourignon de la Porte (13 January 1616 – 30 October 1680) was a French-Flemish mystic and adventurer. She taught that the end times would come soon and that the Last Judgment would then fall. Her belief was that she was chosen by God to restore true Christianity on earth and became the central figure of a spiritual network that extended beyond the borders of the Dutch Republic, including Holstein and Scotland. Bourignon's sect belonged to the spiritualist movements that have been characterized as the "third power".

== Early years ==
Antoinette was born to a family of wealthy Catholic merchants in Lille in 1616. She was born with a severe cleft lip and palate, and initially "it was debated whether her life was worth preserving", although a subsequent surgery completely removed the birth defect. By her own account, she was attracted to religion from an early age, lecturing her parents on religion as young as five.

== Career ==
In 1636, she fled a marriage her father had arranged for her, but was brought back home shortly after. After eighteen months at home, she left to form an ascetic community at Mons, the first of many attempts in her life to create a new community around revelations she believed to have been revealed directly to her.

Antoinette would have preferred to have joined a strict religious order, the Discalced Carmelites. In 1653 she founded a girls’ orphanage with inheritance money. In 1662 she fled to Ghent and Mechelen, after the magistrate investigated the harsh regime of the orphanage after one of the girls died there. Bourignon claimed to be in direct connection with God and accused the girls of having a pact with the devil.

Bourignon disliked the lavish splendour of the Catholic Church and wanted to establish a community of what she saw as true Christians. It was her view that only "true Christians" would be saved and Bourignon was - according to her - obliged by God to gather these true Christians. In Mechelen she won her first follower, Christiaan de Cort. De Cort had grand plans to establish a new colony on Nordstrand, an island off the coast of Schleswig-Holstein. There a Roman Catholic community had been established since 1652 consisting of dyke workers from Brabant. In 1667 she moved with De Cort to Amsterdam to attract more sponsors. There she met Jean de Labadie, Comenius and Anna Maria van Schurman and began publishing her writings.

Her intense religiosity, unorthodox views and disregard of all sects drew both persecution and followers. Much of the criticism levelled at her was because she was acting as a spiritual leader of a largely male group, many of them married men. They included merchants, craftsmen, doctors (such as Steven Blankaart), painters, rentiers, clerics and scholars (such as Robert Boyle, who had her work translated into English), and Comenius, who invited her to his deathbed. Subsequently, she gained the support of Jan Swammerdam, who was in a spiritual crisis and did not fully trust her, and the owner of Nyenrode Castle, Johan Ortt.

In 1671, she inherited a portion of the island of Nordstrand, not far from Husum, from De Cort, who left large debts after his death. There, she moved with a few followers and started a commune. She set up a printing press and carried on attracting controversy, calling herself the "new Eve" until her press was confiscated by the local government. She then fled to Husum, in an area then known for its religious tolerance and freedom.

Setting up another printing press, Bourignon and her followers distributed her writings at fairs and annual markets. In 1675 Jan Swammerdam visited the community. He had burned his study of the silkworm on her advice. Swammerdam traveled to Copenhagen to visit the mother of Nicolaus Steno, and immediately returned to Amsterdam. He failed to finish his work The Book of Nature, which was full of mystical poems and phrases.

The community, consisting of six wealthy and educated persons, failed when the only other woman refrained from further service. The printing press was confiscated by the Lutheran government. Bourignon was accused of witchcraft and so hurriedly departed to Hamburg. Her stay there was brief; opposition from the Lutheran clergy there forced her to move to East-Friesland, accompanied by Pierre Poiret. There, she attempted to found a hospital in the outbuildings of a chateau in Lütetsburg. But by then she was losing much of her support and so decided to return to Amsterdam. On her way there, she fell ill and was stranded in Franeker, Friesland, where she died on 30 October 1680.

== Legacy ==
After her death, most of her followers drifted away; a small group remained who edited and circulated her unpublished writings. In 1686, her collected works were published in 19 volumes by the Amsterdam publisher John Wetstein. Finally a large part of her manuscripts ended up at the Aalmoezeniersweeshuis (Orphanage) and the Remonstrant Congregation of Amsterdam through Volckert van de Velde. The entire collection now rests in the library of the University of Amsterdam.

In the early 18th century, her influence was revived in Scotland (see Andrew Michael Ramsay), sufficiently to call forth several denunciations of her doctrines in the various Presbyterian general assemblies of 1701, 1709 and 1710.

== Writings ==
Her writings, containing an account of her life and of her visions and opinions, were collected by her disciple, Pierre Poiret (19 vols, Amsterdam, 1679–1686), who also published her life (2 vols, 1683):

- La vie de Dam^{lle} Antoinette Bourignon. Ecrite partie par elle-méme, partie par une personne de sa connoissance, dans les Traités dont on void le tiltre a la page suivante. Amsterdam: J. Riewerts & P. Arents, 1683. The first volume of the book (pp. 137–223) contains her autobiography up to 1668.

For a critical account see Hauck, Realencylopädie (Leipzig, 1897), and Étude sur Antoinette Bourignon, by M. E. S. (Paris, 1876). Three of her works at least have been translated into English, some by Robert Boyle in an earlier stage:

- An Abridgment of the Light of the World (London, 1786)
- A Treatise of Solid Virtue (1699)
- The Restoration of the Gospel Spirit (1707).

== See also ==
- Jan Swammerdam
