= Abiezer Coppe =

English political writer

Abiezer Coppe (1619 – 1672) was one of the English Ranters and a writer of prophetic religious pamphlets.

== Biography ==
He was born in Warwick on 20 May 1619, and was a pupil of Thomas Dugard at The King's School, Warwick. From there he went to All Souls College, Oxford and also Merton College, Oxford. One of Coppe's major works is the Fiery Flying Roll of 1649, a (highly heretical) tirade against inequality and hypocrisy which vividly evokes the charged and visionary atmosphere that swept over England during the civil war and interregnum.

While Coppe's views were unpopular with Royalists, they were equally disliked by Parliamentarians, and shortly after the Fiery Flying Roll was published he was imprisoned at Newgate Prison in London, and the book burned.

Coppe was later released and celebrated by publishing Coppe's return to the ways of righteousness, in which he retracted his previous heresies, while adding a few more. Like Lodowick Muggleton and the Diggers' leader Gerrard Winstanley, Coppe combined an egalitarian social vision with an apocalyptic religious one.

In 1657 he apparently changed his name to Dr Higham, and was buried under that name at St May's Church, Barnes on 23 August 1672.

== Reception ==
Coppe has been written about by Norman Cohn, M.A. Poultney and the Marxist historians A. L. Morton and Christopher Hill.

He has also been celebrated in modern folk music; there is a folk song about him with the eponymous title Abiezer Coppe on the Leon Rosselson album Love, Loneliness, Laundry, which has since been released on CD on Rosselson's compilation Guess What They're Selling At The Happiness Counter.

In 2018 the band Barnstormer 1649, led by poet Attila the Stockbroker, included a different song about Coppe with the same title on their album Restoration Tragedy.

Coppe appears as a character in Caryl Churchill's 1976 play Light Shining in Buckinghamshire.

== See also ==
- Christian anarchism
- English Dissenters
- Religion in the United Kingdom
