= Jane Leade =

English dissenter (1624–1704)

Jane Leade (née Ward; March 1624 – 19 August 1704) was a Christian mystic born in Norfolk, England, whose spiritual visions, recorded in a series of publications, were central in the founding and philosophy of the Philadelphian Society in London at the time.

== Early life ==
Jane Ward was born in about February or March 1624, the twelfth and youngest child of Hamond Ward, a rich landed gentleman, of Letheringsett Hall, and his wife Mary Calthorpe, a daughter of Sir James Calthorpe of Cockthorpe. She was christened on 9 March 1624 at St Andrew's Church, Letheringsett, Norfolk.

She had a comfortable upbringing in a prosperous family. At the age of fifteen, during a family Christmas party she was gripped by a "sudden grievous sorrow" claimed to have heard an angelic whisper urging her "Cease from this, I have another Dance to lead thee in; for this is Vanity".

Although she vowed to do so, the next phase of her life was outwardly conventional.

On a date unknown but between 15 June and 14 July 1644, Jane Ward married William Leade, a merchant and distant cousin, with a marriage portion from her father of £240 (equivalent to £48,949 in 2025). From 1647 to 1657, and perhaps longer, the couple lived together in Kings Lynn, where William was a freeman of the borough. The marriage was happy, lasted 27 years, and they had four daughters. The marriage was extremely stable, but when William died in 1671 she was left utterly bereft and penniless in the City of London.

It was at this time, however, that she had her first vision of the "Virgin Sophia", who promised to unfold the secrets of the universe to her. Leade declared herself a 'Bride of Christ' and proceeded to transcribe her subsequent visions. Her final output amounted to many volumes of visionary mysticism.

== The Philadelphian Society ==
In 1663 Jane Leade met John Pordage, a Church of England priest who had been ejected from his parish in 1655 but reinstated in 1660 during the English Restoration. In 1668, Leade joined a small English Behmenist group led by Pordage. Leade remained in this group after her husband's death in 1670, and this was when she began keeping her spiritual diary, which would later be published as A Fountain of Gardens. Left nearly destitute after the death of her husband, Leade joined the Pordage household in 1674 and remained there until his death in 1681. Leade assumed leadership of this group after Pordage's death, and in 1694, the group became known as the Philadelphian Society For The Advancement Of Piety And Divine Philosophy (the Philadelphians). Leade's writings and visions formed the core of the group's spiritual goals and ideas. They rejected the idea of being a church, preferring the term society, and none of the members ceased their memberships in existing churches. Together, the group held views that were somewhat similar to Panentheism, regarding the belief in the presence of God in all things, and with a Nondualist component, in that they also believed the presence of the Holy Spirit exists in each and everyone's soul, and that one can become enlightened and illuminated by living a virtuous life and seeking truth through the wisdom of God.

The movement flourished until the early 18th century when, with Leade's death in 1704, its membership began to dwindle. It was briefly revived in 1706 when they held meetings with the French Camisards, and then faded into obscurity. Nevertheless, it had converts in Europe and America. Leade's spiritual and literary legacy can be found in Radical German Pietism, particularly in the Moravians under Nicolaus Ludwig Zinzendorf, in German Romanticism, and in the works of Emanuel Swedenborg, William Law and William Blake. Although no longer officially a functioning group, many of the Philadelphian Society's views and writings, particularly those by Jane Leade, remained influential among certain groups of Behmenists, Pietists, Radical Pietists, Christian mystics, and Esoteric Christians, such as the Society of the Woman in the Wilderness (led by Johannes Kelpius), the Ephrata Cloister, and the Harmony Society, among others.

== The vision ==
Leade's spiritual vision, although very much her own, was similar to that of Jakob Böhme (1575–1624), whose writings influenced John Pordage, the founder of the group which would become the Philadelphian Society under Leade's leadership. Like other female Christian mystics, for example Julian of Norwich, Margery Kemp and Hildegard von Bingen, Leade's spirituality has a strong feminine element, the Sophia, or Wisdom of God, being a recurring subject in her writing.

Her writings cover many of the Christian mysteries: the nature of Christ, the redemption of Man through a return to the Godhead, the existence of the Sophia, the Apocalypse and the possibility of Ascension. The scope of her work has drawn comparisons with Cabala, Gnosticism, Alchemy and Rosicrucianism in her belief in the presence of God in all things (Panentheism) and the existence of the Holy Spirit in each soul (Nondualism).

Around 1694, she became a Christian Universalist, rejecting the "Doctrine that hath been preached of an endless Misery and Torment" which had "wrought little effect in frightening or terrifying 'em from their evil Courses." She believed that punishment after death was purgative, not punitive.

== Works ==
She published:

1. The Heavenly Cloud now Breaking: The Lord Christ's Ascension Ladder sent down; To shew the way to reach the Ascension and Glorification, through the Death and Resurrection, 1681
2. The Revelation of Revelations: Particularly as an Essay Towards the Unsealing, Opening and Discovering the Seven Seals, the Seven Thunders, the New Jerusalem State, the Twelve Gates and the Magical Eye. The which have not hitherto so far been brought forth to light (except to the Spiritual Discerner) to any degree of Satisfaction, as to the understanding of the grand Mystery, 1683
3. The Enochian Walks with God: Found out by a Spiritual Traveller, Whose Face Towards Mount-Sion Above was Set; with an Experimental Account of What was Known, Seen and Met withal There. [A Revelation of the Immense and Infinite Latitude of God's Love, to the Restoring of his Whole Creation, and How, and after what Way and Manner we are to Look, and wait for this Last Appearance, and Coming of our Mighty God, and Saviour Christ Jesus.], 1694
4. The Laws of Paradise: given forth by Wisdom to a Translated Spirit [God reveals further the requirements for those of the High calling of the Nazarites who shall have access to Paradise while still within their mortal bodies.], 1695
5. The Wonders of God's Creation: Manifested in the Variety of Eight Worlds; As they were made known Experimentally to the Author. [A Manifestation Concerning the Eight Worlds or Regions, Allotted to Human Souls; According to their several Degrees of Ascent or Descent.], 1695
6. A Message to the Philadelphian Society: Whithersoever dispersed over the whole Earth. Together with a Call to the Several Gathered Churches among Protestants in this Nation of England, 1696
7. A Second Message to the Philadelphian Society: A further Manifestation Concerning the Virgin Philadelphian Church: Given upon New Year's Day in this Present Year MDCXCVI. Being A Second message to the Philadelphian Society, and a Touchstone to the Gathered Churches, 1696
8. The Tree of Faith: or The Tree of Life, Springing up in the Paradise of God from which All the Wonders of the New Creation, in the Virgin Church of the First-born of Wisdom must proceed, 1696
9. The Ark of Faith: or A supplement to the Tree of Faith, &c. for the Further Confirmation of the same. Together with A Discovery of the New World, 1696
10. A Fountain of Gardens:Volume I (Jane Leade's revealing personal Journal of Spiritual Encounters during the years from 1670 to 1676) Watered by the Rivers of Divine Pleasure, and Springing up in all the Variety of Spiritual Plants; Blown up by the Pure Breath into a Paradise. Sending forth their Sweet Savours, and Strong Odours, for Soul Refreshing, 1696
11. A Revelation of the Everlasting Gospel Message: Which Shall Never Cease to Be Preach'd Till the Hour of Christ's Eternal Judgment Shall Come; Whereby will be Proclaim'd the Last-Love Jubilee, in order to the Restitution of the Whole Lapsed Creation, Whether Human or Angelical. When by the Blood of the Everlasting Covenant, all Prisoners shall be set free, 1697
12. A Fountain of Gardens: Volume II Being a Continuation of the Process of a Life according to Faith, of the Divinely Magical Knowledge, and of the New Creation. In Mutual Entertainments Betwixt The Essential Wisdom, and the Soul in her Progress through Paradise, to Mount Sion, and to the New Jerusalem. (Jane Leade's Journal from 1677), 1697
13. The Messenger of An Universal Peace: A Third Message to the Philadelphian Society including "The Marks of a True Philadelphian", 1698
14. The Ascent to the Mount of Vision: Where many Things were shewn, concerning; I. The First Resurrection; II. The State of Separated Souls; III. The Patriarchal Life; IV. The Kingdom of Christ: With an Account of the Approaching Blessed State of this Nation, 1699
15. The Signs of the Times: Forerunning the Kingdom of Christ and Evidencing when it is Come, 1699
16. The Wars of David and the Peaceable Reign of Solomon: symbolizing the Signs of the Times of Warfare and Refreshment of the Saints of the Most High God to whom a Priestly Kingdom is shortly to be given, after the Order of Melchezideck—consisting of two Treatises entitled: An Alarm to the Holy Warriours to Fight the Battels of the LAMB. The Glory of Sharon in the Renovation of Nature, 1700
17. A Fountain of Gardens: Volume III: Part ONE (Jane Leade's Journal from 1678) A Spiritual Diary of the Wonderful Experiences of a Christian Soul, under the Conduct of the Heavenly Wisdom, 1700
18. A Fountain of Gardens: Volume III: Part TWO (Jane Leade's Journal from 1679 to 1686) A Spiritual Diary of the Wonderful Experiences of a Christian Soul, under the Conduct of the Heavenly Wisdom; Continued from the Year 1679, to the Middle of the Year 1686 (The Last Volume of her Journal), 1701
19. A Living Funeral Testimony: or Death Overcome, and Drown'd, in the Life of Christ. With a Further Description of the Various States of Separated Souls, as to what they may expect will ensue after Death, whether in Christ or out of Christ, 1702

Other works:

20. Sixty Propositions from which was drawn the 1679 Prophecy (Edited and Extracted from, A Message to the Philadelphian Society: Whithersoever dispersed over the whole Earth, 1697)

In addition, some researchers have identified her as the pseudonymous author of Sonnenblume der Weisen, a 1704 alchemical treatise. Scottish chemist John Ferguson, in his 1906 Bibliotheca Chemica, repeats this attribution, but notes that none of Leade's other publications dealt with chemistry.

== See also ==
- Jakob Böhme
- Christian mystics
- Christian mysticism
- Esoteric Christianity
- Behmenism
- Sophia (wisdom)
- English Dissenters
