= Nicholas of Basel =

Prominent member of the Beghard community

Nicholas of Basel (1308 - c. 1395) was a prominent member of the Beghard community, who travelled widely as a missionary and propagated the teachings of his sect.

== Life ==
Nicholas of Basel was born at Basel, Switzerland, in 1308. The son of a rich merchant, he inherited substantial wealth. His life of pleasure was interrupted by a spiritual experience, after which he became a devout religious teacher. Nicholas was called by his followers the "Great Layman" or the "Great Friend of God". This has led to some confusion that he was a leader of the 14th century lay mystical society the Friends of God, although this has been discounted. Nicholas' teachings that, although not ordained, he had the authority to use episcopal and priestly powers, that submission to his direction was necessary for attaining spiritual perfection, and that his followers could not sin even though they committed crimes or disobeyed both Church and pope were at odds with those of the Dominican-inspired Friends of God. His teachings are akin to some of the more radical Beghards and the Brethren of the Free Spirit.

Though vigorously sought after by the Inquisition, he eluded its agents for many years until around 1395, he was seized in Vienna, and burned at the stake as a heretic, together with two of his followers, John and James.

A considerable legend has attached itself to Nicholas through the persistent but mistaken identification of him with the mysterious "Friend of God from the Oberland," the "double" of Rulman Merswin, the Strasbourg banker who was one of the leaders of the 14th-century German mystics known as the Friends of God.

== See also ==
Christian anarchism
