= Sister-books =

Term for group of texts in medieval literature

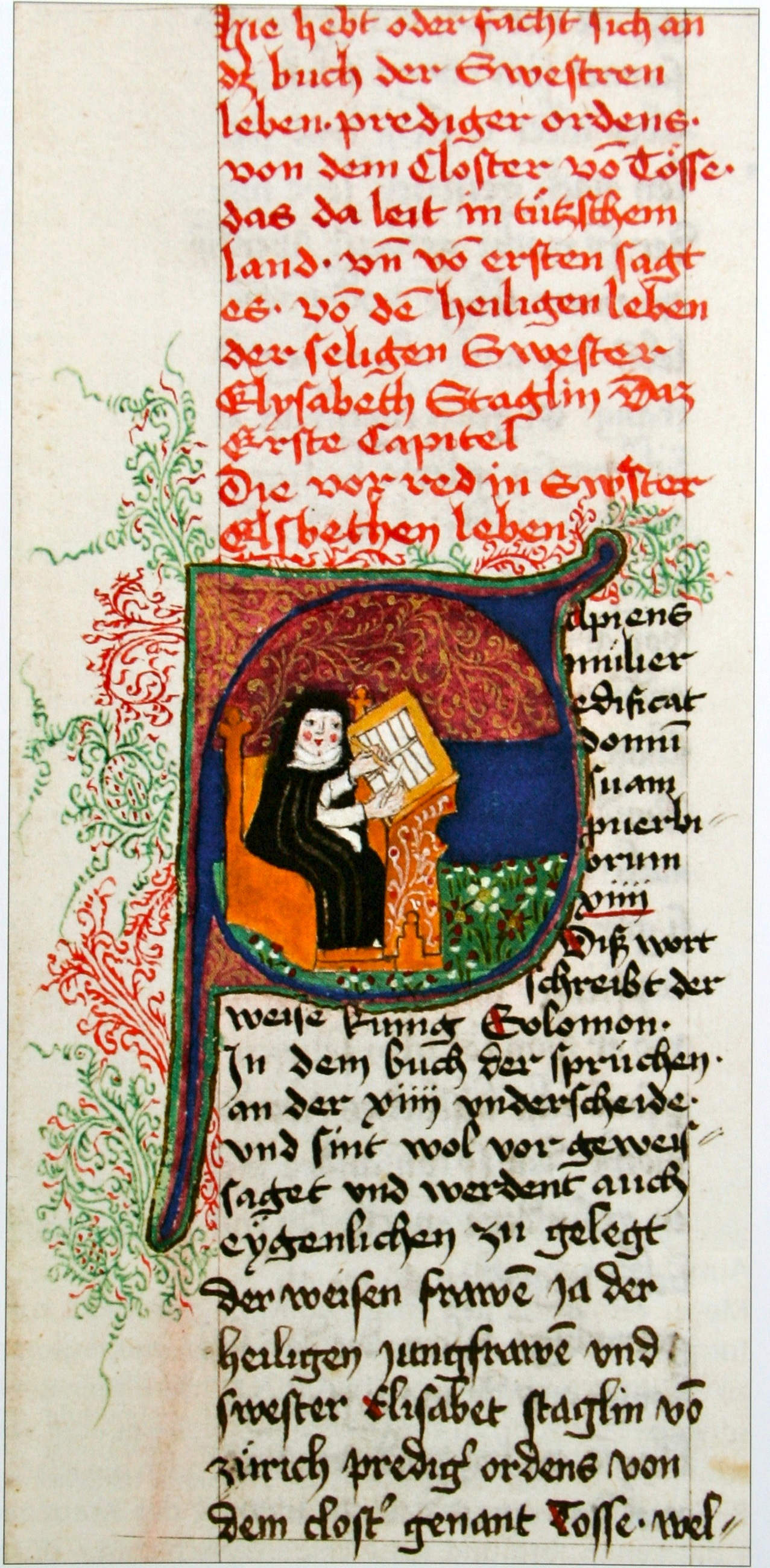
Elsbeth Stagel; excerpt from the Töss Sisters' Book: initial "S"(apiens) with the scribe's portrait of the nun Elsbeth Stagel at her writing desk with quill and penknife

Sister-books (German: Schwesternbuch) is the term for a group of texts in the medieval literature. These works were written by Dominican nuns in the first half of the fourteenth century in South Germany and Switzerland. They relate the mystical experiences of sisters within the monastery, and were influential in the development of medieval mysticism.

== Content ==
Some of the sister-books begin with brief, mostly legendary, outlines of the founding history of the monastery, but less attention is paid to the historical facts than to the sentiments and heroic actions of founders. The central content of the books consists of reports on the lives of deceased members of the convent. The sister-books depict not only convent sisters, but also lay nuns and sometimes also men associated with the convent. The presentation usually concentrates on those events in which the subject has acted in an exemplary manner, especially through visions or mystical experiences. Occasionally, the reverse is also shown, when a person's failure or the loss of graces is reported. Essential aspects of the monastic as well as the individual religious life come up, along with current theological problems from questions of monastic obedience to the doctrine of grace and the Trinity dogma. Other themes include co-suffering with Christ and the question of the soul.

== Literary form ==
The sister-books are a type of medieval lives literature, in which each work relates the lives of a number of people. These descriptions focus on the person's relationship to God and their behavior in the monastic community. This genre of writing was similar to the Vitae Fratrum of male Dominican orders, which in turn was heavily influenced by the Vitae Patrum, a collection of sayings from early Christian monks. The sister-books are also characterized by both the forms and structures of legendary narrative and the vocabulary and motifs of mysticism; the texts take images and metaphors quite seriously. In addition, note that all but one of the sister-books were written in the German vernacular, while the Unterlinden sister-book was written in Latin. None of the original manuscripts of the sister-books survive to this day; scholars rely on later copies, some of which were done as early as the fifteenth century.

== Significance ==
While the sister-books were often devalued in older scholarship as products of naive nuns and as an expression of a flattened mysticism, today they find new attention as authentic testimonies of a women's monastic writing culture. Since only men were permitted to write theological treatises, highly educated women turned to narrative forms, especially in the form of vision narratives, to explain or discuss concepts of religious thought and action.

At the same time, these books are important documents for the history of German mysticism. They show that mysticism in women's monasteries was not just a consequence of Dominican preaching; rather, it preceded it in some monasteries. In the discourse on women's religious experiences, Meister Eckhart, Johannes Tauler, Heinrich Seuse and others developed their mystical theology and pastoral care.

== Works ==
Cloister	Place of Composition	Author (if known)	Date
Adelhausen Abbey	Freiburg im Breisgau	Anna von Munzingen	c. 1318
Engelthal Abbey	Nürnberg	Christine Ebner	c. 1340-1360
Gotteszell Monastery	Schwäbisch Gmünd	Unknown	c. 1320-1330
St. Katharinental Monastery	Diessenhofen	Unknown	c. 1318-1343 (contested)
Kirchberg convent	Sulz am Neckar	Elisabeth von Kirchberg	c. 1320-1340
Oetenbach Monastery	Zürich	Unknown	c. 1340
Töss Monastery	Winterthur	Elsbeth Stagel	c. 1340
Weil Monastery	Esslingen am Neckar	Unknown	c. 1350
Unterlinden Abbey	Colmar	Katharina von Gebersweile	c. 1310-1330
