= Anna von Munzingen =

Anna von Munzingen was a German prioress of the 14th century, who descended from a well known noble family at Freiburg. In 1318 she wrote a "chronicle" of the mystical experiences of her nuns in the work Adelhausen Schwesternbuch (Sister-book of the Adelhausen Convent). The text was originally composed in Latin, but only a Middle High German translation survives. The chronicle comprises a collection of thirty-seven biographies of the sisters, focussing on visions, theophanies and mystical experiences. Anna focussed entirely on the experiences of the women within the convent, emphasizing a sense of independence from the friars, whom many of the sisters resented. The work belongs to a genre known as sister-books, which was also known from other German convents of the period, including Christine Ebner and Katherina von Gebersweiler. Because nuns were not given the same privileges as friars to participate in sermon activities, this genre became ideal for women like Anna to express themselves in writing.
