= Theologia Germanica =

14th-century text on Christian mysticism

Theologia Germanica, also known as Theologia Deutsch or Teutsch, or as Der Franckforter, is a mystical treatise believed to have been written in the later 14th century by an anonymous author. It was discovered and published by Martin Luther and became popular and influential in Lutheran pietistic circles. According to the introduction of the Theologia the author was a priest and a member of the Teutonic Order living in Frankfurt, Germany.

The Theologia was written during the disruptive reign of the Avignon Papacy (1309–78), when many clerics were forbidden to perform Catholic rites because of the power struggle between the Pope and Holy Roman Emperor. Lay groups of pious individuals, like the Friends of God, became prominent during this time, and the author is usually associated with the Friends of God.

The Theologia Germanica survives today in only eight manuscripts, all from the second half of the fifteenth century, suggesting that it was not widely disseminated before it came to the attention of Martin Luther.

== Luther's view ==
Martin Luther produced a partial edition first in 1516. At that time Luther thought the work might have been written by Johannes Tauler. In 1518, he produced a more complete edition on the basis of a new manuscript that had come to his attention. It was Luther who gave the treatise its modern name; in the manuscripts it is known as Der Franckforter (The Frankfurter). Luther found much that was congenial to him in this late medieval text.

Theologia Germanica proposes that God and man can be wholly united by following a path of perfection, as exemplified by the life of Christ, renouncing sin and selfishness, ultimately allowing God’s will to replace human will. Luther wrote,

[N]ext to the Bible and St. Augustine, no book has ever come into my hands, from which I have learned... more of God, and Christ, and man and all things that are...

Aldous Huxley assessed Luther’s view of Theologia Germanica by describing it as “that book which Luther professed to love so much, and from which, if we may judge from his career, he learned so singularly little.”

Another goal of Luther in the publication was supporting his thesis that the German language was just as well-suited for expressing theological ideas as the Hebrew, Greek, and Latin languages. The treatise itself does not discuss or reflect on the fact that it is written in German.

Theologia Germanica gained immense cachet in the Radical Reformation, and in later Lutheran and Pietist traditions. In 1528, Ludwig Haetzer republished Theologia Germanica with interpretive "Propositions" by the Radical Reformer Hans Denck. Towards the end of his life (1541–42), the radical Sebastian Franck produced a Latin paraphrase of the Haetzer version. Sebastian Castellio published Latin (1557) and French (1558) translations, after his break with John Calvin over the execution of Michael Servetus (1553). Just over a decade later, Valentin Weigel studied the work in his Short Account and Introduction to the German Theology (1571). The mystic Johann Arndt reedited an earlier printing based on Luther in 1597; this version was endorsed by Philipp Jakob Spener and had over sixty later printings. In total, about two hundred editions were published between the sixteenth and twentieth centuries.

== Opposing views ==
John Calvin rejected the work. In a letter to the Reformed Congregation in Frankfurt, Calvin says it is "conceived by Satan's cunning... [I]t contains a hidden poison which can poison the church."

The support for the Theologia Germanica among Protestants led to Catholic suspicion of the work. In 1612, Pope Paul V placed it on the Catholic Church’s Index Librorum Prohibitorum, where it remained into the second half of the twentieth century.

== Translations ==
The first English translation of the Theologia Germanica dates from 1648. It may have been the work of the preacher John Everard.

A text from 1497, the Wuerzburg or Bronnbach manuscript, was discovered in 1843 and contained text not included in Luther's editions. This text forms the basis of most subsequent English translations. Susanna Winkworth translated the book in 1857.

In 1980, Bengt R. Hoffman brought out an English translation of Luther's 1518 edition (ISBN 978-0-8091-2291-2).

David Blamires' 2003 English translation under the title The Book of the Perfect Life (ISBN 978-0-7591-0519-5) is based on Wolfgang von Hinten's 1982 critical edition of the original text (ISBN 978-3-7608-3378-1).

== See also ==
- Henry More
- Pierre Poiret
- Christian mysticism
- Meister Eckhart
- Mysticism
- German mysticism

== Sources ==
- Theologia germanica, Christian Classics Ethereal Library.
- Theologia Germanica public domain audiobook at LibriVox
- David Blamires, trans., Theologia Deutsch—Theologia Germanica: The Book of the Perfect Life (Sacred Literature Series. Walnut Creek: Altamira Press, 2003)
- John Furguson, Encyclopedia of Mysticism and Mystery Religions (Crossroad: New York, 1982)
- Hoffman, Bengt, tr (1980), The Theologia Germanica of Martin Luther, The Classics of Western Spirituality, Paulist Press.
- McGinn, Bernard (2005), The Harvest of Mysticism, pp. 392–404.
- Winkworth, Susanna, tr (1857), Theologia Germanica, Andover: John P Jewett & Co
