= Henry of Nördlingen =

German Catholic priest

Henry of Nördlingen (German: Heinrich von Nördlingen) was a German Catholic priest from Bavaria, who lived in the 14th century, his date of death being unknown. He was the spiritual adviser of Margaretha Ebner (died 1351), the mystic nun of Medingen.

== Life ==
The life of Henry is only known from his correspondence and the writings of the Ebners during the period between 1332 and 1351. Of these nineteen years, the first three were spent in or about Nördlingen, where Henry was the beloved director of a group of mystics which included his mother. In 1335 he set out for Avignon on a voluntary exile in consequence of the dispute between the pope and the emperor.

Among others, he wrote to, or visited, Margaretha Ebner and Christina Ebner, as well as Johannes Tauler, Henry Suso and Rulman Merswin, known as the Friends of God.

He translated the book of Mechtilde of Magdeburg into High German and urged other mystics, such as Margaretha Ebner, to write down accounts of their visions.

His visits and instructions were received by the Cistercians of Kaisheim, the Dominican nuns of Engelthal and Medingen, the Bernardines of Zimmern Convent at Deiningen, and by the Benedictine nuns of Hohenwart Abbey. To his correspondents he sent books both of theology (including works by Thomas Aquinas) and of mysticism, as well as some relics.

In 1339, a short while after his return to Nördlingen, his fidelity in abiding by the interdict brought him into a critical position, and he went by way of Augsburg and Constance to Basel, where he found Tauler and where several of the Gottesfreunde followed him from Bavaria.

At Basel (January, 1339), which he now made the centre of his activity, his success in the confessional and pulpit brought crowds to him, especially in 1345. Letters to Margaretha Ebner give an idea of his work, fears, and hopes; in 1346-7 he made several trips to Cologne and Bamberg; then he left Basel, much regretted by the Gottesfreunde, and after a wandering life of preaching in Alsace (1348–9), while the Black Death was raging in Germany, he returned to his country (1350), a little before the death of Margaretha Ebner.

== Works ==
His works consist of a collection of fifty-eight letters, of which only one manuscript remains (British Museum). It is the first collection of letters, properly so called, in German literature, as the letters of Henry Suso, which are an earlier composition, are practically sermons, a title which they bear in many manuscripts. They are not speculative, or deep meditations on mysticism; with him all was sentiment.

To his letters must be joined the translation from Low German into High German of the work of Mechtilde, now at Einsiedeln.
