= Temple Neuf, Strasbourg =

Lutheran church in France

Coordinates: 48°35′00″N 7°44′54″E

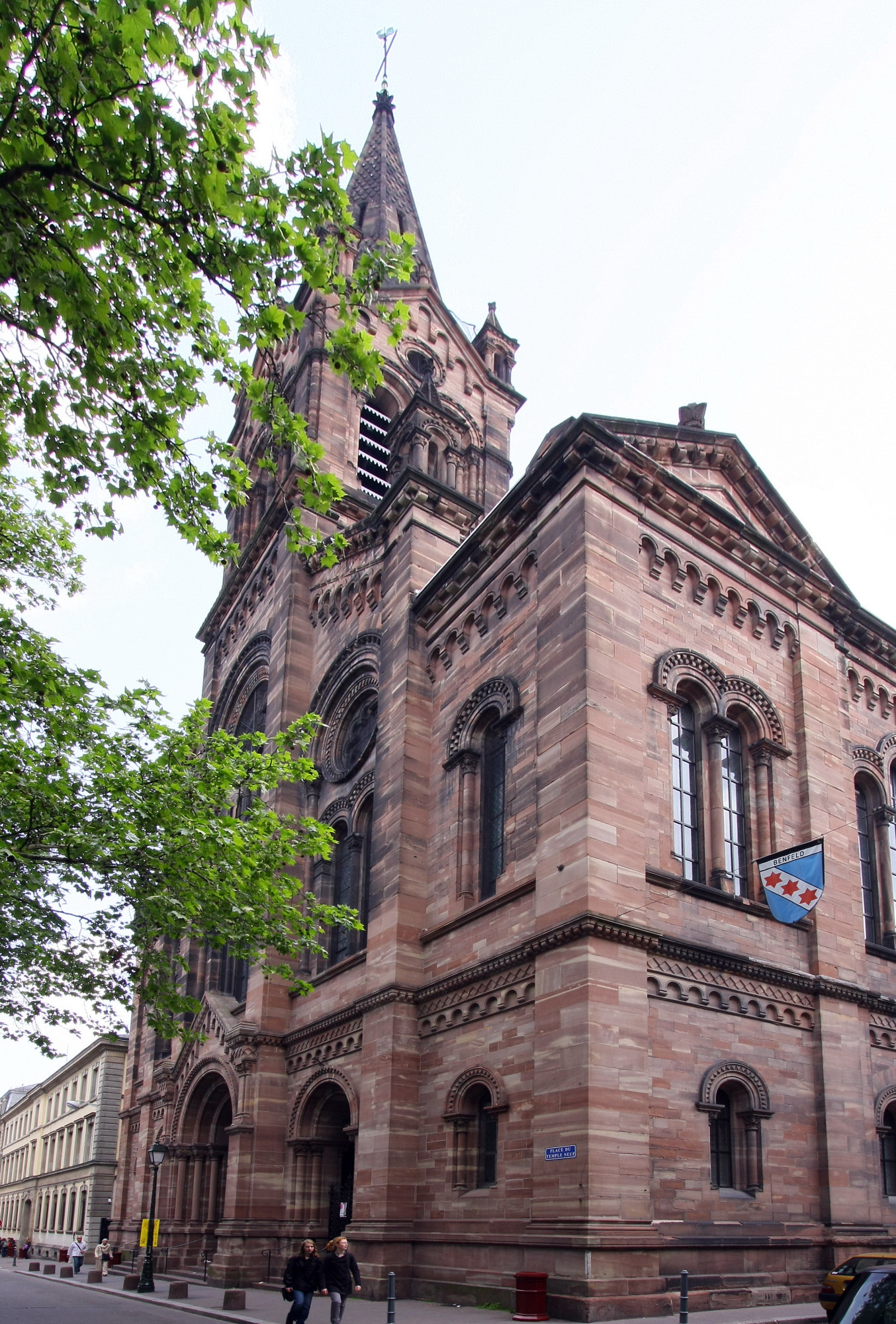
Temple Neuf

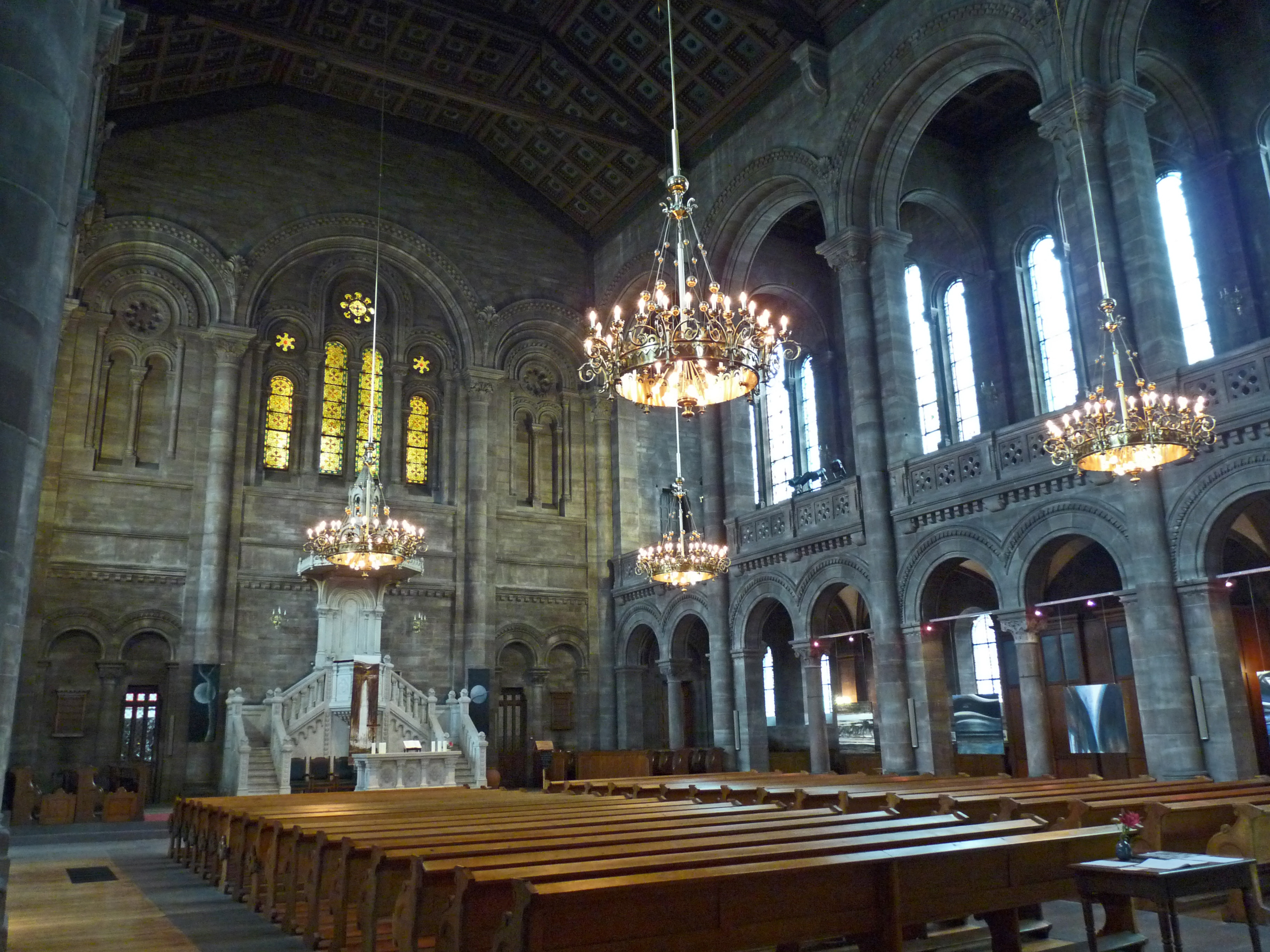
Interior looking east

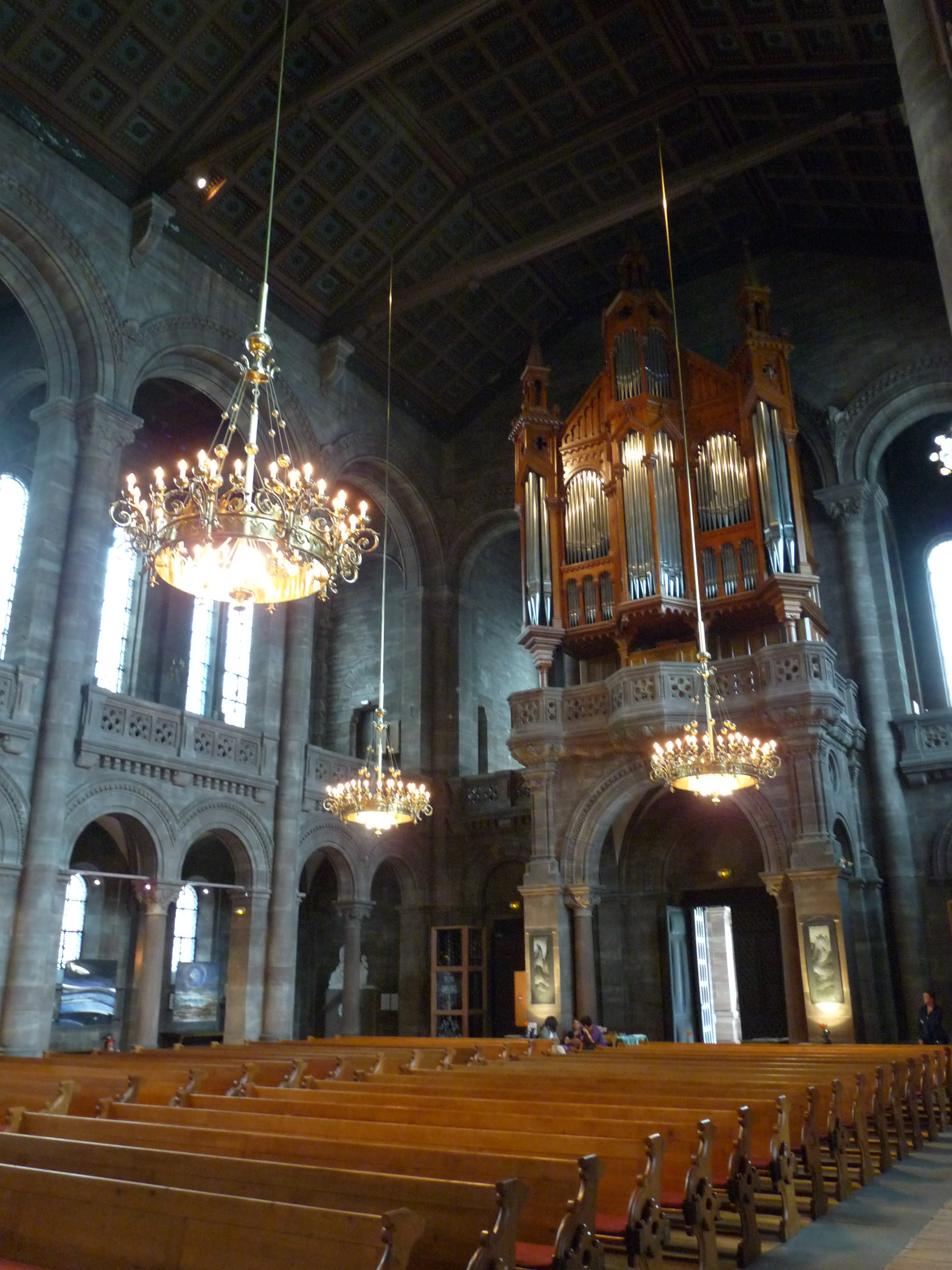
Interior looking west

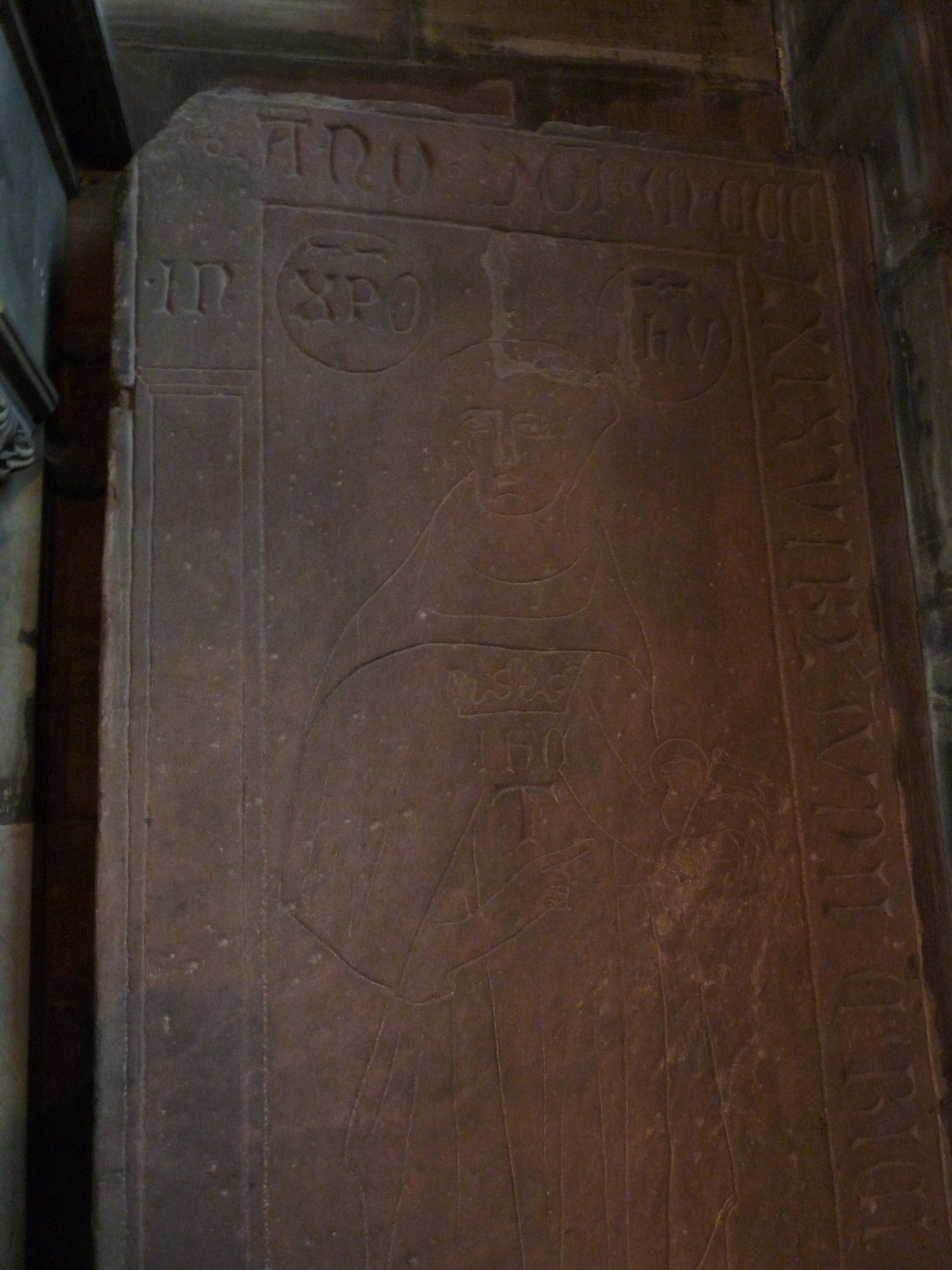
Ledger stone of Johannes Tauler

The Temple Neuf in Strasbourg is a Lutheran church built on the site of the former Dominican convent where Meister Eckhart studied. The Temple was constructed at the end of the 19th century after the old Dominican Church was destroyed during the Siege of Strasbourg on the night of 24-25 August 1870, during the Franco-Prussian War. The ensuing fire also destroyed the libraries of the University of Strasbourg and the City of Strasbourg which were located at the Temple Neuf site.

The Dominican convent had been built in 1260 and in 1538 the Jean Sturm Gymnasium was attached. When Strasbourg became Protestant in 1590, the library of the Protestant seminary was transferred to the convent building.

The current church building was built from 1874 to 1877 in pink sandstone and a Neo-Romanesque style. The architect was Emile Salomon. The name "Temple Neuf" is a translation of the German name "Neue Kirche" that the former Dominican Church had carried since 1681, when, with the annexation of Strasbourg by Louis XIV of France, the Protestants had to leave Strasbourg Cathedral.

The Church contains the tombstone of Johannes Tauler, the famous Dominicain mystic and preacher.

The 1877 organ is by the famous German organ maker Joseph Merklin.
