= Meister Eckhart =

German Catholic priest and philosopher (c. 1260–1328)

The Reverend Eckhart von Hochheim OP
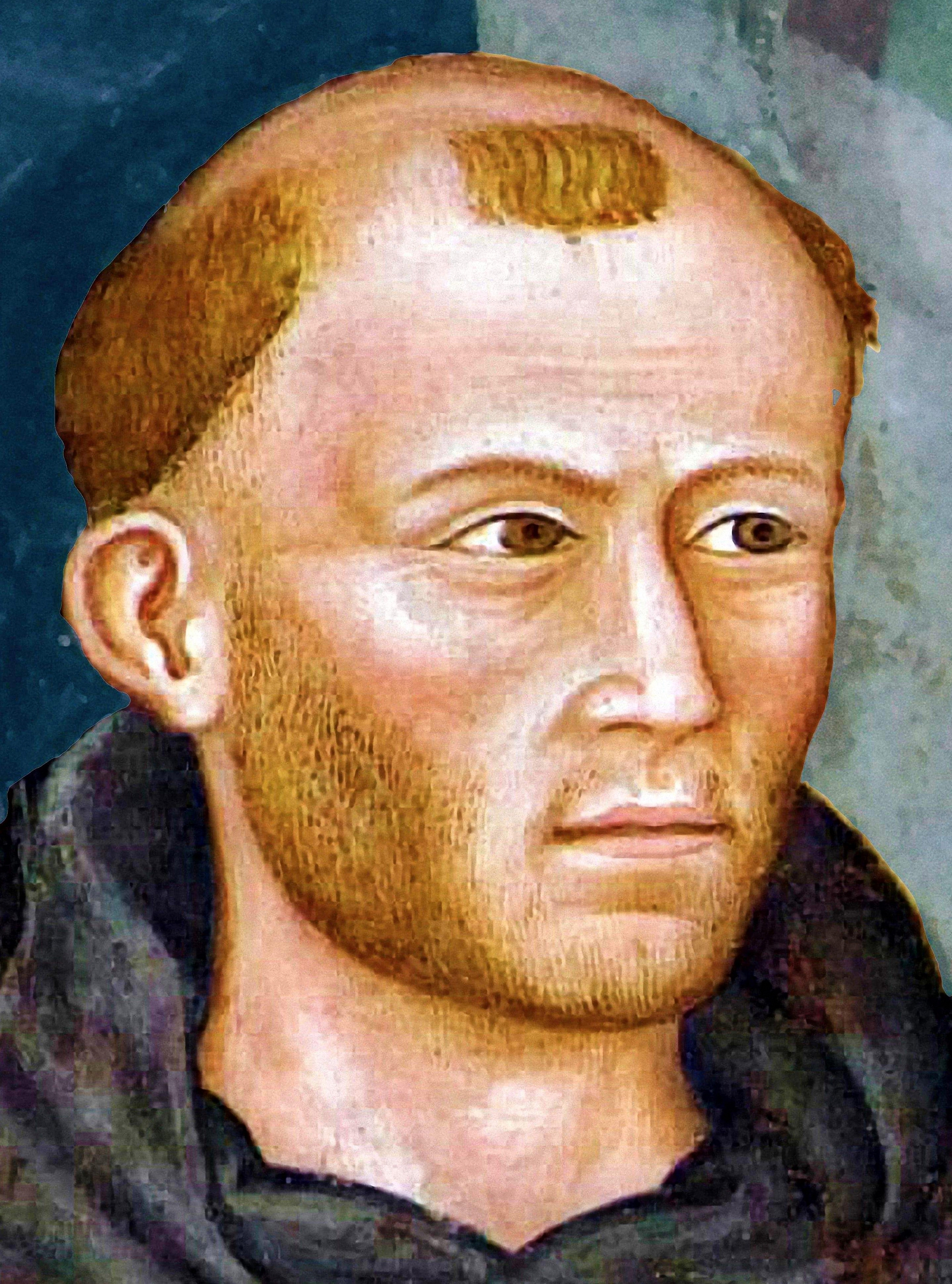
- Posthumous portrait by Andrea di Bonaiuto, c. 1366
- Born: 1260; Tambach, Landgraviate of Thuringia, Holy Roman Empire
- Died: 1328 (aged 67–68) probably Avignon, Kingdom of Arles, Holy Roman Empire

Philosophical work
- Era: Medieval philosophy
- Region: Western philosophy
- School: Neoplatonism; Theological intellectualism
- Main interests: Religion, spirituality, theology
- Notable ideas: Ground of the Soul

Eckhart von Hochheim OP (born Johannes Eckhart; c. 1260 – c. 1328), commonly known as Meister Eckhart (Note: Meister is German for "Master", referring to the academic title Magister in theologia that he obtained in Paris.) (German: [ˈmaɪstɐ ˈʔɛkaʁt]), was a German Catholic priest, theologian, philosopher and mystic. He was born near Gotha in the Landgraviate of Thuringia in the Holy Roman Empire. He was a member of the Dominican Order.

Eckhart came into prominence during the Avignon Papacy at a time of increased tensions between monastic orders, diocesan clergy, the Franciscans, and the Dominicans. In later life, he was accused of heresy, brought up before the local Franciscan-led Inquisition and tried as a heretic by Pope John XXII with the bull In Agro Dominico of March 27, 1329. (Note: His "Defence" is famous for his reasoned arguments to all challenged articles of his writing, and his refutation of heretical intent.) In the trial, excerpts of his Book of Divine Consolation were used against Eckhart. He seems to have died before his verdict was received. (Note: There is no record of the date and place of his death, but John XXII records that he was already dead when his propositions were condemned.)

Eckhart was well known for his work with pious lay groups such as the Friends of God and was succeeded by his more circumspect disciples Johannes Tauler and Henry Suso, the latter of whom was beatified. Since the 19th century, Eckhart has received renewed attention. He has acquired a status as a great mystic within contemporary new age spirituality, as well as considerable interest from scholars situating him within the medieval scholastic and philosophical tradition.

== Early life ==
Eckhart was likely born around 1260 in the village of Tambach, near Gotha, in the Landgraviate of Thuringia. It was previously asserted that he was born to a noble family of landowners, but this originated in a misinterpretation of the archives of the period. In reality, little is known about his family and early life. There is no basis for giving him the Christian name of Johannes, which sometimes appears in biographical sketches: his Christian name was Eckhart; his surname was von Hochheim.

== Career ==
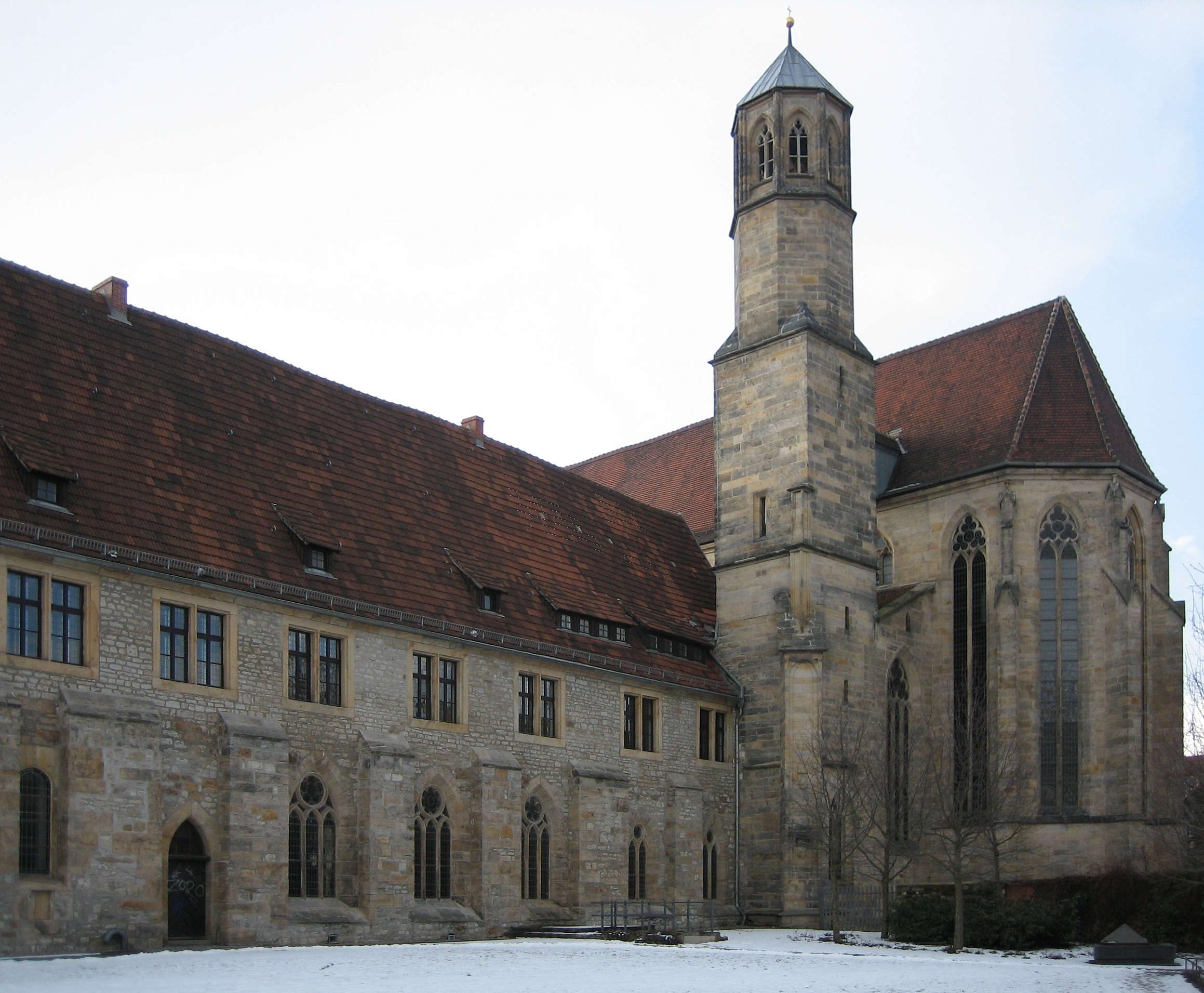
Predigerkirche

Probably around 1278, Eckhart joined the Dominican convent at Erfurt, when he was about eighteen. It is assumed he studied at Cologne before 1280. He may have also studied at the University of Paris, either before or after his time in Cologne.

The first solid evidence we have for his life is when on 18 April 1294, as a baccalaureus (lecturer) on the Sentences of Peter Lombard, a post to which he had presumably been appointed in 1293 (he had been ordained to the priesthood by that time), he preached the Easter Sermon (the Sermo Paschalis) at the Dominican convent of St. Jacques in Paris. In late 1294, Eckhart was made Prior at Erfurt and Dominican Provincial of Thuringia in Germany. His earliest vernacular work, Reden der Unterweisung (The Talks of Instructions/Counsels on Discernment), a series of talks delivered to Dominican novices, dates from this time (c. 1295–1298). In 1302, he was sent to Paris to take up the external Dominican chair of theology. He remained there until 1303. The short Parisian Questions date from this time.

In late 1303, Eckhart returned to Erfurt and was given the position of Provincial superior for Saxony, a province which reached at that time from the Netherlands to Livonia. Thereby, he had responsibility for forty-seven convents in the region. Complaints made against the Provincial superior of Teutonia and him at the Dominican general chapter held in Paris in 1306, concerning irregularities among the ternaries, must have been trivial, because the general, Aymeric of Piacenza, appointed him in the following year as his vicar-general for Bohemia with full power to set the demoralised monasteries there in order. Eckhart was Provincial for Saxony until 1311, during which time he founded three convents for women there.

On 14 May 1311 Eckhart was appointed by the general chapter held at Naples as teacher at Paris. To be invited back to Paris for a second stint as magister was a rare privilege, previously granted only to Thomas Aquinas. Eckhart stayed in Paris for two academic years, until the summer of 1313, living in the same house as inquistor William of Paris. After that follows a long period of which it is known only that Eckhart spent part of the time at Strasbourg. It is unclear what specific office he held there: he seems chiefly to have been concerned with spiritual direction and with preaching in convents of Dominicans.

A passage in a chronicle of the year 1320, extant in manuscript (cf. Wilhelm Preger, i. 352–399), speaks of a prior Eckhart at Frankfurt who was suspected of heresy, and some historians have linked this to Meister Eckhart.

== Accusation of heresy ==
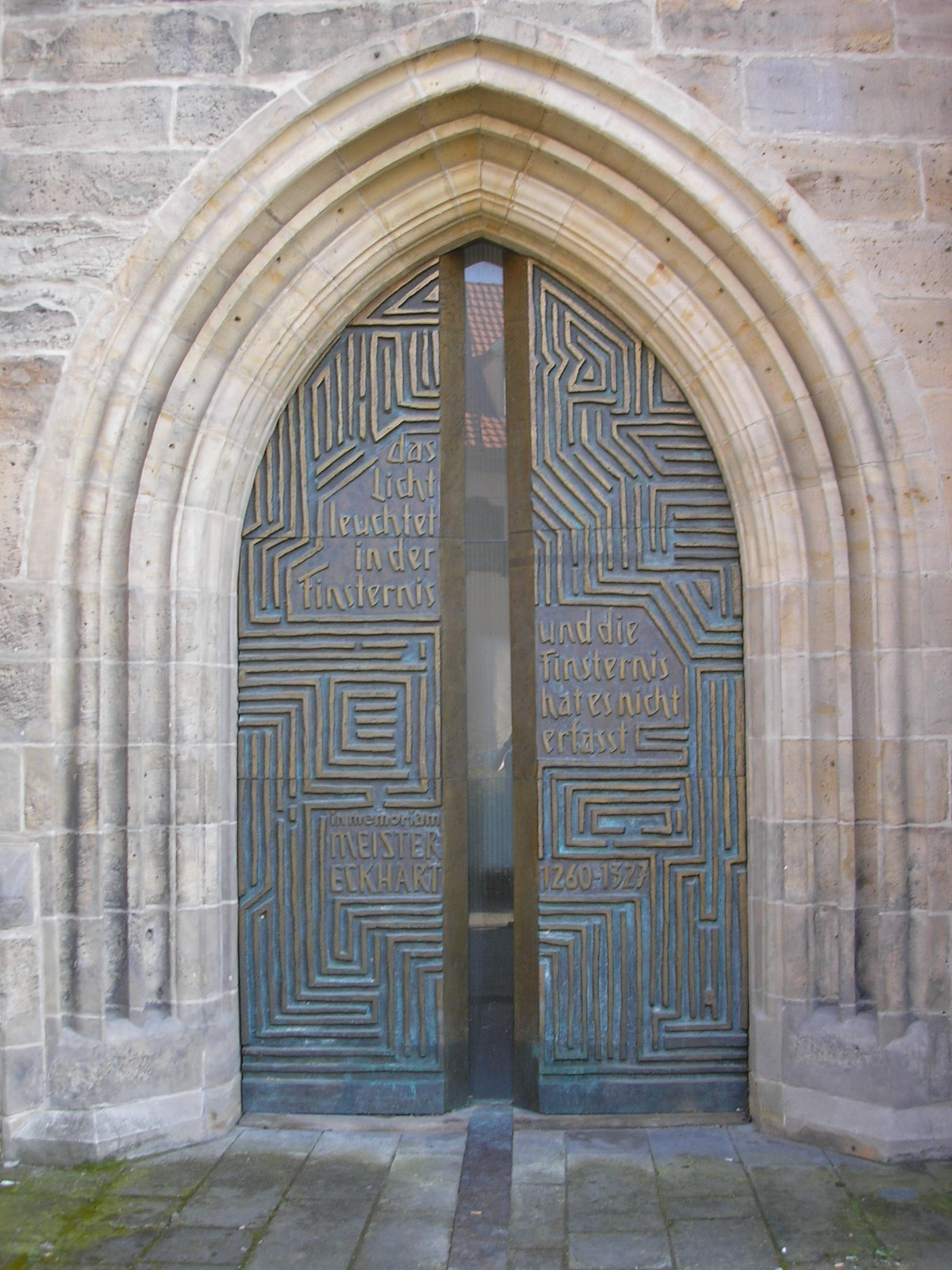
The Meister Eckhart portal of the Erfurt Church

In late 1323 or early 1324, Eckhart left Strasbourg for the Dominican house at Cologne. It is not clear exactly what he did there, though part of his time may have been spent teaching at the prestigious Studium in the city. Eckhart also continued to preach, addressing his sermons during a time of disarray among the clergy and monastic orders, rapid growth of numerous pious lay groups, and the Inquisition's continuing concerns over heretical movements throughout Europe.

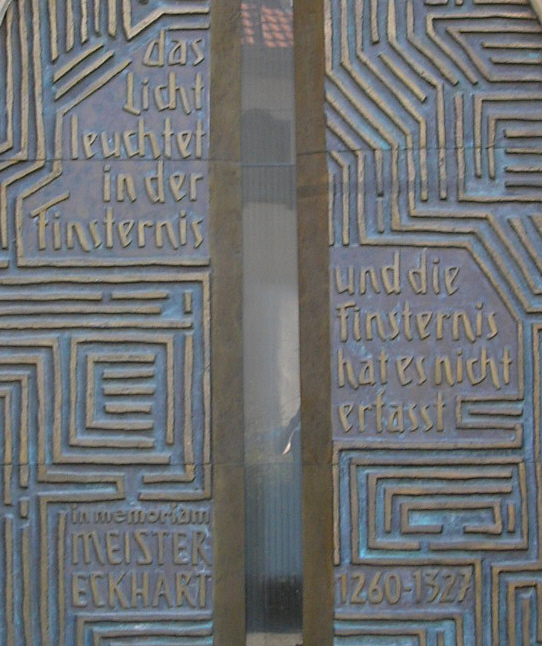
The Meister Eckhart portal of the Erfurt Church (Predigerkirche), quoting John 1:5

It appears that some of the Dominican authorities already had concerns about Eckhart's teaching. The Dominican General Chapter held in Venice in the spring of 1325 had spoken out against "friars in Teutonia who say things in their sermons that can easily lead simple and uneducated people into error". This concern (or perhaps concerns held by the archbishop of Cologne, Henry of Virneburg) may have been why Nicholas of Strasburg, to whom the Pope had given the temporary charge of the Dominican convents in Germany in 1325, conducted an investigation into Eckhart's orthodoxy. Nicholas presented a list of suspect passages from the Book of Consolation to Eckhart, who responded sometime between August 1325 and January 1326 with the treatise Requisitus, now lost, which convinced his immediate superiors of his orthodoxy. Despite this assurance, however, the archbishop in 1326 ordered an inquisitorial trial. At this point Eckhart issued a Vindicatory Document, providing chapter and verse of what he had been taught.

Throughout the difficult months of late 1326, Eckhart had the full support of the local Dominican authorities, as evident in Nicholas of Strasbourg's three official protests against the actions of the inquisitors in January 1327. On 13 February 1327, before the archbishop's inquisitors pronounced their sentence on Eckhart, Eckhart preached a sermon in the Dominican church at Cologne, and then had his secretary read out a public protestation of his innocence. He stated in his protest that he had always detested everything wrong, and should anything of the kind be found in his writings, he now retracts. Eckhart himself translated the text into German, so that his audience, the vernacular public, could understand it. The verdict then seems to have gone against Eckhart. Eckhart denied competence and authority to the inquisitors and the archbishop, and appealed to the Pope against the verdict. He then, in the spring of 1327, set off for Avignon.

In Avignon, Pope John XXII seems to have set up two tribunals to inquire into the case, one of theologians and the other of cardinals. Evidence of this process is thin. However, it is known that the commissions reduced the 150 suspect articles down to 28; the document known as the Votum Avenionense gives, in scholastic fashion, the twenty-eight articles, Eckhart's defence of each, and the rebuttal of the commissioners. On 30 April 1328, the pope wrote to Archbishop Henry of Virneburg that the case against Eckhart was moving ahead, but added that Eckhart had already died (modern scholarship suggests he may have died on 28 January 1328). The papal commission eventually confirmed (albeit in modified form) the decision of the Cologne commission against Eckhart.

Pope John XXII issued a bull (In agro dominico), 27 March 1329, in which a series of statements from Eckhart is characterized as heretical, another as suspected of heresy. At the close, it is stated that Eckhart recanted before his death everything which he had falsely taught, by subjecting himself and his writing to the decision of the Apostolic see. It is possible that the Pope's unusual decision to issue the bull, despite the death of Eckhart (and the fact that Eckhart was not being personally condemned as a heretic), was due to the pope's fear of the growing problem of mystical heresy, and pressure from his ally Henry of Virneburg to bring the case to a definite conclusion.

== Rehabilitation ==
Eckhart's status in the contemporary Catholic Church has been uncertain. The Dominican Order pressed in the last decade of the 20th century for his full rehabilitation and confirmation of his theological orthodoxy. Pope John Paul II voiced favorable opinion on this initiative, even going as far as quoting from Eckhart's writings, but the outcome was confined to the corridors of the Vatican. In 2010, it was revealed that there had been a response from the Vatican in a letter dated 1992. Timothy Radcliffe, then Master of the Dominicans and recipient of the letter, summarized the contents as follows:

We tried to have the censure lifted on Eckhart ... and were told that there was really no need since he had never been condemned by name, just some propositions which he was supposed to have held, and so we are perfectly free to say that he is a good and orthodox theologian.

Winfried Trusen of Würzburg, a correspondent of Radcliffe, wrote in a defence of Eckhart to Cardinal Ratzinger (later Pope Benedict XVI), stating:

Only 28 propositions were censured, but they were taken out of their context and impossible to verify, since there were no manuscripts in Avignon.

== Influences ==
Eckhart was schooled in medieval scholasticism and was well acquainted with Aristotelianism and Augustinianism. The Neo-Platonism of Pseudo-Dionysius the Areopagite asserted a great influence on him, as reflected in his notions on the Gottheit beyond the God who can be named.

== Teachings ==
=== Sermons ===
Although he was an accomplished academic theologian, Eckhart's best-remembered works are his highly unusual sermons in the vernacular German language rather than in the usual Latin. Eckhart as a preaching friar attempted to guide his flock, as well as monks and nuns under his jurisdiction, with practical sermons on spiritual/psychological transformation and New Testament metaphorical content related to the creative power inherent in disinterest (dispassion or detachment).

The central theme of Eckhart's German sermons is the presence of God in the individual soul, and the dignity of the soul of the just man. Although he elaborated on this theme, he rarely departed from it. In one sermon, Eckhart gives the following summary of his message:

When I preach, I usually speak of detachment and say that a man should be empty of self and all things; and secondly, that he should be reconstructed in the simple good that God is; and thirdly, that he should consider the great aristocracy which God has set up in the soul, such that by means of it man may wonderfully attain to God; and fourthly, of the purity of the divine nature.

As Eckhart said in his trial defence, his sermons were meant to inspire in listeners the desire above all to do some good. In this, he frequently used unusual language or seemed to stray from the path of orthodoxy, which made him suspect to the Church during the tense years of the Avignon Papacy.

=== Theology proper ===
In Eckhart's vision, God is primarily fecund. Out of overabundance of love the fertile God gives birth to the Son, the Word in all of us. Clearly, (Note: Aside from a rather striking metaphor of "fertility") this is rooted in the Neoplatonic notion of "ebullience; boiling over" of the One that cannot hold back its abundance of Being. Eckhart had imagined the creation not as a "compulsory" overflowing (a metaphor based on a common hydrodynamic picture), but as the free act of will of the triune nature of Deity (refer Trinitarianism).

Another bold assertion is Eckhart's distinction between God and Godhead (Gottheit in German, meaning Godhood or Godhead, state of being God). These notions had been present in Pseudo-Dionysius's writings and John the Scot's De divisione naturae, but Eckhart, with characteristic vigor and audacity, reshaped the germinal metaphors into profound images of polarity between the Unmanifest and Manifest Absolute.

Eckhart taught that "it is not in God to destroy anything which has being, but he perfects all things" leading some scholars to conclude that he may have held to some form of universal salvation.

=== Contemplative method ===
John Orme Mills notes that Eckhart did not "leave us a guide to the spiritual life like St Bonaventure’s Itinerarium – the Journey of the Soul," but that his ideas on this have to be condensed from his "couple of very short books on suffering and detachment" and sermons. According to Mills, Eckhart's comments on prayer are only about contemplative prayer and "detachment."

According to Reiner Schürmann, four stages can be discerned in Eckhart's understanding mystical development: dissimilarity, similarity, identity, breakthrough.

== Influence and study ==
=== 13th century ===
Eckhart was one of the most influential 13th-century Christian Neoplatonists in his day, and remained widely read in the later Middle Ages. Some early twentieth-century writers believed that Eckhart's work was forgotten by his fellow Dominicans soon after his death. In 1960, however, a manuscript ("in agro dominico") was discovered containing six hundred excerpts from Eckhart, clearly deriving from an original made in the Cologne Dominican convent after the promulgation of the bull condemning Eckhart's writings, as notations from the bull are inserted into the manuscript. The manuscript came into the possession of the Carthusians in Basel, demonstrating that some Dominicans and Carthusians had continued to read Eckhart's work.

It is also clear that Nicholas of Cusa, Archbishop of Cologne in the 1430s and 1440s, engaged in extensive study of Eckhart. He assembled, and carefully annotated, a surviving collection of Eckhart's Latin works. As Eckhart was the only medieval theologian tried before the Inquisition as a heretic, the subsequent (1329) condemnation of excerpts from his works cast a shadow over his reputation for some, but followers of Eckhart in the lay group Friends of God existed in communities across the region and carried on his ideas under the leadership of such priests as John Tauler and Henry Suso.

=== Johannes Tauler and Rulman Merswin ===
Eckhart is considered by some to have been the inspirational "layman" referred to in Johannes Tauler's and Rulman Merswin's later writings in Strasbourg where he is known to have spent time (although it is doubtful that he authored the simplistic Book of the Nine Rocks published by Merswin and attributed to The Friend of God from the Oberland). On the other hand, most scholars consider The Friend of God from the Oberland to be a pure fiction invented by Merswin to hide his authorship because of the intimidating tactics of the Inquisition at the time.

=== Theologia Germanica and the Reformation ===
It has been suspected that his practical communication of the mystical path is behind the influential 14th-century "anonymous" Theologia Germanica, which was disseminated after his disappearance. According to the medieval introduction of the document, its author was an unnamed member of the Teutonic Order of Knights living in Frankfurt.

The lack of imprimatur from the Church and anonymity of the author of the Theologia Germanica did not lessen its influence for the next two centuries – including Martin Luther at the peak of public and clerical resistance to Catholic indulgences – and was viewed by some early 20th-century historians as pivotal in provoking Luther's actions and the subsequent Protestant Reformation.

The following quote from the Theologia Germanica depicts the conflict between worldly and ecclesiastical affairs:

The two eyes of the soul of man cannot both perform their work at once: but if the soul shall see with the right eye into eternity, then the left eye must close itself and refrain from working, and be as though it were dead. For if the left eye be fulfilling its office toward outward things, that is holding converse with time and the creatures; then must the right eye be hindered in its working; that is, in its contemplation. Therefore, whosoever will have the one must let the other go; for "no man can serve two masters".

=== Obscurity ===
Eckhart was largely forgotten from the sixteenth to the nineteenth centuries, barring occasional interest from thinkers such as Angelus Silesius (1627–1677). For centuries, his writings were known only from a number of sermons found in old editions of Johann Tauler's sermons, published by Kachelouen (Leipzig, 1498) and by Adam Petri (Basel, 1521 and 1522).

=== Rediscovery ===
Interest in Eckhart's works was revived in the early nineteenth century, especially by German Romantics and Idealist philosophers. (Note: Franz von Baader (1765–1841), for instance, studied Eckhart in the early 19th century. Von Baader was a German Roman Catholic philosopher and theologian. He studied under Abraham Gottlob Werner at Freiberg, travelled through several of the mining districts in north Germany, and for four years, 1792–1796, resided in England. There he became acquainted with the ideas of David Hume, David Hartley and William Godwin, which were all distasteful to him. But he also came into contact with the mystical speculations of Meister Eckhart, Louis Claude de Saint-Martin (1743–1803), and above all those of Jakob Boehme, which were more to his liking. In 1796 he returned from England, and came into contact with Friedrich Schelling, and the works he published during this period were manifestly influenced by that philosopher.) Franz Pfeiffer's publication in 1857 of Eckhart's German sermons and treatises added greatly to this interest. Another important figure in the later nineteenth century for the recovery of Eckhart's works was Henry Denifle, who was the first to recover Eckhart's Latin works, from 1886 onwards.

During the late nineteenth and early twentieth century, much Catholic interest in Eckhart was concerned with the consistency of his thought in relation to Neoscholastic thought – in other words, to see whether Eckhart's thought could be seen to be essentially in conformity with orthodoxy as represented by his fellow Dominican Thomas Aquinas.

=== Attribution of works ===
Since the mid-nineteenth century scholars have questioned which of the many pieces attributed to Eckhart should be considered genuine, and whether greater weight should be given to works written in the vernacular, or Latin. Although the vernacular works survive today in over 200 manuscripts, the Latin writings are found only in a handful of manuscripts. Denifle and others have proposed that the Latin treatises, which Eckhart prepared for publication very carefully, were essential to a full understanding of Eckhart.

In 1923, Eckhart's Essential Sermons, Commentaries, Treatises and Defense (also known as the Rechtsfertigung, or "vindicatory document") was re-published. The Defense recorded Eckhart's responses against two of the Inquisitional proceedings brought against him at Cologne, and details of the circumstances of Eckhart's trial. The excerpts in the Defense from vernacular sermons and treatises described by Eckhart as his own, served to authenticate a number of the vernacular works. Although questions remain about the authenticity of some vernacular works, there is no dispute about the genuine character of the Latin texts presented in the critical edition.

=== Eckhart as a mystic ===
Since the 1960s scholars have debated whether Eckhart should be called a "mystic". The philosopher Karl Albert had already argued that Eckhart had to be placed in the tradition of philosophical mysticism of Parmenides and Plato and the neo-Platonist thinkers Plotinus, Porphyry and Proclus. Heribert Fischer argued in the 1960s that Eckhart was a mediaeval theologian. Most recently, Clint Johnson agreed with D. T. Suzuki and argued on the basis of Eckhart's appeals to experience that he is a mystic in the tradition of Augustine and Dionysius the Areopagite. Passages like the following, Johnson contends, point to experience beyond intellectual speculation and philosophizing:

Those who have never been familiar with inward things do not know what God is. Like a man who has wine in his cellar but has never tasted it, he does not know that it is good. (Sermon 10, DW I 164.5–8)

Whoever does not understand what I say, let him not burden his heart with it. For as long as a man is not like this truth, he will not understand what I say. For this is a truth beyond thought that comes immediately from the heart of God. (Sermon 52, DW II 506.1–3)

Kurt Flasch, a member of the so-called Bochum-school of mediaeval philosophy, strongly reacted against the influence of New Age mysticism and "all kinds of emotional subjective mysticism", arguing for the need to free Eckhart from "the Mystical Flood". He sees Eckhart strictly as a philosopher. Flasch argues that the opposition between "mystic" and "scholastic" is not relevant because this mysticism (in Eckhart's context) is penetrated by the spirit of the university, in which it occurred.

According to Hackett, Eckhart is to be understood as an "original hermeneutical thinker in the Latin tradition". To understand Eckhart, he has to be properly placed within the western philosophical tradition of which he was a part.

Josiah Royce, an objective idealist, saw Eckhart as a representative example of 13th and 14th century Catholic mystics "on the verge of pronounced heresy" but without original philosophical opinions. Royce attributes Eckhart's reputation for originality to the fact that he translated scholastic philosophy from Latin into German, and that Eckhart wrote about his speculations in German instead of Latin. Eckhart generally followed Thomas Aquinas's doctrine of the Trinity, but Eckhart exaggerated the scholastic distinction between the divine essence and the divine persons. The very heart of Eckhart's speculative mysticism, according to Royce, is that if, through what is called in Christian terminology the procession of the Son, the divine omniscience gets a complete expression in eternal terms, still there is even at the centre of this omniscience the necessary mystery of the divine essence itself, which neither generates nor is generated, and which is yet the source and fountain of all the divine. The Trinity is, for Eckhart, the revealed God and the mysterious origin of the Trinity is the Godhead, the absolute God.

=== Pantheism or panentheism ===
Several authors identified Eckhart as a pantheist, although interpretations are not unanimous. Hans Lassen Martensen affirmed this idea, although others, like Hegel, disputed it. According to John Dourley, current scholarship holds likely that Eckhart's philosophy "was close to a Platonic or Plotinian pantheism which he sincerely tried to reconcile with his Christianity with ambiguous success".

However, others see him as a panentheist instead. Matthew Fox, whom Dourley described as having faced similar problems as Eckhart in his own theology, is of this stance, quoting from Eckhart's writings: "God created all things in such a way that they are not outside Himself... Everything God creates or does He does or creates in himself." According to Cooper, certain ideas from Eckhart taken alone suggest pantheism, yet picture a "Neo-Platonic panentheism" when understood awhole. Eckhart proposes that his body and his soul are in God more than they are in themselves, which also Armand Maurer interprets as positing that the universe is not God, but is contained within God.

== Modern popularisation ==
=== Theology ===
==== Matthew Fox ====
Matthew Fox (born 1940) is an American theologian. Formerly a priest and a member of the Dominican Order within the Roman Catholic Church, Fox was an early and influential exponent of a movement that came to be known as Creation Spirituality. The movement draws inspiration from the wisdom traditions of Christian scriptures and from the philosophies of such medieval Catholic visionaries as Hildegard of Bingen, Thomas Aquinas, Francis of Assisi, Julian of Norwich, Dante Alighieri, Meister Eckhart and Nicholas of Cusa, and others. Fox has written a number of articles on Eckhart and a book titled Breakthrough: Meister Eckhart's Creation Spirituality in New Translation.

=== Modern philosophy ===
In "Conversation on a Country Path," Martin Heidegger develops his concept of Gelassenheit, or releasement, from Meister Eckhart. Ian Moore argues "that Heidegger consulted Eckhart again and again throughout his career to develop or support his own thought".

The French philosopher Jacques Derrida distinguishes Eckhart's Negative Theology from his own concept of différance although John D. Caputo in his influential The Tears and Prayers of Jacques Derrida emphasises the importance of that tradition for this thought.

=== Modern spirituality ===
Meister Eckhart has become one of the timeless heroes of modern spirituality, which, to historian of religion Wouter Hanegraaff, thrives on an all-inclusive syncretism. This syncretism started with the colonisation of Asia, and the search of similarities between Eastern and Western religions. Western monotheism was projected onto Eastern religiosity by Western orientalists, trying to accommodate Eastern religiosity to a Western understanding, whereafter Asian intellectuals used these projections as a starting point to propose the superiority of those Eastern religions. Early on, the figure of Meister Eckhart has played a role in these developments and exchanges.

Renewed academic attention to Eckhart has attracted favorable attention to his work from contemporary non-Christian mystics. Eckhart's most famous single quote, "The Eye with which I see God is the same Eye with which God sees me", is commonly cited by thinkers within neopaganism and ultimatist Buddhism as a point of contact between these traditions and Christian mysticism.

==== Schopenhauer ====
The first European translation of Upanishads appeared in two parts in 1801 and 1802. The 19th-century philosopher Arthur Schopenhauer was influenced by the early translations of the Upanishads, which he called "the consolation of my life". (Note: And he called his poodle "Atman".) Schopenhauer compared Eckhart's views to the teachings of Indian, Christian and Islamic mystics and ascetics:

If we turn from the forms, produced by external circumstances, and go to the root of things, we shall find that Sakyamuni and Meister Eckhart teach the same thing; only that the former dared to express his ideas plainly and positively, whereas Eckhart is obliged to clothe them in the garment of the Christian myth, and to adapt his expressions thereto.

Schopenhauer also stated:

Buddha, Eckhart, and I all teach essentially the same.

==== Theosophical Society ====
A major force in the mutual influence of Eastern and Western ideas and religiosity was the Theosophical Society, which also incorporated Eckhart in its notion of Theosophy. It searched for ancient wisdom in the East, spreading Eastern religious ideas in the West. One of its salient features was the belief in "Masters of Wisdom", (Note: See also Ascended Master Teachings) "beings, human or once human, who have transcended the normal frontiers of knowledge, and who make their wisdom available to others". The Theosophical Society also spread Western ideas in the East, aiding a modernisation of Eastern traditions, and contributing to a growing nationalism in the Asian colonies.

==== Neo-Vedanta ====
The Theosophical Society had a major influence on Hindu reform movements. (Note: The Theosophical Society and the Arya Samaj were united from 1878 to 1882, as the Theosophical Society of the Arya Samaj.) A major proponent of this "neo-Hinduism", also called "neo-Vedanta", was Vivekananda (1863–1902) who popularised his modernised interpretation of Advaita Vedanta in the 19th and early 20th century in both India and the West, emphasising anubhava ("personal experience") over scriptural authority. Vivekananda's teachings have been compared to Eckhart's teachings.

In the 20th century, Eckhart's thoughts were also compared to Shankara's Advaita Vedanta by Rudolf Otto in his Mysticism East and West. According to Richard King, the aim of this work was to redeem Eckhart's mysticism in Protestant circles, attempting "to establish the superiority of the German mysticism of Eckhart over the Indian mysticism of Sankara".

==== Buddhist modernism ====
The Theosophical Society also had a major influence on Buddhist modernism, and the spread of this modernised Buddhism in the West. Along with Henry Steel Olcott and Anagarika Dharmapala, Helena Blavatsky was instrumental in the Western transmission and revival of Theravada Buddhism.

In 1891, Karl Eugen Neumann, who translated large parts of the Tripitaka, found parallels between Eckhart and Buddhism, which he published in Zwei buddhistische Suttas und ein Traktat Meister Eckharts (Two Buddhist Suttas and a treatise of Meister Eckhart). D. T. Suzuki, who joined the Theosophical Society Adyar and was an active Theosophist, discerned parallels between Eckhart's teachings and Zen Buddhism in his Mysticism: Christian and Buddhist, drawing similarities between Eckhart's "pure nothingness" (ein bloss nicht) and sunyata. Shizuteru Ueda, a third generation Kyoto School philosopher and scholar in medieval philosophy showed similarities between Eckhart's soteriology and Zen Buddhism in an article.

Reiner Schürmann OP, a professor of philosophy, while agreeing with Daisetz T. Suzuki that there exist certain similarities between Zen Buddhism and Meister Eckhart's teaching, also disputed Suzuki's contention that the ideas expounded in Eckhart's sermons closely approach Buddhist thought, "so closely indeed, that one could stamp them almost definitely as coming out of Buddhist speculations". Schurmann's several clarifications included:

1. On the question of "Time" and Eckhart's view (claimed as parallel to Buddhism in reducing awakening to instantaneity) that the birth of the Word in the ground of the mind must accomplish itself in an instant, in "the eternal now", that in fact Eckhart in this respect is rooted directly in the catechisis of the Fathers of the Church rather than merely derived from Buddhism;
2. On the question of "Isness" and Suzuki's contention that the "Christian experiences are not after all different from those of the Buddhist; terminology is all that divides us", that in Eckhart "the Godhead's istigkeit [translated as "isness" by Suzuki] is a negation of all quiddities; it says that God, rather than non-being, is at the heart of all things" thereby demonstrating with Eckhart's theocentrism that "the istigkeit of the Godhead and the isness of a thing then refer to two opposite experiences in Meister Eckhart and Suzuki: in the former, to God, and in the latter, to 'our ordinary state of the mind'" and Buddhism's attempts to think "pure nothingness";
3. On the question of "Emptiness" and Eckhart's view (claimed as parallel to Buddhist emphasis "on the emptiness of all 'composite things'") that only a perfectly released person, devoid of all, comprehends, "seizes", God, that the Buddhist "emptiness" seems to concern man's relation to things while Eckhart's concern is with what is "at the end of the road opened by detachment [which is] the mind espouses the very movement of the divine dehiscence; it does what the Godhead does: it lets all things be; not only must God also abandon all of his own – names and attributes if he is to reach into the ground of the mind (this is already a step beyond the recognition of the emptiness of all composite things), but God's essential being – releasement – becomes the being of a released man."

==== Roman Curial statement ====
With Joseph Ratzinger as Prefect, the Congregation for the Doctrine of the Faith in 1989 published a Letter to the Bishops of the Catholic Church on some aspects of Christian meditation which opposed those who

propose abandoning [...] the very idea of the One and Triune God, who is Love, in favor of an immersion "in the indeterminate abyss of the divinity."

with a footnote stating

Meister Eckhart speaks of an immersion "in the indeterminate abyss of the divinity" which is a "darkness in which the light of the Trinity never shines." Cf. Sermo "Ave Gratia Plena" in fine (J. Quint, Deutsche Predigten und Traktate, Hanser 1955, 261).

=== Psychology and psychoanalysis ===
==== Erich Fromm ====
The notable humanistic psychoanalyst and philosopher Erich Fromm was another scholar who brought renewed attention in the West to Eckhart's writings, drawing upon many of the latter's themes in his large corpus of work. Eckhart was a significant influence in developing United Nations Secretary General Dag Hammarskjöld's conception of spiritual growth through selfless service to humanity, as detailed in his book of contemplations called Vägmärken ("Markings"). (Note: Dusen: "[t]he counterpoint to this enormously exposed and public life is Eckhart and Jan van Ruysbroek. They really give me balance and – a more necessary sense of humor." Henry P van Dusen. Dag Hammarskjöld. A Biographical Interpretation of Markings. Faber and Faber. London 1967 pp. 49–50.)

==== Carl Jung ====
In Aion, Researches into the Phenomenology of Self Carl Jung cites Eckhart approvingly in his discussion of Christ as a symbol of the archetypal self. Jung sees Eckhart as a Christian Gnostic:

Meister Eckhart's theology knows a "Godhead" of which no qualities, except unity and being, can be predicated; it "is becoming," it is not yet Lord of itself, and it represents an absolute coincidence of opposites: "But its simple nature is of forms formless; of becoming becomingless; of beings beingless; of things thingless," etc. Union of opposites is equivalent to unconsciousness, so far as human logic goes, for consciousness presupposes a differentiation into subject and object and a relation between them. (p. 193.)

As the Godhead is essentially unconscious, so too is the man who lives in God. In his sermon on "The Poor in Spirit" (Matt. 5 : 3), the Meister says: "The man who has this poverty has everything he was when he lived not in any wise, neither in himself, nor in truth, nor in God. He is so quit and empty of all knowing that no knowledge of God is alive in him; for while he stood in the eternal nature of god, there lived in him not another: what lived there was himself. And so we say this man is as empty of his own knowledge as he was when he was not anything; he lets God work with what he will, and he stands empty as when he came from God." Therefore he should love God in the following way: "Love him as he is; a not-God, a not-spirit, a not-person, a not-image; as a sheer, pure, clear One, which he is, sundered from all secondness; and in this One let us sink eternally, from nothing to nothing. So help us God. Amen." (p. 193.)

Jung summed up his view of Eckhart saying:

The world-embracing spirit of Meister Eckhart knew, without discursive knowledge, the primordial mystical experience of India as well as of the Gnostics, and was itself the finest flower on the tree of the "Free Spirit" that flourished at the beginning of the eleventh century. Well might the writings of this Master be buried for six hundred years, for "his time was not yet come." Only in the nineteenth century did he find a public at all capable of appreciating the grandeur of his mind. (Page 194.)

=== In popular culture ===
In Jacob's Ladder, Louis, the main character's friend, attributes the following quote to Eckhart:

You know what he [Eckhart] said? The only thing that burns in Hell is the part of you that won't let go of your life; your memories, your attachments. They burn 'em all away. But they're not punishing you, he said. They're freeing your soul. ...If you're frightened of dying and holding on, you'll see devils tearing your life away. But if you've made your peace then the devils are really angels, freeing you from the Earth.

In Z213: Exit, by Dimitris Lyacos the same quote, attributed to Eckhart, appears in a slightly different wording:

Your own are burning and your memories and you don't want to leave them. Everything will burn to the end, you suffer, but nobody is punishing you, they are just setting your soul free. Don't be afraid because while you fear death they will rend your soul like demons. Only calm down and you will see the angels who are setting you free and then you will be free.

In the book The Gargoyle by Andrew Davidson, Eckhart is mentioned in a story Marianne Engel recounts to the (unnamed) protagonist about her days in the Engelthal Monastery:

Meister Eckhart would not even admit that God was good. ...Eckhart's position was that anything that was good can become better, and whatever may become better may become best. God cannot be referred to as "good", "better", or best because He is above all things. If a man says that God is wise, the man is lying because anything that is wise can become wiser. Anything that a man might say about God is incorrect, even calling Him by the name of God. God is "superessential nothingness" and "transcendent Being" ... beyond all words and beyond all understanding. The best a man can do is remain silent, because anytime he prates on about God, he is committing the sin of lying. The true master knows that if he had a God he could understand, he would never hold Him to be God.

Eckhart is also referenced in J. D. Salinger's Franny and Zooey. In a letter to Zooey, Buddy says,

I can't help thinking you'd make a damn site better-adjusted actor if Seymour and I hadn't thrown in the Upanishads and the Diamond Sutra and Eckhart and all our other old loves with the rest of your recommended reading when you were small.

The third movement of John Adams's Harmonielehre symphony (1985) is titled "Meister Eckhart and Quackie", which imagines the mystic floating through space with the composer's daughter Emily (nicknamed Quackie) on his back whispering secrets of grace in his ear.

Eckhart Tolle quotes Meister Eckhart in The Power of Now as saying "Time is what keeps the light from reaching us".

Antoine Sénanque's 2023 novel Croix de cendre revolves around Eckhart's life and teachings after his second departure from Paris.

== Works ==
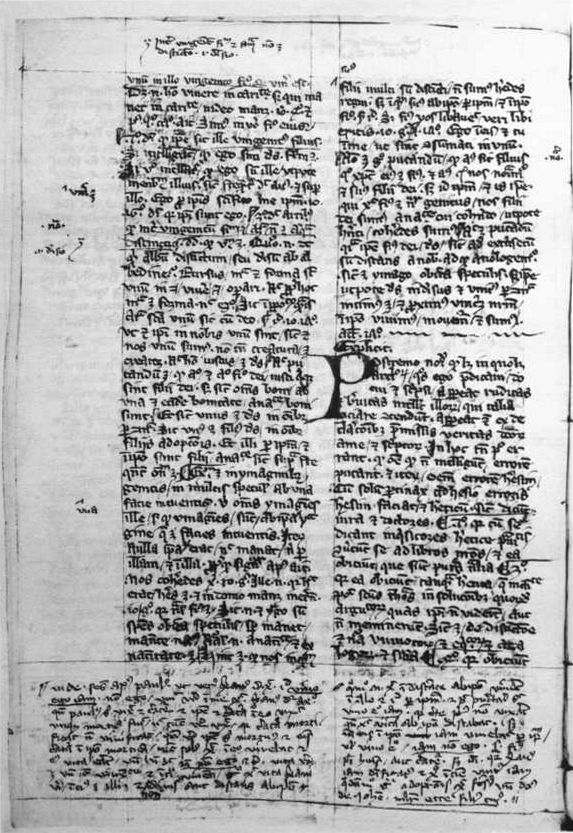
Manuscript Soest, Stadtarchiv und Wissenschaftliche Stadtbibliothek, Codex Nr. 33, folium 57 verso, a–b

The publication of the modern critical edition of Eckhart's German and Latin works began in 1936 and was completed in April 2022.

=== Latin works ===
One difficulty with Eckhart's Latin writings is that they clearly represent only a small portion of what he planned to write. Eckhart describes his plans to write a vast Opus Tripartitum (Three-Part Work). Unfortunately, all that exists today of the first part, the Work of Propositions, is the Prologue illustrating the first proposition (with Eckhart intending the first part alone to consist of over one thousand propositions). The second part, called the Work of Questions, no longer exists. The third part, the Work of Commentaries, is the major surviving Latin work by Eckhart, consisting of a Prologue, six commentaries, and fifty-six sermons. It used to be thought that this work was begun while Eckhart was in Paris between 1311 and 1313; however, recent manuscript discoveries mean that much of what survives must be dated to before 1310.

The surviving Latin works are, therefore:

- The early Quaestiones Parisiensis (Parisian Questions).
- Prologus generalis in Opus tripartitium (General Prologue to the Three-Part Work).
- Prologus in Opus propositionum (Prologue to the Work of Propositions).
- Prologus in Opus expositionum (Prologue to the Work of Commentaries).
- Expositio Libri Genesis (Commentary on the Book of Genesis).
- Liber Parabolorum Genesis (Book of the Parables of Genesis).
- Expositio Libri Exodi (Commentary on the Book of Exodus).
- Expositio Libri Sapientiae (Commentary on the Book of Wisdom).
- Sermones et Lectiones super Ecclesiastici c. 24:23–31 (Sermons and Lectures on the Twenty-fourth chapter of Ecclesiasticus).
- Fragments of the Commentary on the Song of Songs survive
- Expositio sancti Evangelii secundum Iohannem (Commentary on John)
- Various sermons, including some preserved in the collection Paradisus anime intelligentis (Paradise of the Intelligent Soul/Paradise of the Intellectual Soul).
- A brief treatise on the Lord's Prayer, largely an anthology culled from earlier authorities.
- The Defense.
- Although not composed by Eckhart, also relevant are the Vatican archive materials relating to Eckhart's trial, the Votum theologicum (or Opinion) of the Avignon commission who investigated Eckhart, and the bull In agro dominico.

=== Vernacular works ===
Questions concerning the authenticity of the Middle High German texts attributed to Eckhart are much greater than for the Latin texts. The problems involve not only whether to judge a particular sermon or treatise as authentic or pseudonymous, but also, given the large number of manuscripts and the fragmentary condition of many of them, whether it is even possible to establish the text for some of the pieces accepted as genuine. Eckhart's sermons are versions written down by others from memory or from notes, meaning that the possibility for error was much greater than for the carefully written Latin treatises.

The critical edition of Eckhart's works traditionally accepted 86 sermons as genuine, based on the research done by its editor Josef Quint (1898–1976) during the 20th century. Of these, Sermons 1–16b are proved authentic by direct citation in the Defense. Sermons 17–24 have such close textual affinities with Latin sermons recognised as genuine that they are accepted. Sermons 25–86 are harder to verify, and judgements have been made on the basis of style and content. Georg Steer took over the editorship in 1983. Between 2003 and 2016, the critical edition under Georg Steer added another 30 vernacular sermons (Nos. 87 to 117) in volumes 4.1 and 4.2. Because six sermons exist in an A and B version (5a-b, 13-13a, 16a-b, 20a-b, 36a-b und 54a-b) the final total of vernacular sermons is 123 (numbered consecutively from 1 to 117).

When Franz Pfeiffer published his edition of Eckhart's works in 1857, he included seventeen vernacular treatises he considered to be written by Eckhart. Modern scholarship is much more cautious, however, and the critical edition accepts only four of Eckhart's vernacular treatises as genuine:

- The longest of these, the Reden der Unterweisung (Counsels on Discernment/Discourses on Instruction/Talks of Instruction), is probably Eckhart's earliest surviving work, a set of spiritual instructions that he gave to young Dominicans in the 1290s. It was clearly a popular work, with fifty-one manuscripts known.
- A second vernacular treatise, the Liber Benedictus (Book "Benedictus" ), in fact consists of two related treatises firstly, Daz buoch der götlîchen trœstunge (The Book of the Divine Consolation), and secondly, a sermon entitled Von dem edeln menschen (Of the Nobleman).
- The final vernacular treatise accepted as genuine by the critical edition is entitled Von Abgescheidenheit (On Detachment). However, this treatise is generally today not thought to be written by Eckhart.

=== Modern editions and translations ===
- Meister Eckhart: Die deutschen und lateinischen Werke. Herausgegeben im Auftrage der Deutschen Forschungsgemeinschaft. Stuttgart and Berlin: Verlag W. Kohlhammer, 11 Vols., 1936–2022. (This is the critical edition of Meister Eckhart's works. The Latin works comprise six volumes and were completed in 2022. The Middle High German works comprise five volumes and were completed in 2016).
- Eckhart, the German Works: 64 Homilies for the Liturgical Year. I. De Tempore: Introduction, Translation and Notes,
- Meister Eckhart, The Essential Sermons, Commentaries, Treatises and Defense, trans. and ed. by Bernard McGinn and Edmund Colledge, New York: Paulist Press and London: SPCK, 1981. Re-published in paperback without notes and a foreword by John O’Donohue as Meister Eckhart, Selections from His Essential Writings, (New York, 2005).
- Meister Eckhart: Teacher and Preacher, trans. and ed. by Bernard McGinn and Frank Tobin, New York and London: Paulist Press/SPCK, 1987.
- C. de B. Evans, Meister Eckhart by Franz Pfeiffer, 2 vols., London: Watkins, 1924 and 1931.
- Meister Eckhart: A Modern Translation, trans. Raymond B. Blakney, New York: Harper and Row, 1941, ISBN 0-06-130008-X (a translation of many of the works, including treatises, 28 sermons, and Defense).
- Otto Karrer Meister Eckhart Speaks The Philosophical Library, Inc. New York, 1957.
- James M. Clark and John V. Skinner, eds. and trans., Treatises and Sermons of Meister Eckhart, New York: Octagon Books, 1983. (Reprint of Harper and Row ed., 1958/London: Faber & Faber, 1958.)
- Armand Maurer, ed., Master Eckhart: Parisian Questions and Prologues, Toronto, Canada: Pontifical Institute of Medieval Studies, 1974.
- Meister Eckhart, Sermons and Treatises, trans. by M. O'C. Walshe, 3 vols., (London: Watkins, 1979–1981; later printed at Longmead, Shaftesbury, Dorset: Element Books, 1979–1990). Now published as The Complete Mystical Works of Meister Eckhart, trans. and ed. by Maurice O'C Walshe, rev. by Bernard McGinn (New York: The Crossroad Publishing Company, 2009).
- Matthew Fox, Breakthrough: Meister Eckhart's Creation Spirituality in New Translation (Garden City, New York, 1980).
- Meister Eckhart: Selected Writings, ed. and trans. by Oliver Davies, London: Penguin, 1994.
- Meister Eckhart's Book of the Heart: Meditations for the Restless Soul, by Jon M. Sweeney and Mark S. Burrows, Charlottesville, VA: Hampton Roads, 2017.
- Paradox at Play: Metaphor in Meister Eckhart's Sermons with Previously Unpublished Sermons, by Clint Johnson, Washington, DC: Catholic University of America Press, 2023. (translations of all previously unpublished sermons Pfeiffer nos. 87–109 in DW IV volumes 1 and 2, and Sermon 54a which is not in Walshe, Flasch's new manuscript for Sermon 52 and several other sermons)

== See also ==
- Book of the 24 Philosophers
- Brethren of the Free Spirit
- Gonsalvus of Spain
- Sister Catherine Treatise

== Sources ==
- Akhilananda Swami (2012), Hindu Psychology: Its Meaning for the West, Routledge
- Algeo, Adele S. (July 2005), "Beatrice Lane Suzuki and Theosophy in Japan", Theosophical History, XI
- Algeo, Adele S. (January–February 2007), "Beatrice Lane Suzuki: An American Theosophist in Japan", Quest, 95 (1): 13–17
- Boyd-MacMillan, Eolene M (2006), Transformation: James Loder, Mystical Spirituality, and James Hillman, Peter Lang
- Herman Büttner, ed., Schriften und Predigten, vol. 1. Jena: Eugen Diederichs, 1903.
- Herman Büttner, ed., Schriften und Predigten, vol. 2. Jena: Eugen Diederichs, 1909.
- Cooper, John W. (2006), Panentheism -- The Other God of the Philosophers: From Plato to the Present, Baker, ISBN 9781585584048
- Augustine Daniels, O.S.B., ed., "Eine lateinische Rechtfertigungsschrift des Meister Eckharts", Beiträge zur Geschichte der Philosophie des Mittelalters, 23, 5 (Münster, 1923): 1–4, 12–13, 34–35, 65–66.
- Dorrien, Gary (2012), Kantian Reason and Hegelian Spirit: The Idealistic Logic of Modern Theology, Wiley
- Dourley, John (2014), Jung and His Mystics: In the End it All Comes to Nothing, Taylor & Francis
- Fields, Rick (1992), How the Swans Came to the Lake. A Narrative History of Buddhism in America, Boston & London: Shambhala
- Ffytche, Matt (2011), The Foundation of the Unconscious: Schelling, Freud and the Birth of the Modern Psyche, Cambridge University Press
- Fox, Matthew (2014), Meister Eckhart: A Mystic-Warrior for Our Times, Baker, ISBN 9781585584048
- Ganapathy (2003), The Way of the Siddhas. In: K. R. Sundararajan, Bithika Mukerji (2003), Hindu Spirituality, Motilal Banarsidass Publ.
- Gilchrist, Cherry (1996), Theosophy. The Wisdom of the Ages, HarperSanFrancisco
- Gombrich, Richard F. (1996), Theravāda Buddhism. A Social History from Ancient Benares to Modern Colombo, London and New York: Routledge
- Hackett, Jeremiah (2012), A Companion to Meister Eckhart, Brill
- Hanegraaff, Wouter J. (1996), New Age Religion and Western Culture: Esotericism in the Mirror of Secular Thought, Boston: Brill Academic Publishers, ISBN 978-90-04-10696-3
- Johnson, K. Paul (1994), The masters revealed: Madam Blavatsky and the myth of the Great White Lodge, SUNY Press, ISBN 0-7914-2063-9
- Johnson, Clint (2023), Paradox at Play: Metaphor in Meister Eckhart's Sermons with Previously Unpublished Sermons, Catholic University of America Press, ISBN 978-0-81-323529-5
- Franz Jostes, ed., Meister Eckhart und seine Jünger: Ungedruckte Texte zur Geschichte der deutschen Mystik. Berlin: De Gruyter, 1972 (Series: Deutsche Neudrucke Texte des Mittelalters).
- Thomas Kaepelli, "Kurze Mitteilungen über mittelalterliche Dominikanerschriftsteller", Archivum Fratrum Praedicatorum 10, (1940), pp. 293–294.
- Thomas Kaepelli, Scriptores ordinis Praedicatorum medii aevi. Vol. I (A–F). Rome, 1970.
- King, Richard (2002), Orientalism and Religion: Post-Colonial Theory, India and "The Mystic East", Routledge
- Gustav Landauer, ed. and trans. Meister Eckharts mystische Schriften. Berlin: Karl Schnabel, 1903.
- M.H. Laurent, "Autour du procés de Maître Eckhart. Les documents des Archives Vaticanes", Divus Thomas (Piacenza) 39 (1936), pp. 331–348, 430–447.
- Lavoie, Jeffrey D. (2012), The Theosophical Society: The History of a Spiritualist Movement, Universal-Publishers
- McMahan, David L. (2008), The Making of Buddhist Modernism, Oxford University Press, ISBN 978-0-19-518327-6
- Michaelson, Jay (2009), Everything Is God: The Radical Path of Nondual Judaism, Shambhala
- Moran, Dermot (2012), Meister Eckhart in 20th Century Philosophy. In: Jeremiah Hacket (2012), A Companion to Meister Eckhart, Brill
- Partridge, Christipher Hugh (2006), Understanding the Dark Side: Western Demonology, Satanic Panics and Alien Abduction, University of Chester
- Franz Pelster, S.J., ed., Articuli contra Fratrem Aychardum Alamannum, Vat. lat. 3899, f. 123r–130v, in "Ein Gutachten aus dem Eckehart-Prozess in Avignon", Aus der Geistewelt des Mittelalters, Festgabe Martin Grabmann, Beiträge Supplement 3, Munster, 1935, pp. 1099–1124.
- Franz Pfeiffer, ed. Deutsche Mystiker des vierzehnten Jahrhunderts, vol. II: Meister Eckhart. 2nd ed. Göttingen: Vandenhoeck, 1906.
- Josef Quint, ed. and trans. Meister Eckehart: Deutsche Predigten und Traktate, Munich: Carl Hanser, 1955.
- Josef Quint, ed., Textbuch zur Mystik des deutschen Mittelalters: Meister Eckhart, Johannes Tauler, Heinrich Seuse, Halle/Saale: M. Niemeyer, 1952.
- Rambachan, Anatanand (1994), The Limits of Scripture: Vivekananda's Reinterpretation of the Vedas, University of Hawaii Press
- Renard, Philip (2010), Non-Dualisme. De directe bevrijdingsweg, Cothen: Uitgeverij Juwelenschip
- Jaroszyński, Piotr (2007), Science in Culture, Rodopi
- Rubin, Bruce Joel, Jacob's Ladder. Mark Mixson, general editor, The Applause Screenplay Series, Applause Theatre Book Publishers, 1990. ISBN 1-55783-086-X.
- Schurmann, Reiner (2001), Wandering Joy: Meister Eckhart's Mystical Philosophy, Lindisfarne Books
- Sinari, Ramakant (2000), Advaita and Contemporary Indian Philosophy. In: Chattopadhyana (gen.ed.), 'History of Science, Philosophy and Culture in Indian Civilization. Volume II Part 2: Advaita Vedanta', Delhi: Centre for Studies in Civilizations
- Suzuki, Daisetz Teitaro (1957), Mysticism: Christian and Buddhist, Allen & Unwin
- Gabriel Théry, "Édition critique des piéces relatives au procés d'Eckhart continues dans le manuscrit 33b de la Bibliothèque de Soest", Archives d'histoire littéraire et doctrinal du moyen âge, 1 (1926), pp. 129–268.
- Tweed, Thomas A. (2005), "American Occultism and Japanese Buddhism. Albert J. Edmunds, D. T. Suzuki, and Translocative History" (PDF), Japanese Journal of Religious Studies, 32 (2): 249–281, archived from the original (PDF) on 22 May 2012
- James Midgely Clark, Meister Eckhart: An Introduction to the Study of His Works with an Anthology of His Sermons, Edinburgh: Thomas Nelson, 1957.
- Shizuteru Ueda, Die Gottesgeburt in der Seele und der Durchbruch zur Gottheit. Die mystische Anthropologie Meister Eckharts und ihre Konfrontation mit der Mystik des Zen-Buddhismus, Gütersloh: Mohn, 1965.
- Reiner Schürmann, Meister Eckhart: Mystic and Philosopher, Bloomington: Indiana University Press, 1978.
- Matthew Fox, ed., Breakthrough: Meister Eckhart's Creation Spirituality in New Translation, Garden City, New York: Doubleday, 1980.
- Bernard McGinn The Mystical Thought of Meister Eckhart: The Man from whom God Hid Nothing, (New York: Herder & Herder, 2001)
