= Book of Divine Consolation =

Book by Meister Eckhart

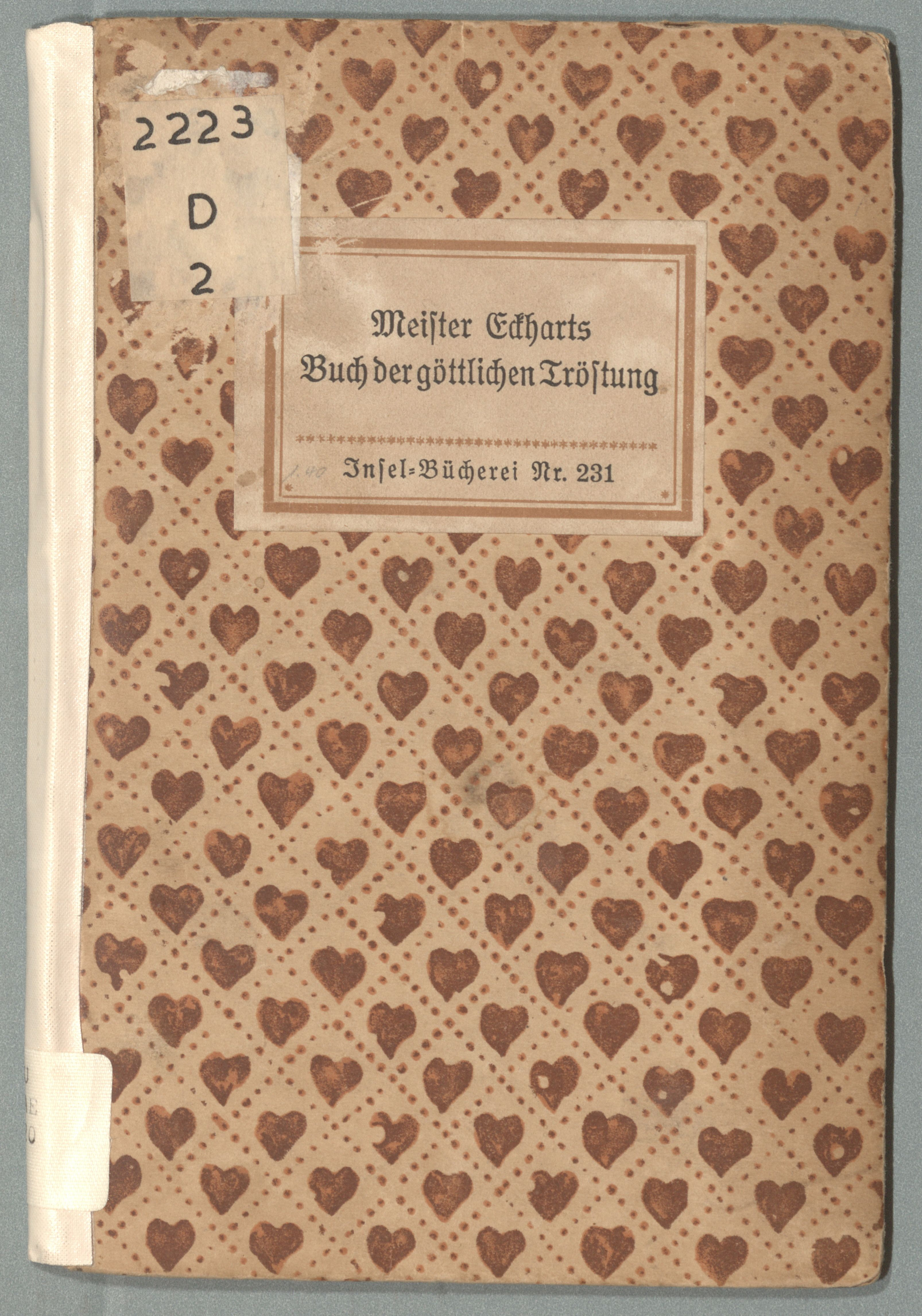
Book cover

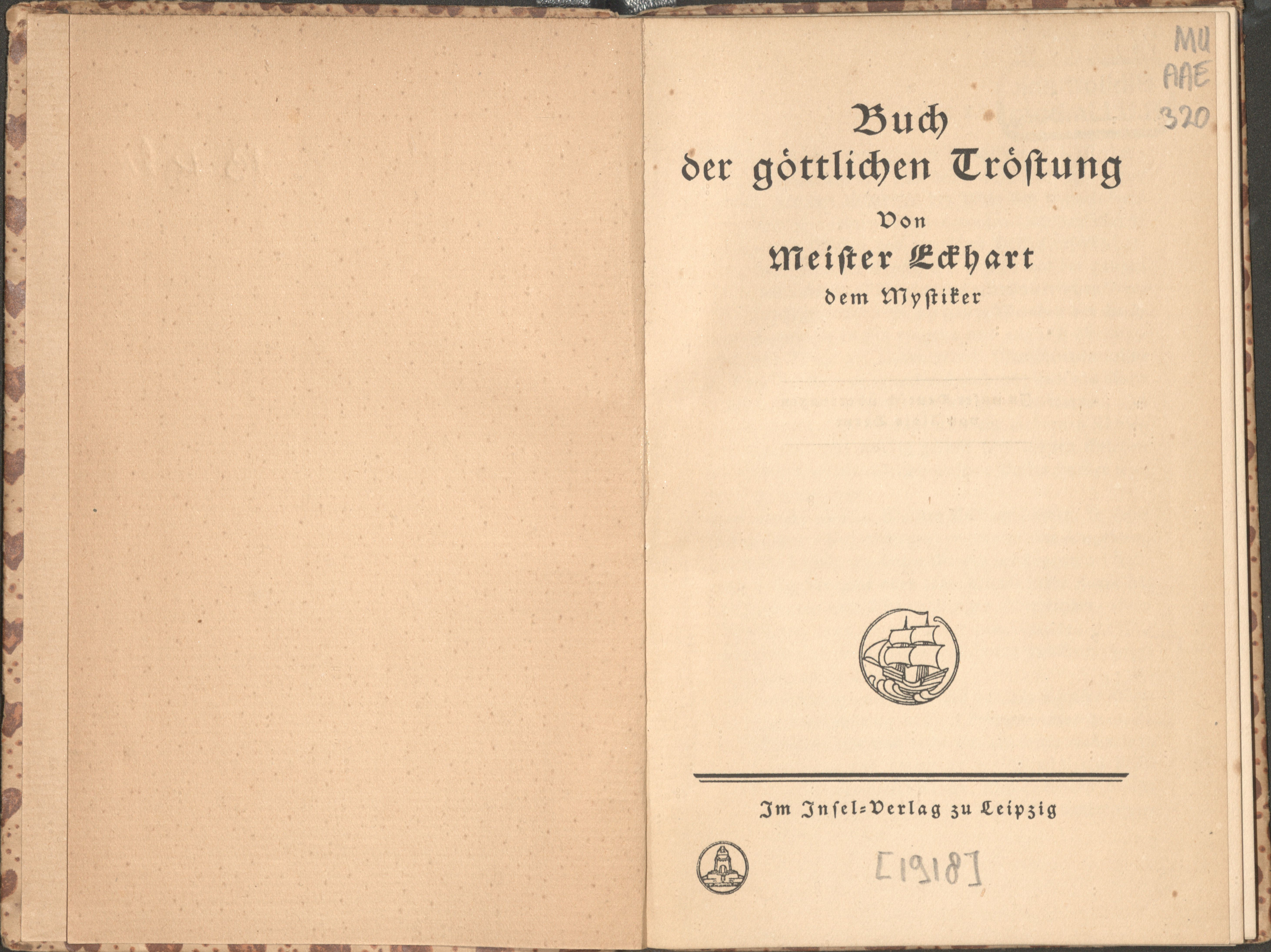
Title page of the book

The Book of Divine Consolation (German: Buch der göttlichen Tröstung) is a book by the German scholar and mystic Meister Eckhart (Eckhart von Hochheim), that dates back to somewhere between 1305 and 1326. It was likely partially intended as a gift for Agnes of Austria, though historians are unsure about the exact publication context. In the book the author aims to console the reader and gives around 30 reasons why a person should not be saddened by any misfortune. It was later referenced in the inquisitorial trial against Eckhart.

== Context ==
Eckhart joined the Dominican order around 1274, where he studied theology and eventually became a teacher himself. In 1302, Eckhart took up the external Dominican chair of theology at the University of Paris and became magister there. In 1311 Eckhart was sent to the university in Paris again to be magister, as appointed by the general chapter held at Naples. Being magister twice in Paris was a rare honour, only given to Thomas Aquinas before. Eckhart wrote many texts and poems both in German and Latin, usually advising people concerning the application of religious ideals to their lives. The origins of the majority of these texts are debated among historians, and the evidence that Eckhart is the real author is limited. They can also not be dated accurately, but since the Book of Divine Consolation was written in the later years of his life, most other writings are likely from before it. Eckhart also gave many sermons, of which many were published later in written form. They must have originated in his time as a teacher, which he was regularly between 1294 and 1327. The range of likely publication years makes it clear that Eckhart was already in an advanced stage of his career when he wrote the book, while it is not clear at what exact period Eckhart wrote the "Book of Divine Consolation", it was at an advanced stage in his career in the Dominican order after he had experience as a teacher and religious authority. This could potentially have been during his time in Strasbourg as Vicar general.

The book is assumed to have been a gift for the queen of Hungary Agnes of Austria. What the exact occasion was is not clear. It might have been when her sister in law died, which would date the book at around 1305. Other events in Agnes life that could have given reason for the gift are the murder of her father Albert I of Germany (1308), or the death of her mother Elisabeth of Carinthia (1313). Another estimated publication date is around 1314. Among the latest estimated publication dates is 1318, following the transportation of Agnes mothers remains to Königsfelden, which was also the beginning of a deeper interest in spirituality for Agnes. Another theory is that Eckhart only finished the book around 1326, but that earlier versions were published and gifted to Agnes. This theory is based on the fact that in the church-process against Eckhart that had been going on in the last years of his life, no excerpts from the last ten pages were referenced. Another supporting hint for this theory is that in the end of the book, the author criticises the opinion of "some coarse person", who would say that some things in the book are false and that these teachings should not be for uneducated people. This could also be a response to the criticism of the church to earlier parts of the book. While Agnes appears to be one target audience of the book, it is also written for a more general audience of people seeking consolation. The book does not address Agnes directly and is not a commissioned work. The book was given the title "Buch der göttlichen Tröstung" in a later written record, while the book itself never speaks of a "devine consolation". Before that it was simply referred to as "Trostbuch" (Consolation-book).

== Contents ==
The Book of Divine Consolation intends to console the reader and convince them that their sadness, wherever it may stem from, is superfluous. It is structured in three parts, proceeded by a short introduction. The introduction starts with defining the three circumstances that make humans sad and announces the three main parts of the book, which are structured independently of the previously mentioned three reasons for sadness. The author categorizes reasons for sadness as 1: damage or loss of things someone owns, 2: damage or loss of people close to a person, and 3: harm coming directly to the person themselves, for example an illness.

In the first main part the author reasons for how a good lifestyle frees a person of all sorrow and sadness. The main argument is that God is goodness, justice, virtue and all other positive characteristics. By becoming one with God and following Jesus' way, the believer internalizes God and in that way becomes goodness, justice, etc. themself. All these virtues are above anything material that a person could possibly become sad about. Hence, all reasons for sadness no longer make the person sad, as nothing can make goodness itself sad. The only reason people get sad in the first place is because they love worldly material things (including other people) too much and more than God. This is like wanting to own something that only God can own, which will inevitably lead to disappointment and sadness. The best way to live is to want what God wants and since whatever God wills happens, whatever happens is good. The only decent reason for sadness is to be sad not to have this oneness with God and not being free from material things. Since reaching this state is only possible by the grace of God, a person should however also not be sad not to have reached that state, since it is the will of God.

The second part consists of around 30 smaller reasons for being at peace and grateful instead of sad. These are often changes of perspective, for example remembering that every bad thing that happens is a test, and the people God loves the most get the most difficult lives, or being grateful to still have 60 pieces when you lost 40 out of 100 instead of remembering the ones you lost. These are just two examples from the book.

The last part of the book gives examples of people who reached the described state of fully accepting everything that happens. These include instances of sick people not praying for better health because they knew it to be God’s will and ultimately good for them, for example to learn something. In the last paragraphs, the author says that some will not believe what is written in the book, and that some people want to hide their own blindness by making others blind. He also criticizes Seneca, who says such high and important topics should only be discussed with a great soul and much sense, and others after him who think that these topics are not for uneducated people. The author says that, if that were true, nobody would ever learn anything.

== Reception ==
Excerpts from the book (among other works of Eckhart) were later used in the inquisition trial against Eckhart. They were used by prosecutors to support their claim that Eckhart's teachings contained heresy. The excerpt are primarily passages in which Eckhart talks about the oneness with God and how to achieve it. This was against the practices of the church at that time, which seemed to have followers strongly attached to the church and dependent on it to seek God. These critical passages from this book and other works of Eckhart can be found on a list dating back to the trial against Eckhart, which also contains responses of Eckhart. This also proofs that this book is one of Eckhart's own works. Though parts of Eckhart's teachings were in the end deemed heretical, Eckhart had already died at that point. Eckhart supposedly fully revoked his problematic opinions before he died, as the persecutors announced later.

The book is also subject of research into Eckhart's works and German mysticism in general. "Bibliographie zu Meister Eckhart" (English: Bibliography of Master Eckhart) by Niklaus Largier from 1989 examines the occasion and writing-date of the Book of Divine Consolation. "Meister Eckharts Strassburger Jahrzehnt" (English: Master Eckhart's Strasbourg decade) by Gottschall et al. from 2008 and "Meister Eckhart: Theologe, Prediger, Mystiker" (English: Master Eckhart: Theologist, preacher and mystic) by Kurt Ruh from 1989 are both exploring the life and career of Eckhart. They also investigate the Book of Divine Consolation and the circumstances of its publication. A more general work regarding German mysticism is "Geschichte der abendländischen Mystic. 3: Die Mystik des deutschen Predigerordens und ihre Grundlegung durch die Hochscholastik" (English: History of Western Mysticism. 3: The mysticism of the German order of preachers and its foundation through high scholasticism) by Kurt Ruh from 1995, which includes a section regarding the Book of Divine Consolation and theorises about the role Agnes of Hungary played as the potential recipient of the book as a gift. The book has also been referenced by works investigating the trial against Eckhart, namely "Eckardus theutonicus, homo doctus et sanctus: Nachweise und Berichte zum Prozess gegen Meister Eckhart" (English: Eckardus theutonicus, homo doctus et sanctus: evidence and reports on the trial against Meister Eckhart) by Stirnimann and Imbach from 1992.

After the labeling of parts of Eckhart's works as being heresy through the trial against him, they became controversial. Still they were widely quoted and spread during the late Middle Ages, especially under Dominicans, Franciscans and Augustinians. Eckhart was also anonymously quoted and his influence is recognisable in many works of other authors of the 14th century. Eckhart was quoted by, among others, Johannes Tauler, Nicolas von Landau or Marquand von Lindau, who were also Christian theologists. There he was often defended. During that time, Eckhart was a popular figure for common people who saw him as a wise master. They spread stories about his life and quoted his teachings in laymen wisdoms. Since his works were of a free-spirited nature, they were also used by laymen to defend against paternalism by the church and to claim their own right of interpreting theology. In this context, the inquisition and Persecutions of heretics was also criticised. A lot of these works are in the form of fictional dialogues between Eckhart and a layman, in which his views find support. In the Netherlands, Eckhart's then popular teachings faced backlash by the piety movement in the 14th century. There Eckhart was criticised as a false prophet and seen as a bad influence. In the 15th century, Nicholas of Cusa became interested in Eckhart's works and described them as intelligent, but only suitable for an educated audience. In the 19th century Eckhart became more popular again and was praised for his thoughts by Schopenhauer and Hegel. Schopenhauer wrote that Eckhart had great thoughts but was limited in that he had to share them through a christian framework. Heinrich Denifle protested against the new popularity of Eckhart in the late nineteen hundreds, and defended the condemnation of Eckhart by the inquisition. In the 20th century, Eckhart remained popular with the common people. He also found even more support with Anti-dogmatist and some theologists who disagreed with Denifle and valued Eckhart's free thinking. Eckhart's works also found supporters in the National Socialist movement. Alfred Rosenberg saw Eckhart as his most important precursor and important figure in Germanic history as well as founder of a new religion. Marxist thinkers saw Eckhart as a precursor of Atheism and Materialism, since he equated the individual with God and went against the necessity of a church between man and God.
