= Tauler =

Tauler is a Catalan surname. Notable people with the surname include:

- Cristóbal Tauler (1894–?), Spanish Olympic sports shooter
- Johannes Tauler (c. 1300–1361), German mystic theologian
- Toni Tauler (born 1974), Spanish cyclist
