= Book of the Nine Rocks =

14th century German mystical text

- Author: Rulman Merswin (attributed)
- Subject: The soul's mystical path to God
- Genre: Christian mysticism
- Publication date: 14th century
- Publication place: Germany
- Media type: Religious text

The Book of the Nine Rocks is an anonymous 14th century German mystical text.

== Contents ==
The Book of the Nine Rocks uses the metaphor of jumping from rock to rock to illustrate the soul's journey to God. Each rock represents a higher level of spirituality and each is more difficult to reach. While most men do not escape Satan's snares and fall back into worldliness, the few who attain the highest rock transcend desire and self-will to realize their divine nature and become one with God.

== Authorship ==
The text is uncertainly attributed to Rulman Merswin, who was associated with the Friends of God.

== See also ==
- Friends of God
- Christian mystics
