= Karl Albert =

German philosopher

- Born: 2 October 1921; Neheim, Weimar Republic
- Died: 9 October 2008 (aged 87); Cologne, Germany
- Occupations: Philosopher, Professor

Education
- Education: University of Cologne, University of Bonn
- Thesis: On the Aesthetics of the Sublime in German Idealism (1950)
- Doctoral advisor: Erich Rothacker
- Other advisor: Joseph Koch

Philosophical work
- Era: 20th Century
- Institutions: Bergische Universität Wuppertal, Ruhr-Universität Bochum, Pädagogischen Hochschule Rheinland, Thomas-Institut in Cologne
- Language: German
- Main interests: Aesthetics, German Idealism, Linguistics, Classics
- Notable works: On the Aesthetics of the Sublime in German Idealism

Karl Albert (2 October 1921 – 9 October 2008) was a German philosopher and professor emeritus at Bergische Universität Wuppertal.

Born in Neheim, a borough of the Westphalia town of Arnsberg, Albert studied at University of Cologne and University of Bonn. His 1950 dissertation On the Aesthetics of the Sublime in German Idealism was written under the supervision of professor Erich Rothacker at University of Bonn. In the years 1952–1955 he was an assistant of Joseph Koch (a Meister Eckhart scholar) at Thomas-Institut in Cologne. 1958–1970 he taught philosophy at a local Gymnasium. In this period he majored in linguistics and classics. Then until 1972 he was a Lehrbeauftragter at the Ruhr-Universität in Bochum. In 1973 he was appointed Professor of Philosophy at the Pädagogischen Hochschule Rheinland. In 1980 he changed to Wuppertal's Bergischen Universität. Albert died in Cologne a week past his 87th birthday.

== Works ==
- 1950 Die Lehre vom Erhabenen in der Ästhetik des deutschen Idealismus (dissertation)
- 1968 Philosophie der modernen Kunst
- 1974 Die ontologische Erfahrung
- 1975 Zur Metaphysik Lavelles
- 1976 Meister Eckharts These vom Sein
- 1977 Spirituelle Poesie
- 1978 Hesiod, Theogonie, Ratingen
- 1980 Griechische Religion und platonische Philosophie
- 1981 Das gemeinsame Sein
- 1982 Vom Kult zum Logos
- 1984 Philosophische Pädagogik
- 1986 Mystik und Philosophie
- 1988 Meister Eckhart: Kommentar zum Buch der Weisheit
- 1988 Philosophische Studien I: Philosophie der Philosophie
- 1989 Platons Begriff der Philosophie
- 1989 Philosophische Studien II: Philosophie der Kunst
- 1990 Philosophische Studien V: Philosophie der Erziehung
- 1991 Philosophische Studien III: Philosophie der Religion
- 1992 Philosophische Studien IV: Philosophie der Sozialität
- 1995 Lebensphilosophie. Von den Anfängen bei Nietzsche bis zu ihrer Kritik bei Lucács
- 1996 Einführung in die philosophische Mystik
- 2000 Philosophie als Form des Lebens (with Elenor Jain).
- 2003 Die Utopie der Moral. Versuch einer kulturübergreifenden ontologischen Ethik (with Elenor Jain).
