= Nicholas of Strasburg =

Nicholas of Strasburg was an Alsatian mystic of the Dominican Order from Strasbourg (Strassburg), active in the first half of the 14th century. He was appointed visitator of the German province of the Dominicans by Pope John XXII and took over as inquisitor in the process against Master Eckhart, acquitting him. His major literary work, Summa Philosophiae, is designed as an introduction to philosophical problems for those studying for the Order. Nicholas' manual was written with the aim of establishing a Thomistic approach, which in the early 14th century in Germany meant going up against the alternative philosophical culture represented by Dietrich of Freiberg and Meister Eckhart.
