= Friends of God =

Medieval mystical group

The Friends of God (German: Gottesfreunde; also gotesvriunde) was a medieval mystical group of both ecclesiastical and lay persons within the Catholic Church (though it nearly became a separate sect) and a center of German mysticism. It was founded between 1339 and 1343 during the Avignon Papacy, a time of great turmoil for the Catholic Church. The Friends of God were originally centered in Basel, Switzerland and were also fairly important in Strasbourg and Cologne. Some late-nineteenth century writers made large claims for the movement, seeing it both as influential in fourteenth-century mysticism and as a precursor of the Protestant Reformation. Modern studies of the movement have emphasised the derivative and often second-rate character of its mystical literature, and its limited impact on medieval literature in Germany. Some of the movement's ideas still prefigured the Protestant reformation.

== Name ==
The name "Friends of God" may have been influenced by various sources. A number of biblical passages use the term (e.g. Judges 8:22, James 2:23, Exodus 33:11, Psalm 138:17, Wisdom 7:27, Luke 12:4, and John 15:15). The concept of friendship with God had also been applied by various medieval authors, and particularly among Meister Eckhart and his followers.

== History ==
The movement grew out of the preaching and teaching of Meister Eckhart, and especially his Dominican spiritual heirs, the preacher John Tauler and the writer Henry Suso. An influence on the Friends of God, although remaining in the background, was the secular priest Henry of Nördlingen, from the Bavarian Oberland, who met Tauler and Suso in Basel in 1339. Henry had a great deal of interaction with other Bavarian and German mystics and introduced the Friends of God to The Flowing Light of the Godhead by Mechthild of Magdeburg.

The group achieved a nascent institutional form in 1367 when wealthy layman Rulman Merswin purchased and restored a derelict monastery in Strasbourg known as the grünenwörth ('Green Isle'). Grünenwörth served as a refuge for study for the Friends of God and as a “school of prophets” which produced a number of mystical texts. Merswin is suspected of being the anonymous author The Friend of God from the Oberland.

The Friends of God, as led by Tauler and Suso, sought a mystical path in line with established Catholic doctrine, following Thomas Aquinas. Rulman Merswin, under the guidance of The Friend of God from the Oberland, wanted to purify the Church. This stress on reform brought The Friends of God into conflict with the Church and not long after Merswin’s death in 1382, they were condemned.

After Merswin's death, some sources claim that Nicholas of Basel became the leader. He was eventually burned at the stake with two of his followers for heresy at Vienna around 1395. The relationship of Nicholas of Basel to the Friends of God is unclear as he was condemned as a Beghard.

Another prominent member, Martin of Mainz, a follower of Nicholas of Basel, was also burned for heresy in 1393.

== Beliefs ==
Many leaders of the group were executed for heresy because they criticized the corruption of Catholicism: they believed that there would soon be judgment from God on the church. The group was a democratic lay movement, and they held holiness, love, piety and devotion as important. The movement was a mysticist movement and they held great importance in rescuing other peoples' souls.

== Texts ==
A number of mystical texts are associated with The Friends of God, most notably the Theologia Germanica and the Book of the Nine Rocks. Many of the works were attributed to The Friend of God from the Oberland, although probably written by Rulman Merswin himself.

== See also ==
- Margaretha Ebner
- The Friend of God from the Oberland
- Theologia Germanica
