= Rulman Merswin =

German mystic

Rulman Merswin (c. 1307 – 1382) was a German mystic, leader for a time of the Friends of God.

== Life ==
Born into a prominent family in Strasbourg, then a free city of the Holy Roman Empire. Rulman Merswin became a banker and accumulated considered wealth, At the age of 40, he left business and adopted a religious life as a layman, reportedly influenced by the Franciscan Tertiaries or Waldensians. He retained his fortune for religious purposes and later describes an ecstatic experience in which he believed he had risen from the ground and moved through a garden.

Although married to Gertrude of Bietenheim, Merswin resolved to remain celibate. This led to struggles against evil temptation, which he tried to quell through extreme ascetic practices. On the advice of Johannes Tauler, his confessor, Merswin gave up self-mortification. He then fell into severe depression, convinced he was destined for eternal damnation in the fires of Hell; however, he persevered and found, “the joy and peace of the Holy Spirit.” He heard voices and often fell into states of ecstasy. In The Story of the First Four Years of a New Life (which his secretary, Nikolaus von Löwen, claimed was found in a locked cabinet after Merswin's death), Merswin recounts a meeting with a mysterious Friend of God from the Oberland, a confessor, prophet and teacher, to whom Merswin submitted himself completely.

Johannes Tauler brought Merswin into the Friends of God, a lay religious society with a mystical focus.

In 1367, Merswin purchased an old cloister on an island near Strasbourg to serve as a refuge for study for the Friends of God and as a “school of prophets.” The house, which he called "das grüne Wört" or Grünenwörth ("the green island"), produced a number of mystical texts, such as the Book of the Nine Rocks. Many of the works were attributed to The Friend of God from the Oberland, although probably written by Merswin himself. In 1371, Grünenwörth was put under the care of the Knights of St. John.

The Friends of God, as led by Tauler and Henry Suso, sought a mystical path in line with established Catholic doctrine, following Thomas Aquinas. Rulman Merswin, under the guidance of The Friend of God from the Oberland, wanted to purify the Church. This stress on reform brought The Friends of God into conflict with the Church and not long after Merswin's death in 1382, they were condemned.

== See also ==
- Christian Mysticism
- Theologia Germanica
