= Margareta Ebner =

German Dominican nun and writer

Blessed Margareta Ebner O.P.
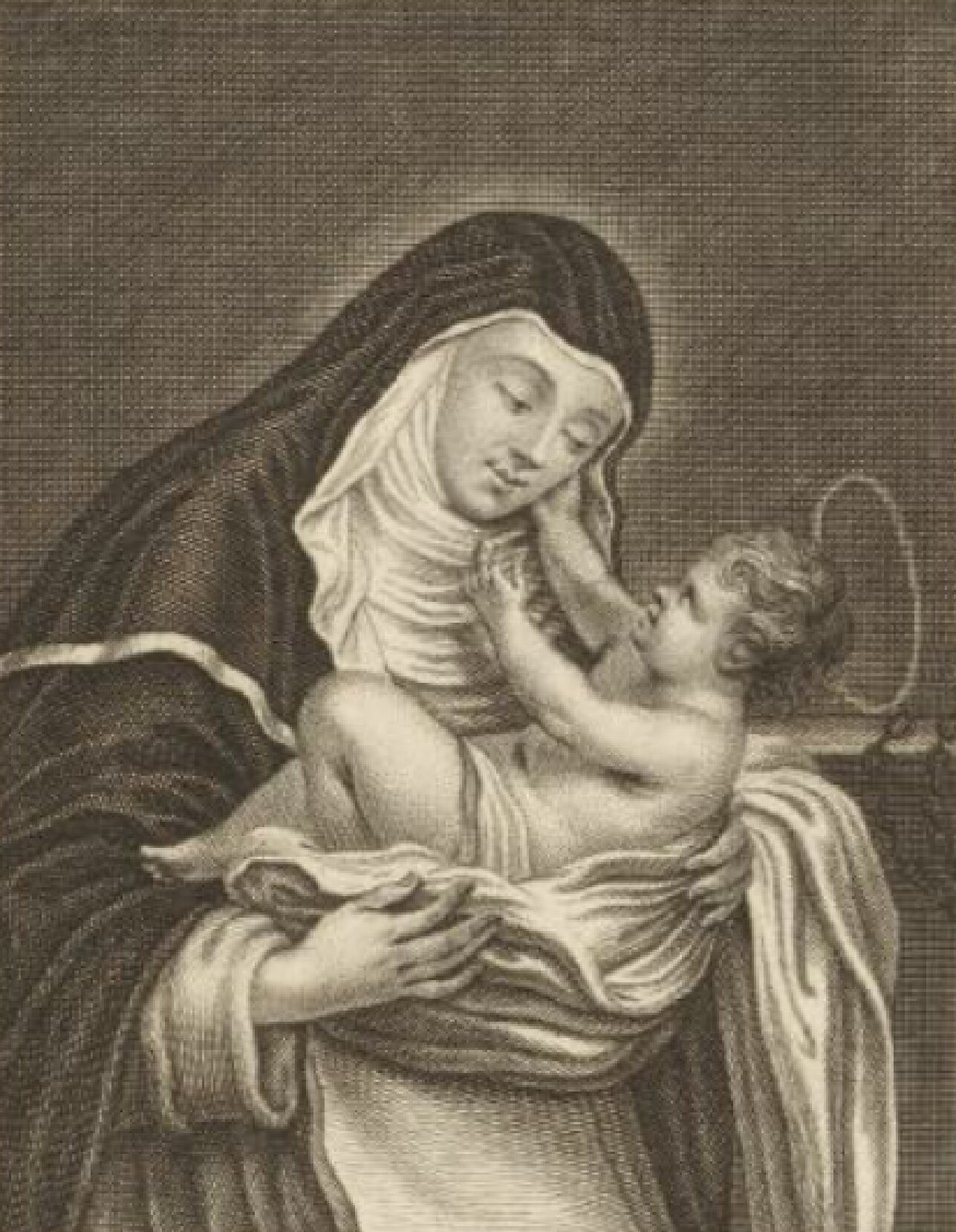

Religious; Mystic
- Born: 1291; Donauwörth, Duchy of Swabia
- Died: 20 June 1351 (aged 59–60); Mödingen, Prince-Bishopric of Augsburg
- Venerated in: Roman Catholic Church
- Beatified: 24 February 1979, Saint Peter's Square, Vatican City by Pope John Paul II
- Feast: 20 June
- Attributes: Dominican habit

Margareta Ebner (1291 – 20 June 1351) was a German professed religious from the Dominican Nuns. Beginning in 1311, Ebner experienced a series of spiritual visions in which Jesus Christ gave her messages which she recorded in letters and a journal at the behest of her spiritual director. Much of Ebner's religious life took place amidst a period of bitter feuding between Pope John XXII and Holy Roman Emperor Louis the Bavarian, in which she and her convent faithfully backed Louis.

Ebner's beatification cause began in the 1600s well after her death though stalled for a time until 1910 when the initial process was concluded; Pope John Paul II beatified Ebner in 1979 after confirming her longstanding "cultus" – or popular devotion to her – rather than recognizing a miracle as would be the norm.

== Life ==
Margareta Ebner was born circa 1291 in Donauwörth to aristocratics; she received a thorough education in her home. In about 1305 she entered the Kloster Mödingen convent of the Dominican Nuns near Dillingen and made her profession around 1306.

From 1312 to 1325 she suffered a grave illness and in her later Revelations described how she had "no control over herself" and often would laugh or weep on a constant level with sometimes little reprieve. This illness was the stimulus for her conversion to a deeper spiritual life of devotion to God. This illness seemed to even put her at the point of death on occasion and even when she seemed to recover she still remained in bed for well over a decade. It was from 1311 that she began to experience her visions of Jesus Christ who graced her with messages. Ebner became prone to further bouts of illness for the remainder of her life. But she could exercise her desire for penance and mortification via abstinence from wine and fruit as well as bathing which were considered some of the greatest pleasures of life in that time.

In the 1320s, the perennial feud between pope and Holy Roman Emperor ramped up again. John XXII excommunicated Louis the Bavarian and placed the empire under an interdict; Louis appointed his own pope. The convent's members were forced to disperse for safety during Louis IV's campaign against the papal forces. Ebner took refuge at her old home with her relations. Upon her return her nurse died and she grieved without consolation until the secular priest Heinrich von Nördlingen assumed her spiritual direction in 1332.

But her confessor was often absent due to his personal allegiance to the pope. The correspondence that passed between them is the first collection of this kind in the German language. At his command – beginning during the Advent of 1344 – she began to write with her own hand a full account of all her revelations and her conversation with the Infant Jesus as well as all the answers that she had received from him including those given to her in her sleep. Ebner also wrote her visions in the Swabian dialect.

This journal is preserved in a manuscript in 1353 at Medingen. Ebner also had extensive correspondence with the noted Dominican theologian and preacher Johannes Tauler as well as Christina Ebner (no relation). Tauler was considered the leader of the spiritual movement dubbed the Friends of God. Through her connection with him she has become identified as part of this movement. From her letters and journal it is learned that she never abandoned her compassion for the Emperor Louis whose soul she learned in a vision had been saved.

Ebner died on 20 June 1351. Her remains are now interred in her old convent in a chapel that had been constructed in 1755.

== Beatification ==
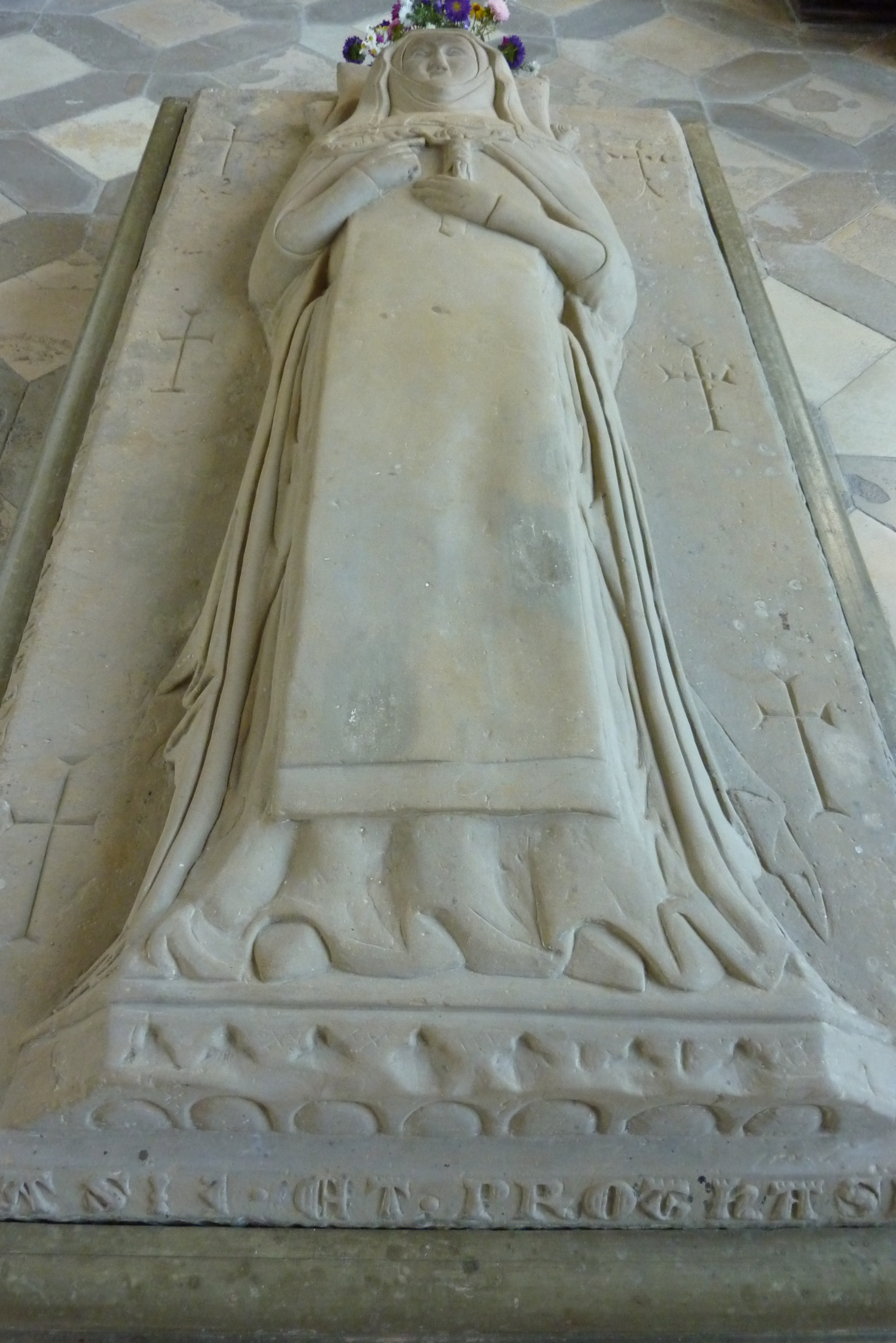
Ebner's tomb in her old convent.

The beatification cause opened in Augsburg in an informative process in 1686 though this seemed to be stalled at some stage until it was later closed centuries later in 1910. Theologians declared on 14 March 1952 that her writings and letters adhered to official doctrine. Historians assigned to the cause also approved it on 12 June 1963 before the Congregation for the Causes of Saints and their consultants approved the cause on 9 May 1978. The C.C.S. alone then approved the cause on 7 November 1978.

Ebner was beatified on 24 February 1979 after Pope John Paul II confirmed her longstanding and local "cultus" – or popular devotion" – which meant that no miracle would be required for her to be beatified as is the norm.

== Spiritual works ==
Ebner's experiences are mainly recorded in the Revelations (or "Offenbarungen") which she composed in 1344–48 with the encouragement of her spiritual advisor Heinrich; it was in this that she recounted the spiritual graces she had received between 1312 and 1348. There are about seven manuscripts which have survived.

There also remain 56 letters that Heinrich had written to Ebner which survive in a single late manuscript though one of her letters to him still survives.

The Revelations preserved in Ebner's own hand became widely known in the 18th century thanks to a selection of her manuscript letters and memoirs compiled by Eustachius Eichenhut. His work is one of the earliest printed expositions of the mystic's doctrines and work.

== See also ==
- Friends of God
