= The Friend of God from the Oberland =

Mysterious character in medieval German mysticism

The Friend of God from the Oberland (Der Gottesfreund vom Oberland, sometimes translated as "the friend of God from the Upland", or "the mysterious layman from the Oberland") was the name of a figure in Middle Ages German mysticism, associated with the Friends of God and the conversion of Johannes Tauler. His name comes from the Bernese Oberland.

== Identity ==
In Story of the First Four Years of a New Life, Rulman Merswin writes: "Of all the wonderful works which God had wrought in me I was not allowed to tell a single word to anybody until the time when it should please God to reveal to a man in the Oberland to come to me. When he came to me God gave me the power to tell him everything." The identity and personality of this "Friend of God". who looms so largely in the great collection of mystical literature, and is everywhere treated as a half supernatural character, is one of the most difficult problems in the history of mysticism.

The accounts of his life say that about 1343 he was forbidden to reveal his identity to anyone save Rulman Merswin. As all the writings bear the marks of a single authorship it has been assumed that "the Friend of God" is a literary creation of Merswin. and that Merswin (and his school) produced the entire body of work as tendency literature designed to set forth the ideals of the movement to which he had given his life. Thus "the great unknown" from the Oberland is the ideal character, "who illustrates how God does his work for the world and for the Church through a divinely trained and spiritually illuminated layman", just as William Langland in England about the same time drew the figure of Piers Plowman. Another theory is that Merswin had a dual personality and wrote the works ascribed to The Friend of God from the Oberland while in a dissociative state. A third hypothesis is that the works were compiled by Merswin's secretary, Nikolaus of Löwen. On Merswin's death, Nikolaus of Löwen came into a large collection of anonymous mystical works from the library of the Religious House of Grünenwörth, which he and Merswin had founded together, and apparently invented the mysterious Friend of God from the Oberland as the author.

== See also ==
- Friends of God
- German mysticism
- German Christian mystics
- Christian mystics
