= Katherina von Gebersweiler =

Katherina von Gebersweiler was a German Dominican who was active in the convent at Underlinden in the 1320s. She wrote a sisterbook entitled Vitae Sororum, which survives in manuscripts in Paris and Colmar.
