= Christina Ebner =

German Dominican nun, mystic and writer

Christina Ebner (also Christine), (26 March 1277 – 27 December 1356) was a German Dominican nun, writer and mystic.

== Life ==
Ebner was born in the Imperial City of Nuremberg, the child of the patrician Seyfried Ebner and his wife, Elizabeth Kuhdorf. In 1289, at the age of twelve, she entered the Monastery of St. John the Baptist in Engelthal, which was a community of nuns of the Dominican Second Order outside the city, in the Burgraviate of Nuremberg. Founded as a beguinage some fifty years earlier, over the next hundred years this monastery was to become a much-renowned center of spirituality and learning. According to some, it might very well have been the foremost center of mystical life during the early fourteenth century in Germany, if not all of Europe.

Less than a year later after her admission, Ebner fell gravely ill. This affliction would reappear up to three times a year for the next decade. Also, later, she frequently suffered from various illnesses. About this time, she began experiencing frequent religious visions, which her confessor, the friar Conrad of Füssen, encouraged her to write down. So she began writing her first book, Leben und Offenbarungen ( Life and Revelations) in 1317. She continued to work on it at least until 1324. In 1338, she began a correspondence with the secular priest Henry of Nördlingen, who was an enthusiastic propagator of mystic spirituality and literature. Through him, she started a correspondence with Margareta Ebner, who was also a Dominican nun actively involved in the spiritual movement of the period; but Margareta was no relative of Ebner's in spite of the same family name "Ebner".

Around 1340, Ebner started compiling the Book of Sisters (Schwesternbuch), a record of the mystical visions and life experiences of the other nuns in her monastery, called Von der genaden uberlast (Of the Burden of Grace). It can be attributed to Ebner based on a 1451 manuscript and belongs to a genre known as the Sister-books.

Between 1344 and 1352, she wrote a second book of Revelations (Offenbarungen). In it, she deals with historical and political events of the time such as the riots at Nuremberg in 1348; the earthquake of the same year; the outbreak of the Black Death; the Flagellants' processions of 1349; and the long quarrel between the Holy Roman Emperor Louis IV and the Holy See. Ebner does not limit herself to the role of a bystander. Instead, she takes a deep interest in the events, develops her own opinions about them and even actively tries to influence their course. By that time, her reputation had spread widely through Northern Europe. In 1350, the Emperor Charles IV himself came to visit her at the monastery, seeking her guidance and prayers.

In 1351 she was finally visited for the first time by her long-time confidant, Henry of Nördlingen, who spent three weeks as a visitor to the monastery. At that time he gave her a copy of Mechthild's of Magdeburg mystic work Das fließende Licht der Gottheit (The Flowing Light of the Godhead), which is found reflected in her own later works and in those of the other nuns in the community.

Ebner died in her monastery at Engelthal on 27 December 1356, in her 67th year of monastic life.

== Works ==
- Der Nonne von Engelthal Büchlein von der genaden uberlast (vor 1350)

== Literature ==
- Hindsley, Leonard Patrick (1998). The Mystics of Engelthal: Writings from a Medieval Monastery. New York: St. Martin's Press. ISBN 0-312-16251-0.

This article incorporates text from the public domain Catholic Encyclopedia.
