= German mysticism =

Form of Christian mysticism

German mysticism, sometimes called Dominican mysticism, Rhineland mysticism or Rheno-Flemish mysticism, was a late medieval Christian mystical movement that was especially prominent within the Dominican order and in Germany. It has its origins in the work of Meister Eckhart, Johannes Tauler, and Henry Suso. Other notable figures include Rulman Merswin and Margaretha Ebner, and the Friends of God.

This movement often seems to stand in stark contrast with scholasticism and German Theology, but the relationship between scholasticism and German mysticism is debated. Viewed as a predecessor of the reformation, the contrast becomes very apparent. For example, the use of an approachable vernacular stands in stark contrast to the constrained Latin of the Scholastics, the increased focus on the laity stands in contrast to the more deeply sacramental understanding of the Church, and these elements are both taken up and transformed in the writings of Martin Luther. German mysticism can also be viewed as a practical application of Scholasticism. Though Meister Eckhart is most well known for his popular German sermons, he also wrote a lengthy philosophical exposition of the same teachings in Latin. Some scholars have read him as a rather orthodox Thomist, seeing his mysticism as flowing naturally from established teachings through Eckhart's own idiosyncrasies and exaggerations.

Some of the movement's characteristics:

- A focus on laymen as well as clerics
- An emphasis on instruction and preaching
- Downplaying asceticism
- A focus on the New Testament rather than the Old Testament
- A use of the vernacular (German and Dutch) rather than Latin or Hebrew

Some in the movement came under criticism by the Church for heterodox or heretical opinions.

The Devotio Moderna was developed in opposition to the Rhineland mystics.
