= Johannes Tauler =

German Catholic priest and theologian (died 1361)

The Reverend Johannes Tauler OP
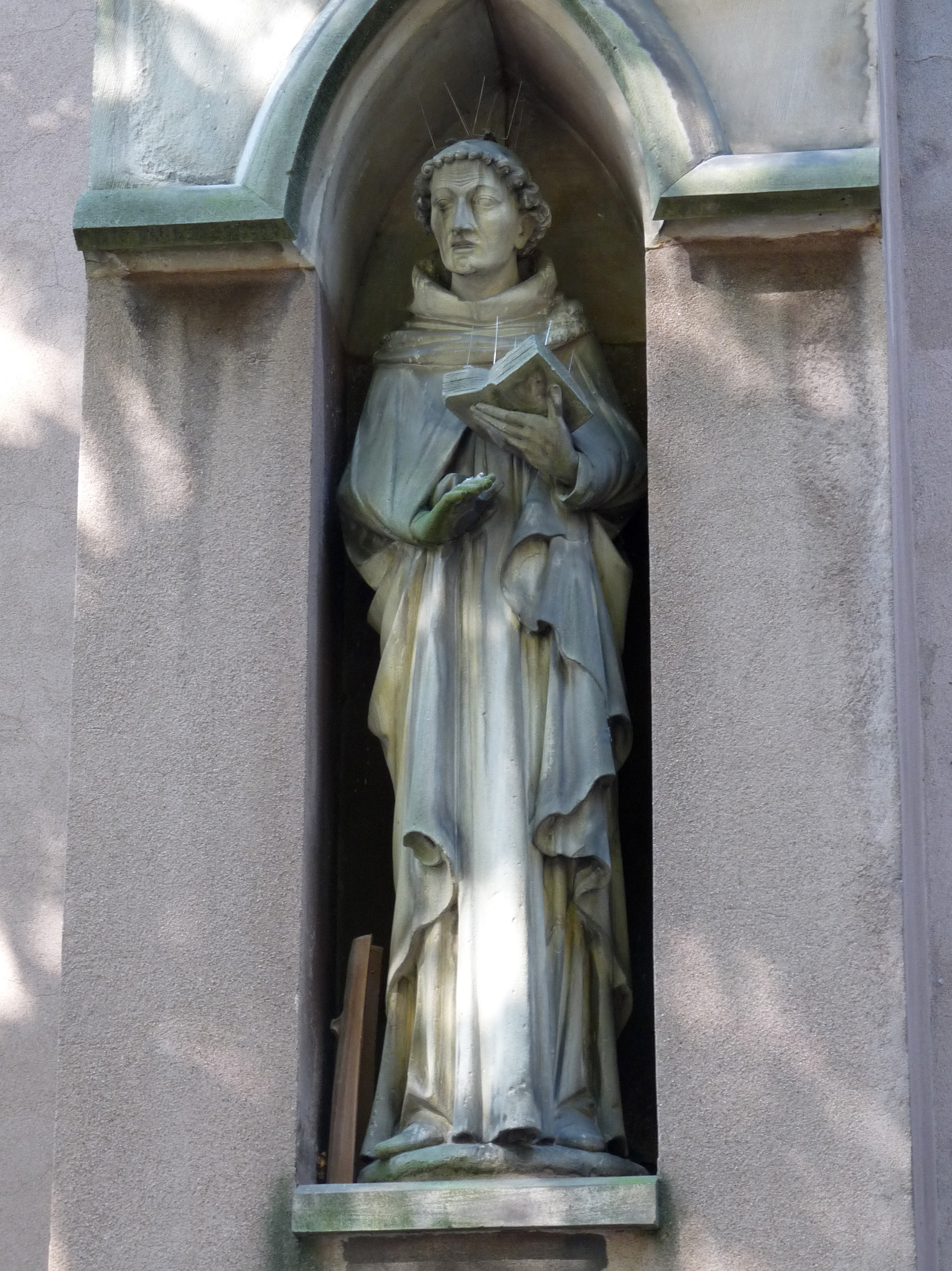
- Statue of Johannes Tauler, the Strasbourg Saint-Pierre-le-Jeune Protestant Church.
- Born: c. 1300; Strasbourg
- Died: 16 June 1361; Strasbourg
- Occupations: German mystic, Catholic priest, theologian
- Title: Doctor Illuminatus et sublimis

Johannes Tauler OP (c. 1300 – 16 June 1361) was a German mystic, a Catholic priest and a theologian. He belonged to the Dominican order. Tauler was known as one of the most important Rhineland mystics. He promoted a certain neo-platonist dimension in the Dominican spirituality of his time.

== Life ==
He was born about the year 1300 in Strasbourg, and seems to have been the son of Nikolus Tauler or Taweler, of Finkweiler (now Finckwiller st.), who in 1304 was a member of the Strasbourg city council. He entered the Dominican order at the age of about eighteen, and was educated at the Dominican convent in that city. Meister Eckhart, who greatly influenced him, was active in Strasbourg between about 1313 and 1326, though it is unclear what relationship they may have had. It is possible that while taking the customary eight-years' course of study at the monastery he heard Eckhart preach. From Strasbourg he went to the Dominican college of Cologne, and perhaps to St. James's College, Paris, ultimately returning to Strasbourg, but more probably he returned from Cologne to Strasbourg.

Around 1330 Tauler began his preaching career in Strasbourg. The city contained eight convents of Dominican nuns and perhaps seventy smaller beguine communities. It seems likely that (as with Meister Eckhart and Henry Suso), much of his preaching was directed to holy women. Most of Tauler's nearly eighty sermons seem to reflect a convent situation, although this may partly reflect the setting in which such sermons were most likely to be written down and preserved.

In 1338 or 1339 the Dominicans were exiled from Strasbourg as a result of the tensions between Pope John XXII and Louis IV. Tauler spent his exile (c. 1339–1343) in Basel. Here, he became acquainted with the circles of devout clergy and laity known as the Friends of God (Gottesfreunde). Tauler mentions the Friends of God often in his sermons. Evidence for further connections with this group is found in the letters exchanged between the secular priest Henry of Nördlingen and his spiritual friend, the Dominican nun Margaret Ebner. Through Henry, Tauler also became acquainted with Mechthild of Magdeburg's Flowing Light of the Godhead.

Tauler worked with the Friends of God, and it was with them that he taught his belief that the state of the soul was affected more by a personal relationship with God than by external practices. In this way, he was more of a proselytizer than his counterpart, Eckhart.

Tauler returned to Strasbourg around 1343, but the following years brought various crises. Strasbourg experienced a devastating earthquake and fire in 1346. From late 1347 until 1349, the city was ravaged by the Black Death. It is said that when the city was deserted by all who could leave it, Tauler remained at his post, encouraging his terror-stricken fellow-citizens with sermons and personal visits.

Tauler travelled fairly extensively in the last two and a half decades of his life. He made several trips to Cologne. A number of his sermons were clearly delivered there, as indicated by their survival in the Cologne dialect of Middle High German. A credible tradition suggests he visited John of Ruusbroec in Groenendaal at some point in the 1350s.

He is credited with composing the words of the Advent song, Es kommt ein Schiff, geladen. The oldest existing text source is a manuscript dated before 1450, found in the Strasbourg Dominican convent of St. Nicolaus in undis, which Tauler was known to have visited frequently. There are also some stylistic similarities to his other writings.

According to tradition, Tauler died on 16 June 1361 in Strasbourg. He was buried in the Dominican church in Strasbourg with an incised gravestone that still survives in the Temple Neuf.

The well-known story of Tauler's conversion and discipline by "The Friend of God from the Oberland" cannot be regarded as historical.

== Sermons ==
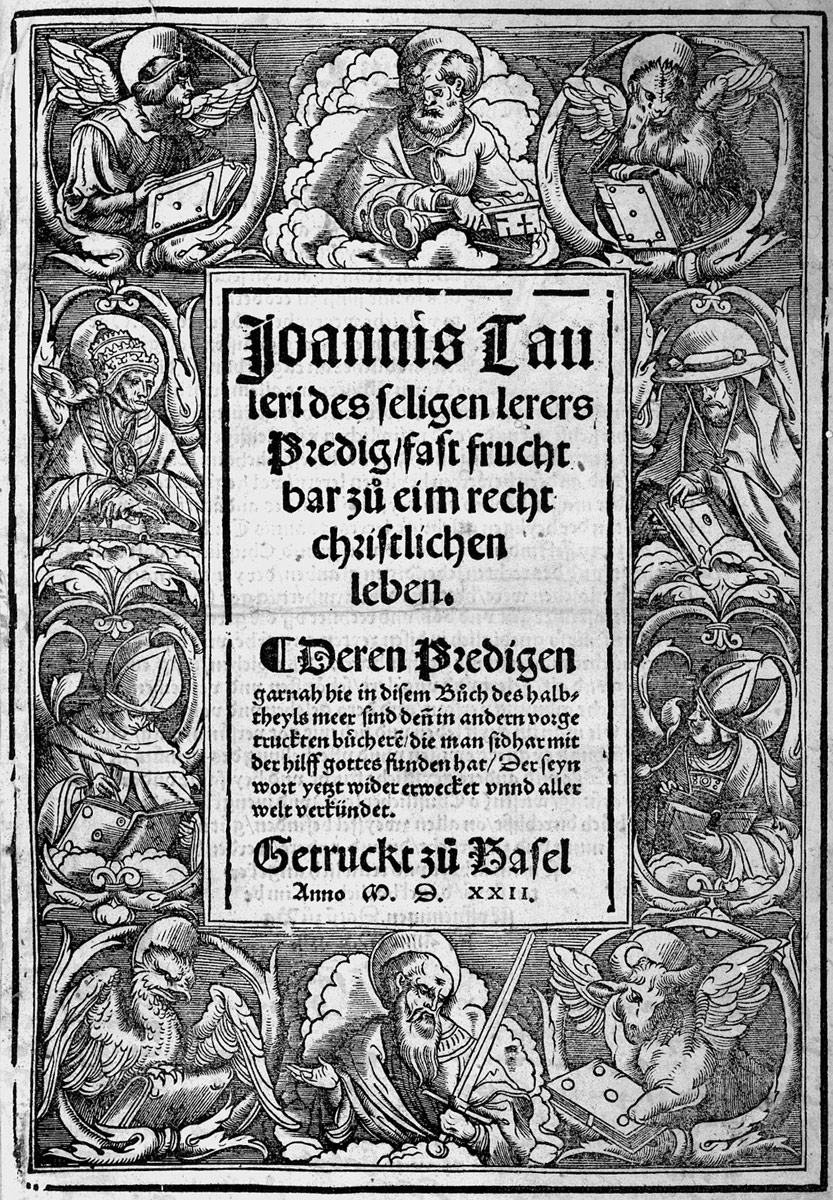
1522 title page of Tauler's sermons, by Holbein

Tauler left no formal treatises, either in Latin or the vernacular. Rather, his oeuvre consists of eighty sermons.

Tauler's sermons began to be collected in his own lifetime – three fourteenth-century manuscripts date from around the time of Tauler's return to Strasbourg after his exile in Basel.

Tauler's sermons were printed first in Leipzig in 1498, reprinted in 1508 at Augsburg, and then again with additions from Eckhart and others at Basel (1521 and 1522), at Halberstadt (1523), at Cologne (1543), and in Lisbon (1551). A Latin translation was printed first at Cologne in 1548 and 1553. In the nineteenth century, editions were produced by Julius Hamberger (Frankfurt, 1864) and Ferdinand Vetter (Berlin, 1910, reprinted Dublin/Zürich, 1968).

Tauler was famous for his sermons, which were considered among the noblest in the German language—not as emotional as Henry Suso's, nor as speculative as Eckhart's, but rather intensely practical, and touching on all sides the deeper problems of the moral and spiritual life.

Tauler has at times been claimed as one of several notable Christian universalists in the Middle Ages, along with Amalric of Bena and John of Ruysbroeck. His teaching that, "All beings exist through the same birth as the Son, and therefore shall they all come again to their original, that is, God the Father" has been cited in defense of this claim. However, other passages from his sermons cast doubt on such an interpretation. In his first sermon for the Feast of the Ascension he remarks, "The wicked come close to Heaven and never enter in. The greatest torment of the damned, is the certainty that they shall never enter Heaven."

== See also ==
- Ground of the Soul
- List of Latin nicknames of the Middle Ages: Doctors in theology
- Tauler

== Modern editions ==
There are various foreign language editions of the sermons:

- Ferdinand Vetter, Die Predigten Taulers, (Berlin: Weidmann, 1910; photomechanical reprint, 1968), is based on only a few manuscripts and does not adhere to the proper liturgical order of the sermons. It lists a few variant readings, but lacks an apparatus of sources. Several of its sermons are not authentic.
- A complete French translation exists as E Hugueny, G Thery and A-L Corin, Sermons de Tauler: Traduction faite sur les plus anciens mss. allemands, 3 volumes, (Paris, 1927–35).
- Georg Hofmann, Johannes Tauler: Predigten, (Freiburg: Herder, 1961; reprint, Einsiedeln, 1979) provides a helpful German version, but not a critical version of the Middle High German text.
- Johannes Tauler, De Preken, a complete Dutch translation by Peter Freens (2015), Taulerpreken.nl.

A good English translation of Tauler's sermons is lacking.

- Spiritual Conferences by Johann Tauler, OP (1300–1361), trans Eris Colledge and Sister Mary Jane, OP, (New York: Herder, 1961; reprint 1978), contains a rather loose translation of sermons and excerpts of sermons from Vetter. It rearranges that according to theological headings rather than keeping the order of the sermons themselves.
- Johannes Tauler, sermons, translation by Maria Shrady; introduction by Josef Schmidt, (New York: Paulist Press, 1985), translates 23 sermons, but from the modern German edition of Hofmann, not directly from the Middle High German. The version also contains various omissions and errors, and lacks notes.

Older English translations of Tauler include various inauthentic pieces, and were often made from the Latin version of Laurentius Surius. They are therefore problematic. These include:

- Catherine Winkworth, History and Life of the Reverend Doctor John Tauler with Twenty-Five of his Sermons, (London, Smith, Elder, and comp., 1857.) Available at http://www.ccel.org/ccel/winkworth/tauler
- Meditations on the life and passion of our Lord Jesus Christ, translated by APJ Cruikshank, (London: Thomas Richardson and Son, 1875) Available at http://www.ccel.org/ccel/tauler/meditations
- The following of Christ, translated by JR Morell, (London: T Fisher Unwin, 1886) Available at http://www.ccel.org/ccel/tauler/following
- The Inner Way, being Thirty-Six sermons for festivals by John Tauler, translated from the German, with introduction, by Arthur Wollaston Hutton, (London: Methuen & Co, 1901) Available at http://www.ccel.org/ccel/tauler/inner_way
