= Ground of the Soul =

Philosophical concept of the human soul from Middle Age Germany

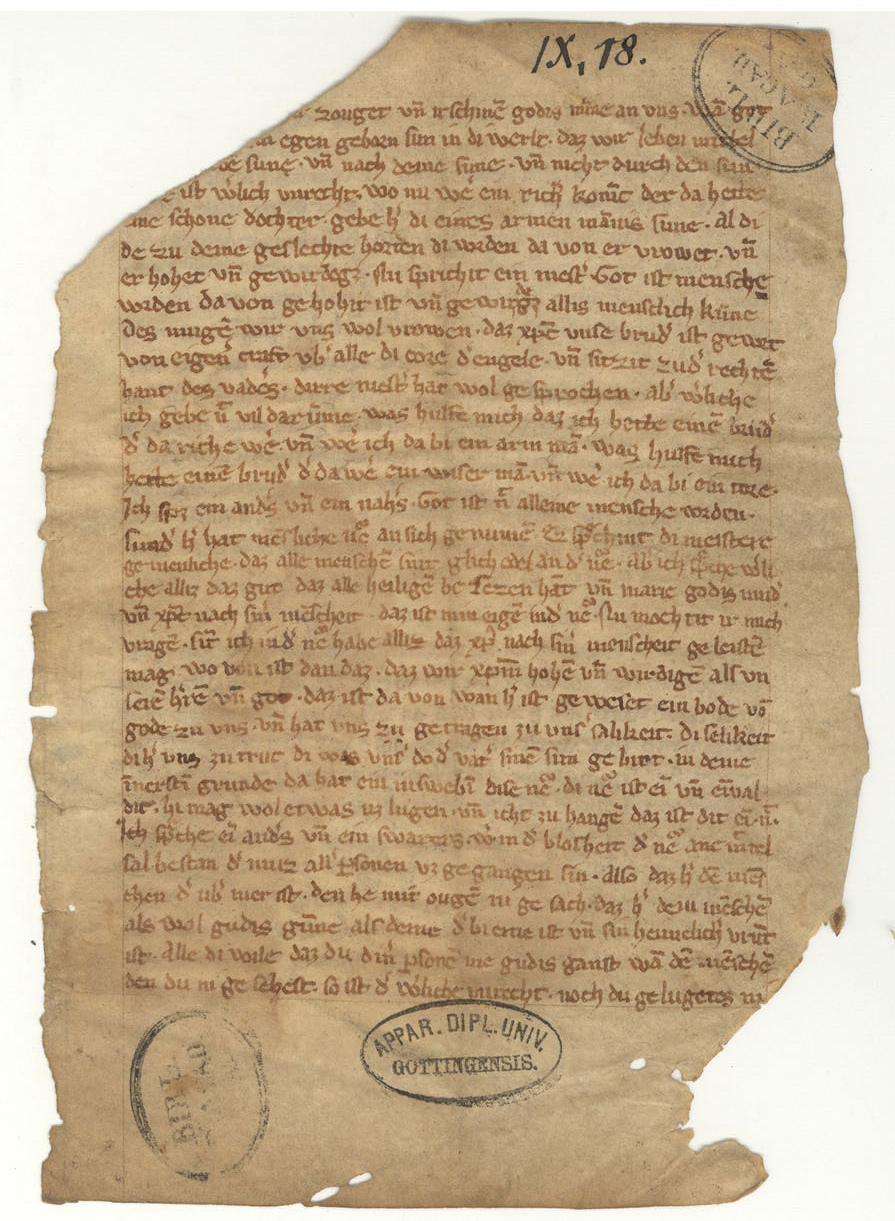
Fragment of Meister Eckhart's remarks on the Ground of the Soul (Sermon 5b) in a contemporary manuscript; Göttingen, University of Göttingen, Diplomatischer Apparat 10 E IX Nr. 18

The concept of the Ground of the Soul (German: Seelengrund) is a term of late medieval philosophy and spirituality that also appears in early modern spiritual literature. The concept was coined by Meister Eckhart (d. 1327/1328) and refers in a figurative sense to a "place" in the human soul where, according to spiritual teachings, God or the divine is present and a union of divinity with the soul can come about.

From antiquity, philosophers and theologians proposed theories that later became prerequisites and components of medieval teachings on the ground of the soul. The relevant medieval terminology can also be traced back to the concepts of these thinkers. Ancient Stoic and Neoplatonic philosophers were convinced that there was a guiding authority in the human soul that was analogous or of the same nature as the divine power that governed the universe. This established the possibility of a connection between mortal and error-prone human beings and the realm of the eternal, divine and absolute truth. Church writers took up philosophical concepts of the relationship between God and the soul and reshaped them in a Christian sense. The church father Augustine assumed that there was a realm in the depths of the human mind, the abditum mentis, in which a hidden a priori knowledge lay.

In the 12th century, concepts were developed according to which it was possible to contemplate God in the innermost realm of the soul. However, it was not until the late Middle Ages that a fully formed doctrine of the unity of the soul with the divinity at the ground of the soul emerged. Its originator was Meister Eckhart, who referred to St Augustine but primarily proclaimed his own unconventional doctrine of the divine in the human soul, which was offensive at the time. He postulated the existence of an innermost divine quality in the soul, which he designated as the "ground." The ground of the soul was not a creation of God but rather existed above and beyond all created things. It was a simple and limitless entity, devoid of any limiting determinations, and was identical to the "Godhead," the supra-personal aspect of the divine. All created entities are devoid of access to the divine, whereas the uncreated, supra-temporal ground of the soul provides an experience of God, as the godhead is always present there. Eckhart described this experience as the "birth of God" in the ground of the soul. The prerequisite for this was "seclusion": the soul had to detach itself with the utmost consistency from everything that distracted it from the divine simplicity and undifferentiatedness in its innermost being.

Eckhart's doctrine of the ground of the soul was condemned by the Church as heretical shortly after his death. However, its content was sometimes accepted in a modified form by late medieval seekers of God. In modern times, it has often been regarded as an expression of mystical irrationalism. However, more recent historians of philosophy emphasise that Eckhart in no way devalued reason; rather, he sought to convince with a philosophical argument and understood the ground of the soul as intellect.

In the early modern period, the concept of the ground of the soul or soul centre as a place to experience God survived in spiritual literature. It was adopted by Catholic authors as well as in Protestant pietism. The Enlightenment thinkers gave a different meaning to the expression "soul ground". They used it to describe the place of a "dark" realisation from which clarity emerges.

== Background ==
=== Antiquity ===
In antiquity, pagan and Christian authors developed doctrines of the soul that anticipated elements of Meister Eckhart's model. This involved a part of the soul that was regarded as divine or godlike or a divine entity within it.

==== Early approaches ====
The pre-Socratic philosopher Heraclitus (d. 460 BCE) posited that the boundaries of the soul could not be identified even through exhaustive travel of all paths, as its "logos" was very deep. Heraclitus regarded the soul as a representative part of the cosmic fire, the power that, according to his teachings, constituted all things and upon which the processes in the universe depended. He also described the soul as a spark of the substance of the stars.

In his work, Plato (d. 348/347 BCE) developed a model of the soul in which he ascribed to it a three-part, hierarchically organised structure. According to his theory, the lowest of the three parts of the soul is controlled by sensual desires and is of a passionate and reckless nature. In contrast, the highest part, the sphere of reason, is characterised by its opposite qualities. The middle part, the "courageous", is situated between reason and desire. Its function is to implement the decisions arrived at by reason. Since reason is the source of wisdom, it is naturally accorded the highest rank. According to the natural order, this part of the soul is entitled to rule over the other parts and the body, because only reason can judge what is beneficial for the whole and, thanks to this insight, is capable of correct guidance. The rational part of the soul is imbued with divine qualities. It is akin to the divine, eternal and immutable, and is similarly unborn and imperishable. Its endeavour is directed towards knowledge. The goal is not only knowledge that is gained through a discursive process; rather, it is primarily about a special experiential knowledge of the highest order, which everyone can only strive for themselves. Plato leaves open the extent to which such knowledge is attainable. The experiential knowledge he is referring to results from a kind of insight that has an intuitive and religious character and relates to a transcendent, divine realm. The object of such a vision is something that cannot be conceptualised in language. Such an experience is "unspeakable" (árrhēton), since it cannot be justified or communicated. It cannot be objectified and cannot be right or wrong; it is only either given or not given to the subject.

==== Stoic conception of the soul ====
The Stoics adopted conventional ideas, including the Platonic model, and modified them. They considered primordial fire to be the divine force that had unfolded and shaped the universe and that permeated, animated, moved and maintained it in being. They regarded the human being as a "microcosm", a "small world" in which the order of the "macrocosm" was reflected. The Stoics ascribed the role of the vitalising fire in the microcosm to the human soul, which they saw as an image of the deity who directed the cosmos. This led to the metaphor of the "soul spark", whereby the individual soul was conceived as a spark (apóspasma, torn-off part) of the divine primordial fire. At the core of the soul, the Stoics posited the existence of a guiding and coordinating authority, the hēgemonikón, which they typically situated in the heart. According to Stoic doctrine, this nucleus of the soul initiates and coordinates the various faculties, including imagination, thought, and will, following a uniform plan and directing them towards a unified goal: the preservation of the whole. The hegemonikon in the heart is the organising principle – the Logos – of man, just as the primordial fire, which has its seat in the sun, plays the role of the organising and structuring principle in the cosmos. The Logos in man corresponds to the world Logos; the nature of the macrocosm and the microcosm are one and the same.

The Greek Stoics' theory of the soul was adopted by the educated Romans, with the relevant terms being translated into Latin and incorporated into the terminology of Roman philosophical literature. Subsequently, the Greek and Latin expressions entered the vocabulary of the Church Fathers. The term hegemonikon was translated or paraphrased in various ways: principale cordis ("main instance of the heart") in Seneca, Jerome, Rufinus; principatus ("guiding principle", "basic power") in Cicero; regalis pars animi ("the royal part of the spirit") in Apuleius. The renowned Roman Stoic Seneca (d. 65) believed that the soul of the wise man, who could not be shaken by anything, possessed superhuman strength; a divine power had descended into him. The larger part of this soul remained where the smaller, descended part had come from. Following the Stoic tradition, Seneca used the image of the "spark" (scintilla) to visualise the divine origin of the spiritual principle in a person: Sparks of stars had fallen to earth, as it were, and remained in this place far from heaven. The Roman emperor Marcus Aurelius (d. 180), who also professed the Stoic doctrine and wrote in Greek, claimed that the hegemonikon was unconquerable "when it is content with itself, withdrawn into itself", because it does nothing that it does not want. He compared it to a castle; those who seek refuge there become invincible.

==== Neoplatonic concepts of the soul ====
The concept of a divine entity in the soul plays a central role in Plotinus (d. 270), the founder of Neoplatonism. According to his teachings, the immortal soul originates from an immaterial, purely spiritual world in which it is at home and enjoys bliss. However, it can descend into the physical world and temporarily connect with a body, which it then controls and uses as a tool. This is how earthly life comes about. However, the soul does not bind itself to the body in its entirety; rather, it only partially does so. "Something of it", its highest "part", always remains in the spiritual world. The term part is used here in a figurative sense, not in the sense of a spatial division or a real divisibility; the soul forms an indissoluble unity. The highest part of the soul is of divine quality, its bliss is never interrupted. The soul thus constantly shares in the entire fullness of the spiritual world, even if its embodied part becomes confused and suffers misfortune. However, this fact usually remains hidden from human consciousness because it is so overwhelmed by sensory impressions that it is unable to grasp what the uppermost part of the soul perceives. The soul experiences the manifold hardships and inadequacies of earthly existence, but the affects (emotions) that arise only affect it seemingly. These beliefs are based on illusions, as the soul is actually, in its highest and most important aspect, free from suffering. This aspect is permanently focused on the universal spirit (Nous), or the "Platonic ideas", which it contemplates with great delight. In contrast, the lower parts or layers of the soul are more or less oriented towards the material and sensually perceptible realm, and thus susceptible to numerous evils. However, if one leads a philosophical life, they can also orientate themselves towards the spiritual. It is therefore, ideally, that the parts will be in agreement; that their different functions will be harmonised and that the whole will be unified.

Plotinus's doctrine of an unassailable supreme part of the soul, removed from all earthly evils, anticipated central elements of the medieval concept of the ground of the soul. As his pupil Porphyry observed, he aimed to "elevate the divine in the individual souls to the divine in space". He held the soul in high regard, deriving its dignity from its divine aspect. He is renowned for his assertion that he did not engage in worship, stating that "those (the gods) must come to me, not I to them". With the assumption that there is something divine in the soul, he created the theoretical basis for his thesis that a union of the individual with the absolutely transcendent highest principle, the One, was possible and worth striving for. He even asserted that unity with the One, in which everything that exists has its origin, could be experienced during earthly life. The term hénōsis (union, becoming one) has become commonplace for such an experience of unity. According to Porphyry, Plotinus claimed henosis as a repeated act for himself. Porphyrios mentioned that his teacher had experienced unity about four times in the five years they spent together. Plotinus emphasised that the experience occurred suddenly.

Plotinus' description of henosis is in substantial agreement with the medieval depictions of the experience of being in the ground of the soul. This includes the de-differentiation associated with henosis, the transition into the formlessness of the undifferentiated, absolutely unified One; this corresponds to Meister Eckhart's demand to become "wayless", just as God is "without way/manner" (without determination). The concept of "seclusion", which is central to Eckhart's teaching, can also be discerned in Plotinus's writings. For instance, Plotinus states that the "life of the gods and divine, blessed men" is a "departure" (apallagḗ) from everything earthly ("from everything else that is here"), a "flight of the One to the One" or "flight of the lonely to the lonely". According to Plotinus, one enters into seclusion in "calm divine fulfilment", a state of motionlessness in which nothing distracts. He compared this to entering a sanctuary (ádyton), the innermost chamber of a temple. This "departure" is a highly individualised self-identification with the source, the One, to whom, according to Neoplatonic philosophy, everything that exists owes its existence. For Plotinus, as in late medieval spirituality, the prerequisite for this is a radical separation of consciousness from everything that is not the source. Identification with the pure unity that excludes nothing requires that one does not hold on to anything that belongs to the world of the particular, of duality and multiplicity. However, a direct influence of Plotinus' writings on medieval authors can be ruled out, as his works were unknown in Western and Central Europe at the time.

The thesis that the highest part of the soul always remains in the spiritual world was firmly rejected by Iamblichus (d. 320/325) and the late antique Neoplatonists who followed him. They believed that the soul descends completely when it connects with a body. One of Iamblichos' arguments was that the assumption of a permanent communion of a part of the soul with the divine realm was inconsistent because such a connection could not be unconscious. Rather, if such a communion existed, all people would have to be happy all the time. Proclus (d. 485), one of the most influential neo-Platonists of late antiquity, also attacked Plotinus' position. He considered the thesis that "something of our soul remains above" to be contradictory. On the other hand, he argued that that which, according to such a model, always remains at the top could never connect with that which sinks downwards, as there must be a gulf of principle between them. Furthermore, one should not assume that the nature of souls and that of the spiritual world and the gods are the same. Rather, the soul is inherently subordinate to the hierarchy of entities, as it is not a component of the spiritual world but rather a product of it. For the Neoplatonists of late antiquity, Plotinus' optimistic assessment of the relationship between the incarnate soul (living in the physical world) and higher levels seemed unrealistic and presumptuous. Nevertheless, they shared his conviction that the spiritual world was not closed to the incarnate soul and that it was absolutely desirable to connect with it. Proklos also believed that it was possible to ascend to the transcendent One. According to his teachings, the possibility of meeting the One is based on the fact that there is "the One in us", and "the One in the soul", which the Demiurge, the creator of the world, has implanted there. This individual One also referred to as the "flower of the soul", is "the most divine of what is in us", the most "unified" and "united" in people, the principle that creates their unity and unites the diversity within them. It is not the same as the transcendent One, but it is analogous; it is its "image" or "seed". Due to this similarity structure, the transcendent One is recognisable and attainable. This necessitates the recognition of the "One in us". Proklos advocated the awakening of the "One in us" and the ignition of this entity in fervour, thereby facilitating the connection of the soul with the transcendent One. This connection can be likened to the anchoring of the soul in this entity. This upward movement of the soul necessitates a "divinising impetus".

==== Reception in ancient Christianity ====
The ecclesiastical writer Origen, a contemporary of Plotinus, engaged with the reflections of the pagan philosophers on the relationship between the soul and divinity. He reshaped traditional ideas in a Christian sense by presenting the innermost realm of the human spirit as the place of God's presence in human beings and the meeting point between the human and the divine. This is where there is direct contact with the divine in the form of cognition, which is fundamentally different from the normal cognition of external objects. Origen thus introduced a distinction between normal, rational cognition employing the faculty of thought and knowledge of God based on a special ability of the soul that is only intended for this purpose. In doing so, he departed from the Platonic tradition, which did not distinguish between "natural" and "supernatural" cognition. Rather, all acts of cognition were attributed to the same principle, which unfolded on different levels. The Platonists assumed a continuity running through all forms of knowledge. Origen contrasted this view with the separation between rational and irrational or supra-rational cognition, which had far-reaching consequences in the history of ideas.

The influential Church Father Augustine (d. 430) espoused the Platonic view, which did not distinguish between fundamentally different types of knowledge of the human mind. In his work De trinitate, Augustine coined the term abditum mentis, which translates as "hiding place of the mind" or "the hidden part of the mind". He employed this term to describe an area within the depths of the human mind to which he ascribed a priori knowledge, which he regarded as the foundation of thought and cognition. According to his theory, this knowledge is always present within this area, but hidden and therefore unconscious; however, it can be brought to consciousness through thought. The "hidden depth of our memory" is the place where people encounter content that does not originate from their stored memories, but which they think for the first time. This is the site of the "innermost word," which is not reducible to any language. In the act of thinking, an insight emerges that is derived from an insight that was already present, though previously obscured.

Augustine's reflections on the abditum mentis, which were influenced by Neoplatonic thought, were taken up in the Middle Ages and utilised for the discourse on the ground of the soul. However, it is unclear whether Augustine understood this as a specific instance and a guiding principle of the entire life of the soul, as medieval authors believed.

=== High Middle Ages ===
In the 12th century, the question of the conditions and nature of the relationship between God and the soul gained new relevance. The prevailing concepts of the soul at the time were significantly influenced by the Augustinian tradition. Among the spiritually orientated writers, the most influential were the "Victorians", theologians of the canon monastery of Saint-Victor in Paris, as well as monks of the Cistercian order. In these circles, the possibility of knowing God was attributed to a "faculty of the soul" (potentia animae), which served this specific purpose. This meant a special power (vis) or ability present in the human soul. The terminology originally introduced by Aristotle and later translated into Latin was used, in which the individual activities of the soul such as perception, thinking and movement were assigned to specific dispositions, the "faculties". These faculties were organised hierarchically according to the rank of their objects. The highest faculty of the soul, activated during the experience of God, was referred to as the "intellect" (intellectus) and was distinguished from the ratio, the faculty responsible for conceptual thinking. Some authors described it metaphorically as an organ of the soul. Hugh of Saint Victor, for example, taught that the soul had three "eyes". The first faculty, the eye of the flesh, enables the soul to perceive the physical world. The second faculty, the eye of the ratio, allows the soul to observe itself and its interior. The third faculty, the eye of contemplation, enables the soul to perceive God and the divine within itself (intra se). However, this faculty is extinguished as a result of original sin and the soul is now unable to perceive God in an unmediated manner. Consequently, humanity is no longer capable of perceiving God directly; rather, it must rely on faith. It is only in the promised future bliss that the ability to perceive God directly will be restored.

Hugo's concept of the three eyes of the soul had a considerable impact in medieval spiritual literature. Additionally, there was the idea of a specific area or place in the soul or in the human spirit (mens) where the realisation of God occurred. This area, which was regarded as the most important, could only be the core of the soul, its innermost being, and the highest level within it. It was regarded as the actual seat of man's likeness to God. In this sense, Richard of Saint Victor, taking up an idea of Augustine, stated that in the human spirit "without doubt the highest is at the same time the innermost and the innermost at the same time the highest". Richard considered it possible to ascend to the "highest and innermost womb of the spirit", to grasp and hold it and to contemplate the invisible divine there. However, he noted that this perception could not be achieved through voluntary means and that it was only granted to a select few. It is realised through the spiritual sense (sensus intellectualis), which is distinct from the rational sense (sensus rationalis). With the sense of reason, man perceives his own invisible realm. The divine realm in the human mind is separated by a thick curtain of oblivion. Those who venture there forget not only everything external but also everything that is within themselves. Even when returning to the familiar world, the curtain causes forgetting, but not complete forgetting. Consequently, one can remember the experience afterwards, but only in an inadequate way, no longer in the original truth and clarity.

In the first half of the 13th century, the Dutch beguine Hadewijch, who probably lived near Antwerp, described the relationship between the soul and God in a way that anticipated elements of late medieval doctrines of the soul in terms of content and terminology. Hadewijch already uses the terms "ground" (Middle Dutch gront), "abyss" (afgront) and "bottomlessness" (grondeloesheit). She employed such expressions to describe the mutual interpenetration of God and the human soul united with him. The concept of "groundlessness" bears resemblance to Meister Eckhart's description of the deity as "groundless ground", although there is no evidence that he was familiar with the beguine's writings. Hadewijch did not develop a theological or philosophical system; rather, she drew upon her own ecstatic experiences, attempting to convey them in words. In her 18th letter, she described the soul as "bottomlessness in which God is self-sufficient". God's self-sufficiency finds its fullest enjoyment in it and it in turn in him. God is a way in which the soul comes out into its freedom, namely into the ground of God, which cannot be touched without the depth of the soul. In her writings, Hadewijch depicted the unity of God with the soul in a manner that suggests a profound merging of the two entities (enecheit), to the extent that they become indistinguishable, at least on one level.

== Late medieval concepts of the soul ==
The term "Seelengrund" is believed to have originated from the language used in Middle High German courtly poetry. Here, the term "Herzensgrund" was employed to describe profound, intimate emotions. This metaphor of the ground to describe something profound was subsequently transferred to the realm of spiritual literature. Following the mid-13th century, Mechthild of Magdeburg posited that the heart of Mary, the Mother of God, possessed "the deepest ground of divine knowledge before all people".

Theological and philosophical concepts of the ground of the soul only emerged in the Late Middle Ages. Their authors and principal representatives were all German members of the Dominican Order (Order of Preachers) and disseminated their teachings on the ground of the soul in German. In England, the term "ground" (Middle English: grounde) was used in late medieval spiritual literature for the nature or substance of man or the soul; it is particularly common in Julian of Norwich. Although there are similarities between the English and German uses of the term, the core elements of the German doctrines were either absent in England or only present in a rudimentary form.

=== Meister Eckhart ===
==== Linking up with tradition ====
The term "ground of the soul" was introduced into medieval spiritual discourse by Meister Eckhart (d. 1327/1328). In doing so, he referred to Augustine's remarks on the "hiddenness of the spirit", which he interpreted in terms of his doctrine of the soul. He frequently quoted the words "in abdito mentis" from Augustine's De trinitate. He translated them into Middle High German with "in dem verborgensten der sêle" and similar phrases. He equated the "hiddenness of the spirit" discussed in De trinitate with what he called the ground of the soul. However, in doing so, he gave the ancient expression a new meaning, as his thinking took him in a direction that led him far away from Augustine's concept. The ancient church father had employed the term "hiding place" to signify the location of unconscious ideas (notitiae), which pertain to specific contents of thought and emerge into the field of consciousness (conspectus mentis) during the act of thinking. Consequently, he was preoccupied with concepts, with latent knowledge related to individual things, which he situated in the abditum mentis. In contrast, Eckhart perceived the "ground of the soul" as a domain from which all forms of imagination and conceptual thought are precluded in principle. Consequently, his engagement with Augustine's thought and formulation was more formal than substantial.

==== The distinction between God and Godhead ====
Eckhart's understanding of the relationship between the soul and the divine is fundamentally based on his distinction between "God" (in the narrower sense) and "Godhead". In his teaching, these two terms denote two separate levels of the reality of the divine or God in the broader sense. According to him, God (in the narrower sense) and deity are as far apart as heaven and earth. At the lower level is God in the narrower sense, that is, God in his capacity as Creator, who faces his creatures as such. In this context, "God" is the counter-concept to everything created; God stands in a relationship of cause and effect to everything that exists apart from him. The higher level, "above God", is the place of the divine as "Godhead" or as a "one-fold One", which has no relationship whatsoever to anything outside itself. Eckhart's Godhead causes nothing; it is not an entity that creates and thus forms a contrast to the created. Given that it is absolute unity, it is also not the triune God in the sense of the doctrine of the Trinity, who appears in three persons, and not the Father, who begets the Son Jesus Christ. Rather, it is the super-personal, absolutely unified aspect of the divine reality as a whole. God, on the other hand, is personal; he maintains an I-Thou relationship with his creatures and also develops an inner-trinitarian life and relationship within himself. The Godhead does not produce anything; it does not procreate or generate. "God works, the Godhead does not work. (...) God and deity are distinguished by working and non-working."

Nevertheless, the distinction between "God" and "Godhead" is not consistently made throughout Eckhart's use of language. On occasion, he employs the term "God" in a more restricted sense, solely to designate the Creator. At other times, he uses it in a broader sense, encompassing the supra-personal "Godhead" or making specific reference to it. The intended meaning in each case is clear from the context. The notion of two distinct types of God, or of God as differentiated within himself, appears to be present even in instances where it is not explicitly articulated in terms of terminology.

It is not possible to make any definitive statements about Eckhart's concept of Godhead, as it is beyond any differentiation. It is "wayless", i.e. without characteristics by which it could be defined; it is a "groundless ground" and a "silent desert", a "monotonous silence". In a similar manner to the Neoplatonic One, the Godhead cannot be defined by any characteristics, as this would also result in limitations and incompatibility with its undifferentiated character. Consequently, all characteristics attributed to God, such as goodness, power or wisdom, must be denied. Even the concept of being is excluded, as being is also a determination and therefore incompatible with the undetermined. Consequently, the assertion that the Godhead "is" is erroneous; rather, it is a matter of "a supersubstantial being and a supersubstantial non-being". By persistently rejecting all positive statements about the Godhead, Eckhart adhered to the tenets of "negative theology", particularly those espoused by the ancient thinker Pseudo-Dionysius the Areopagite.

The level at which God exists as a person with personal attributes is separate from and subordinate to that of the Godhead. Since it is impossible to bring a purpose into that which is without purpose, God, like everything else that is purposeful, has no access to the impersonal aspect of the divine, unless he were to divest himself of his attributes and leave aside everything that constitutes his particularity. Eckhart observed: "This is easy to see, for this certain One is without manner and particularity. And therefore, if God is ever to look into it, it must cost him all his divine names and his peculiarity; he must leave all that outside if he is ever to look into it."

==== The soul and its ground ====
Eckhart defined the divine core area of the soul, its hidden "innermost being", which according to his teachings is timeless and spaceless and in which complete peace reigns, as the ground of the soul. He also used a number of other terms for this, including the "spark", "light" or "Bürglein", the "highest", "purest" or "head" of the soul. Nevertheless, Eckhart also emphasised that the ground of the soul is actually nameless, in a manner analogous to the Godhead. According to Eckhart's teachings, the outer realms in which the soul's activities take place are to be distinguished from this unchanging core area, which is removed from any kind of change and far removed from any activity. This is where the soul influences its surroundings and is in turn influenced by its environment. This is where its will and desires are expressed in words and deeds, while at the same time it stores what it experiences as external influences in its memory. The soul fulfils its tasks with its various faculties, which are described in the relevant writings of Aristotle that were authoritative in the late Middle Ages. The soul must utilise its faculties to fulfil the requirements of its connection with the body and to ensure the survival of the human being. In doing so, it comes into contact with created and transient things. This means constant change, constant becoming and passing away. The ground of the soul is separated from this sphere; the manifold impressions that flow in from the world of sensory perception do not reach it.

As a supra-spatial and supra-temporal entity that exerts no influence and is not influenced by external factors, the ground of the soul aligns with Eckhart's concept of Godhead. Additionally, it shares a similar quality: it is completely undifferentiated. In contrast to the outer realms of the soul, it lacks distinguishable, co-existing contents or functions. At the ground of the soul, the soul has no ideas whatsoever, neither of itself nor anything created or of God. It has "neither working nor understanding" there. All distinctions are suspended. In a manner analogous to the absolute undifferentiated Godhead, which is detached from all that exists, the undifferentiated ground in the soul differs from the totality of its other areas, where inner-soul interactions take place and impressions are received from outside.

Eckhart's concept of the ground of the soul as a timeless, spaceless and featureless entity imbued it with a divine quality that was absent from created things. This resulted in a significant but problematic consequence for medieval theologians: the core area of the soul is not only imperishable but also uncreated. In addition to being immortal, as was commonly assumed in the Middle Ages, the soul existed in a state of eternity before the creation of the world. In a sermon, Eckhart stated, "I have sometimes spoken of a light that is in the soul, which is uncreated and uncreatable." Consequently, the ground of the soul is not a creation of God in time out of nothing and therefore subordinate to him; rather, it is eternal and unified like the Godhead itself. Eckhart explicitly referred to a "part" of the soul, the "Bürglein", which he described as "God-like" concerning this part and nothing else. He vouched for the truth of this statement, for which he pledged his soul. According to his understanding, the divine in the soul is fundamentally different in nature from everything in it that is created and concerns its interaction with the outside world. Given that the ground of the soul has no spatial extension, it is evident that expressions such as "part" or "innermost" are not to be understood in a spatial context and that the terms must not be "reified" in the interpretation. Eckhart emphasised that the ground of the soul has nothing in common with any "things". In contrast to Augustine's abditum mentis, Eckhart's timeless and placeless ground of the soul is not a "thing". It does not count as an object, cannot be categorised according to Aristotle's system of categories and is therefore, like divinity, removed from discursive thinking. Eckhart later distanced himself from the idea that the soul is composed of a created and an uncreated part. This was a false, malicious interpretation of his teaching. He did not intend to suggest that the uncreated part of the soul constituted a part of the soul itself.

For Eckhart, a monotheistic medieval theologian, there could only be one deity. From a philosophical perspective, it was also impossible to place anything else alongside the absolutely transcendent One. Within the framework of his concept of a strictly unified Godhead, the "God-like" ground of the soul could therefore not be understood as an independent being; it had to be equated with the Godhead. Consequently, divinity is present in the human soul constantly and directly. This is the ground of the soul as described by Eckhart. A new foundation and quality of humanity's relationship with the divine was established. Humankind, as a creature, cannot reach God, its Creator. According to Eckhart's conviction, the gulf between the eternal God and the transient created being is so deep that nothing created can find access to God. However, since there is an uncreated realm in the soul that differs in nothing from the Godhead, the abyss between the Creator and his work does not exist there and only there. The perfect and irrevocable unity of the Godhead with itself exists in the ground of the soul. The following applies to the "inner world", the "innermost part of the spirit": "Here God's ground is my ground and my ground is God's ground." It is erroneous to conceive of God as an external entity, separate from oneself. Rather, God is to be understood as "my own" and as that which is within oneself. God is "at the bottom of the soul with all his divinity". The only remaining task for humanity is to recognise this fact and to derive the appropriate conclusions from it.

Eckhart derived far-reaching conclusions regarding the unique rank of the human soul from the unity of the soul's ground with the Godhead. He emphasised its high nobility and claimed that it stood above all creatures and even above the angels, that it was nobler than the heavens and far above them. The creatures were only traces of God and unworthy of him, that he himself worked in them, but the ground of the soul was equal to him. In the "first touch", in which God touches and continues to touch the uncreated and uncreatured soul, it is "just as noble as God himself according to the touch of God". According to Eckhart's teaching, another consequence of the uncreated nature of the soul's foundation is human freedom. Everything created is unfree. Only those people are free who orientate themselves by the ground of the soul and are thus "seized" by divine justice. Such an individual is no longer a servant; they do not serve either God or creatures, as this would be incompatible with their freedom, which they do not possess but "are". The hierarchical relationship that exists between God and creatures is negated in this context.

==== The breakthrough to the divinity at the ground of the soul ====
Eckhart posits that the goal should not be to stop at the concept of God, but rather to "break through" to the Godhead. This entails transcending the level of the personal, triune God to advance to the "one-fold" Godhead. This breakthrough can be described as a process of "realisation," although it is not necessarily perceived in the usual sense. The deity cannot be an object of cognition, neither for itself nor for others, because where a recognising subject is separated from a recognised object, there is no absolute unity, and therefore the realm of the deity remains closed. Moreover, the soul can only recognise something if it has an image of it, but all images come from outside, i.e. not from the Godhead. Consequently, the realisation of the undifferentiated deity is not possible in the normal sense; it is only possible in the realm of determinations and images. As an object that is sought by a subject, the deity is in principle unattainable, even though its existence as such is recognisable. Eckhart comments: "The hidden darkness of the invisible light of the eternal Godhead is unrecognisable and will never be recognised." Although Eckhart speaks of recognising God, as was customary in the language of the time, when it comes to the deity, we can only speak of "recognising" in a non-essential sense, because there is no recogniser who stands in front of a recognised being.

Eckhart assigns a central role to the "breakthrough" in his teaching. He refers to this as the birth of God in the soul, a concept that draws upon a topos from the time of the Church Fathers. The idea is that the soul realises the divinity of its own nature and thus discovers the Godhead in its innermost being. In this process, the individual human being does not become something they were not before; rather, they realise their true nature, which is already present within them. The birth of God begins in the soul of the individual human being and extends to encompass the entirety of the soul. For Eckhart, this is the meaning and purpose of creation. Only through the birth of God in the soul does the birth of Christ through Mary take on meaning for humankind. Furthermore, the historical birth of Christ is contingent upon the birth of God in Mary's soul. The birth of God in the soul is not a punctual event that concludes, but rather a continuous process whose temporality is the "present now" in which the soul "stands". The emphasis on the processual nature of the event is a distinctive feature of Eckhart's concept. He understands the birth of God as the soul's return to the Godhead – its own primordial ground and origin. Human beings, who are closest to God, can become through divine grace what God is by nature; they are then in the greatest correspondence with the "image that he was in God, in which there was no difference between him and God before God created the creatures".

When the soul is seized by the divine influence from its very foundation, its receptivity and passivity are revealed; it receives God. Eckhart therefore claims that human bliss does not lie in the working but in the "suffering" of God (an dem daz wir got lîden). He explains: "As omnipotent as God is in working, the soul is just as abysmal in undergoing; and that is why it is moulded with God and in God."

The birth of God is brought about by God, who works in the soul, but man has to create the conditions for this. According to Eckhart's conviction, divine action is never arbitrary, but always lawful: it is a necessary consequence of the interplay between God's unchanging nature and the respective circumstances. Therefore, the birth of God in the soul happens inevitably when the conditions for it are fulfilled. It is then a natural necessity. God, who makes it possible, could not act in any other way without giving himself up. This is illustrated by the fact that "He must do it, whether he likes it or is sorry."; "God's nature, his being and his divinity depend on the fact that he must work in the soul." Eckhart compares God's imperative to illustrate its involuntariness with the later so-called physical "horror vacui", the abhorrence of emptiness, which was attributed to nature. It was assumed that nature would not tolerate an empty space, and would therefore prevent the creation of a vacuum in any given area. Eckhart's description of the self-emptying of man, who realises seclusion, suggests that this process "forces" God to seek out the secluded soul and pour himself into it, to prevent the formation of a "vacuum" within it.

Although the breakthrough to the Godhead cancels out all opposites and differences and thus transcends discursive thinking, which operates with determinations, it is not an irrational process in Eckhart's view. Reason is not left behind. Rather, it constantly accompanies man, following Eckhart's demand: "And man should use his reason attentively in all his works and in all things, and in everything have a rational awareness of himself and his inwardness." Concerning the birth of God, Eckhart asserts that "knowledge and reason unite the soul with God." He further posits that reason penetrates the pure being, while knowledge runs ahead and breaks through. Eckhart ascribes a central role to reason in the breakthrough and an unrivalled dignity to it because he views God as pure intellect. He considers existence to be God's "forecourt" and reason to be his temple: "Nowhere does God dwell more truly than in his temple, in reason." Eckhart employs two distinct concepts of intellect. In some instances, it is understood as one of the faculties of the soul, signifying the capacity for discursive cognition that exists outside the ground of the soul. In other contexts, it is conceived as the intellect that is in the ground of the soul and is ultimately identical to it. This latter concept is the reason that gives man non-discursive, direct access to the divine. This is the sole possible avenue of access: "The soul has no capacity through which God could speak except reason."

Eckhart provides a detailed account of the conditions that must be fulfilled for the birth of God to be possible. Since it is a matter of entering into unity, everything that stands in the way of unity must be removed. Obstacles are not only sins and vices in the conventional sense, but also everything ungodly and therefore transient. This includes, in particular, the "images" of sensual objects that one has taken in because they bind and hinder the person. Eckhart forcefully refutes the argument put forth by Aristotelians and Thomists, who maintain that only images are inherently present in the soul and that it is its nature to perceive through the senses and in images. Consequently, they argue, the removal of all images is contrary to nature. Eckhart counters this by asserting that those who hold this view have not fully grasped the nobility of the soul. He explains that nothing hinders the soul from recognizing God as much as time and space. Time and space are "pieces", but God is one and can only be recognised above them. Therefore, the realisation of God is impossible as long as the soul is aware of time or space.

Eckhart provides a comprehensive account of the preparatory purification of the soul. A focus on the divine is incompatible with a will and desire that is oriented towards the world. Consequently, the initial objective is to liberate oneself from all such aspirations, to consistently disengage oneself inwardly from the terrestrial realm without neglecting the fulfilment of worldly responsibilities. Eckhart refers to the consequence of such detachment from the world as "seclusion". The ground of the soul is inherently secluded. Nevertheless, it is crucial to entirely separate the various aspects of the soul from "all things" for the individual to become void and for God to enter this void. Subsequently, the entirety of the soul may be filled by God. It is recommended that individuals should endeavour to grasp God in all things and accustom their minds to having God present at all times. Such an attitude ultimately leads to the complete divinisation of the individual. "I am transformed into him in such a way that he works me as his being, and indeed as one, not as the same; with the living God, it is true that there is no difference whatsoever." Eckhart also asserts that this is about a genuine unity of the human being and God, as evidenced by the following words: Some individuals with a simplistic worldview believe that they should perceive God as if he were physically present in the immediate vicinity. This is not the case. "God and I are one." This demand for unity is so radical that the idea that God should find a place to work in man must also be rejected. From Eckhart's perspective, the notion of a location for activity is predicated on the concept of a specific spiritual substance and a relationship between two entities, which is incompatible with seclusion. Rather, what is required is that the human being "stands so unattached to God and all his works" that God, if he wants to work in the soul, finds no place there, and thus himself be the place where to act.

A fundamental tenet of the doctrine of the birth of God in the ground of the soul is the assertion that this process occurs directly, without any intermediary. "This must happen without means", Eckhart states; "Any kind of mediation is alien to God." Nevertheless, according to Eckhart's interpretation, it is possible to conceptualise a form of mediation in the ground of the soul if one considers silence, the absence of images, as the mediating factor that enables the soul to find rest in God.

Eckhart provides a detailed account of the emotional aspects of turning to God in the soul. He underscores the "great joy" and "immeasurable bliss" associated with this. For those who experience this, all human suffering appears to be comparatively insignificant. The soul is imbued with a "power" that radiates the divine essence of God, who is "glowing and burning without ceasing with all his richness, with all his sweetness and with all his delight". Nevertheless, Eckhart differentiates between this experience of delight and the phenomenon of breakthrough. He postulates that this power, like all other powers, is incapable of accessing the divine essence at the ground of the soul, due to its intrinsic simplicity, which precludes the possibility of external influence.

==== The master of life anchored in the ground of the soul ====
Eckhart's initial objective was to convey to his listeners or readers a discursively attainable insight into the truth of his philosophical and theological teachings. Nevertheless, he considered such an understanding to be of little consequence in terms of facilitating the birth of God within people. Rather, he considered the practice of life to be the determining factor in achieving seclusion. The realization was of paramount importance. To illustrate this, he employed a pun to highlight the distinction between a "master of reading" and a "master of life". In the Dominican order to which Eckhart belonged, a "master reader" was a monk who had undergone scientific training and was responsible for training his fellow monks in the order's education system. The lector, or reading master, delivered lectures and instructed his students in traditional doctrinal material. It seems probable that Eckhart fulfilled this role himself in Cologne. He contrasted this theoretical approach to knowledge with the work of a "master of life", who applied the theoretical principles they had learned in their own lives and could therefore serve as a role model. A saying attributed to Eckhart is that one master of life is more necessary than a thousand masters of reading. In this instance, he employed a rhetorical device to highlight the distinction between intellectual comprehension and internalisation. While the former can be discarded or forgotten, the latter remains constant. In light of this, he exhorted: "Man should not have an imagined God and be satisfied with that; for when the thought passes away, the God also passes away. Rather, one should have an essential God who is far above the thoughts of man and all creatures."

Eckhart posits that the life of an individual who orientates himself towards the ground of the soul is fundamentally transformed, acquiring meaning and value that it would otherwise never have. The birth of God imbues all the actions of such a person with extraordinary significance. As a consequence, even the most mundane actions of such an individual are imbued with a significance that is far beyond the reach of those who have not achieved the same level of spiritual understanding. If an individual who has attained a grasp of the divine nature of God steps on a stone, this is a more divine act than if one receives the Eucharist without such an attitude. Anyone who has ever "peered" into the depths of their soul for just a moment, may consider a thousand marks of gold as of equal value as a false Heller. One who bestows a greater benefit upon themselves or their intimate friend than upon a person who lives beyond the sea and whom they have never seen, has never "peered for a moment into this simple ground".

This prompts the question of the distinction between an exemplary individual, a virtuous person who has mastered the art of life, and a sinner who is indifferent to the existence of God. Given that the birth of God occurs in the undetermined, and that the Godhead cannot even be described as "good" due to its indetermination, the ground of the soul is beyond all moral judgments. Eckhart's teachings indicate that the ground of the soul of the virtuous individual is not distinct from that of the sinner. The ground in a person's soul is unchanging by nature and is not contingent upon their actions. The moral value of an individual's actions plays no role in the divine workings of the soul. Even for those who are in hell, the nobility of nature remains unchanging. The distinction between the two groups is that in the case of good people, the divine light emanates from the ground of the soul and radiates into the "outer" areas of the soul, where the soul's faculties are active. In contrast, in the case of bad people, this process does not occur. Those who engage in morally reprehensible actions are unable to receive the divine light. Although Eckhart espoused the doctrine that the Godhead is devoid of action and therefore lacks the capacity for love, he nevertheless posited a relationship between the Godhead and the realm of love and ethical distinctions. This relationship is characterised by the emanation of love from the Godhead.

As a preacher, Eckhart placed great emphasis on the importance of conveying to his audience that the status of the righteous or master of life was not a privilege of a particularly qualified elite, but was attainable for everyone. The joy associated with complete seclusion was not a distant goal, but rather a tangible possibility. It is unlikely that any of the listeners were so coarse or so limited in their understanding or so removed from the concept of seclusion that they could not find this joy "as it truly is" within themselves "even before you come out of this church today, even before I finish my sermon".

==== Condemnation of the doctrine ====
In the final years of his life, Eckhart was denounced and accused of heresy, which can be defined as a deviation from orthodoxy. The inquisition process initiated against him in Cologne was reopened at the papal court in Avignon and brought to a conclusion after his death. Pope John XXII condemned certain of Eckhart's statements as heretical and prohibited the dissemination of works containing them. In the bull In agro dominico of 27 March 1329, seventeen theses originating from Eckhart or attributed to him were classified as erroneous or heretical, while eleven others were designated as suspect. The concept of the ground of the soul, with its various aspects and consequences, constituted a central element in the attacks on his teachings.

The accusers and the papal court regarded the assertion that the human soul is partly uncreated as particularly offensive. The prosecution interpreted this as an assertion that the soul was composed of both created and uncreated elements, with the uncreated divine element being regarded as one of its faculties. Such an interpretation led to the conclusion that the doctrine of the presence of divinity in the soul constituted a degradation of God. This point was repeatedly highlighted in the papal list of errors. The unrestricted divinisation of the spiritual birth of God was deemed blasphemous, as it appeared to lead to the identification of a person with God. Furthermore, critics perceived this interpretation as a threat to the unique status of Christ as the only God-man. The Pope condemned the theses in question, which had been interpreted in this way. Eckhart, who did not survive to see the condemnation, defended himself against the attacks and accused his opponents of ignorance and malicious misinterpretation of his teachings.

The Franciscan William of Ockham (d. 1347), a vehement opponent of the Pope, accused John XXII of failing to condemn Eckhart's absurd and fantastical theses as heresies. It would appear that Ockham was unaware of the bull of condemnation. In particular, he considered assumptions related to the concept of the uncreated ground of the soul and the absolute undifferentiated nature of the Godhead to be absurd. Ockham cited Eckhart's assertions that there is no distinction (distinctio) in the realm of the divine (in divinis) and that any righteous person is transformed into the divine essence (essentia), just as the bread is transformed into the body of Christ at the Eucharist.

=== Johannes Tauler ===
The Dominican Johannes Tauler (d. 1361) was one of the most renowned spiritual teachers of the late Middle Ages in the German-speaking world. He held Eckhart's teachings in high regard and drew considerable inspiration from them. One of the concepts he drew on was the ground of the soul, which he, like Eckhart, equated with the Augustinian "hiding place of the spirit". He translated the Latin expression abditum mentis into Middle High German as verborgen appetgrunde ("hidden abyss"). He preferred to characterise the innermost part of the soul as an abyss. In this context, he referred to the biblical passage Ps 42:8 EU, where the Vulgate version of the Latin Bible speaks of an abyss (abyssus) that "calls" (invocat) an abyss. Tauler interpreted this to signify the mutual attraction between the divine abyss and the abyss of the human soul. He frequently referenced the ground of the soul in his sermons. He designated it as the most pure, most intimate, and noblest, "the innermost ground where alone there is unity." It can be posited that God could "enter" this state of being if the "mind" – the human spirit – was carried upwards. This ground is distinct from earthly realities; it is situated at a high level above the realm of spiritual powers or faculties that give life and movement to the body. It is so noble that it cannot be adequately described by any term, including the term "floor," which is inadequate.

Nevertheless, Tauler employed a variety of terms to describe the ground of the soul, including "spark" and "the supreme human being," in addition to the primary term "ground." In his anthropology, Tauler posits that human beings are composed of three distinct personas: the "animal" person, who lives by the senses; the rational person; and the "supreme, inner" person, who is "God-shaped, God-formed." Upon entering into itself, or its ground, the soul becomes divine and lives a divine life.

In a sermon, Tauler asserted that God operates within the "innermost, most hidden, deepest foundation of the soul." He posited that God could not be separated from this innermost core of the soul, like he could not be separated from himself. In consequence of divine grace, the ground of the soul is endowed with all that God possesses by nature. Tauler referred to the "pagan master" Proclus, whom he quoted at length. Proclus had already identified that it was impossible to reach the essence of the matter by focusing on images and diversity, rather than on the One. It is regrettable that a pagan had discerned this truth and grasped it, whereas Christians were distant from it. The truth as formulated by Proclus was identical to that proclaimed in the Gospel, as evidenced by the following words: The kingdom of God is within you (Luke 17:21 EU). This implies that the kingdom of God is located within the ground, above all the effects of the powers of the soul. Tauler emphasised that there is a completely pure, undisguised and reliable recognition and awareness of the "inner ground" where the kingdom of God is. However, this could not be achieved through the use of natural reason; rather, it required the intervention of special grace. Tauler's teaching posits that the requisite grace is not bestowed upon the individual who has sufficiently qualified for it by an arbitrary decision of God; rather, it must be granted to him as soon as he fulfils all the requirements. Consequently, God must become the active principle in man as a consequence of his own necessity of being. The necessity of self-communication is an immanent aspect of God's nature.

Like Eckhart, Tauler espoused the view that the unification of the soul at its ground required the elimination of all human idiosyncrasies, as these impeded the process of unification with God. A person must first withdraw into themselves, overcome diversity and make their mind simple, achieve spiritual unity through concentration and collection so that union with the simple God becomes possible. In a sermon, Tauler elucidated that the human spirit then descends into the divine abyss and becomes lost within it, such that it is unaware of its own existence; it loses its own knowledge and activity. It then "sank into itself" and lost itself in God, akin to a drop of water in the deep sea. Like Eckhart, Tauler perceived the journey to the ground of the soul as a return that enabled individuals to recognize that they had been in God from all eternity, before their creation as creatures. "When he was in him, man was God in God."

A fundamental distinction between Eckhart's perspective and Tauler's is that Tauler regarded the ground of the soul as a created entity. Although he regarded the ground of the soul as the place where God "works" in the soul or, as he put it, where the soul "has" God, he did not identify the ground with the Godhead. Rather, he taught that when the uncreated divine abyss meets the created human abyss, one abyss flows into the other; then "the created nothingness sinks into the uncreated nothingness". By emphasising the creatureliness of the ground of the soul, Tauler carefully distanced himself from possible interpretations of his statements that could have placed his spirituality in the vicinity of Eckhart's theses, which were condemned by the Church as heretical. Moreover, in contrast to Eckhart, he did not regard the ground as incorruptible; rather, he cautioned against the potential for harmful influences from created things to lead to the ground becoming entangled in evil. He urged his followers to cultivate the ground of the soul with great diligence, as a farmer would his field, and to eradicate the weeds.

In contrast to Eckhart, Tauler explicitly referenced his personal experience in one of his sermons. He asserted that if an individual had attained a state of spiritual purity and remained therein, they would become a divine abode, wherein God would reside. Nevertheless, he posited that such piety was beyond the capacity of the human body, which was unable to sustain it. He himself had not yet reached this stage in his own experience. Although a teacher shouldn't espouse a doctrine that he has not personally experienced, it is sufficient that he is in sympathy with it and has it in mind, and that it does not impede his own spiritual progress.

=== Heinrich Seuse ===
The Dominican Heinrich Seuse (d. 1366), a disciple of Meister Eckhart, adopted the principal tenets of his concept of the ground of the soul. Nevertheless, he seldom employed the term "ground" to delineate the ground of the soul. He frequently employed the term "ground of the heart," which, in certain instances, served to delineate the heart with particular emphasis. In his Büchlein der Wahrheit, he elucidated that the multiplicity of attributes and designations ascribed to God, including the "Trinity", was, in essence and in the "basis" (of the Godhead), a "simple unity". The ground represents the nature and essence of the Godhead. It is a "silent darkness floating in". His own work is the birthing process, which, if one were to express it in the manner of human reason, could be described as "Godhead has swung to God". When queried as to whether this was not the same thing, Seuse replied that God and the Godhead were indeed one, but that the Godhead did not work and give birth; only God did that. This is how one should conceive of it, as human reason requires such an "otherness" to be able to comprehend. Consequently, however, we are misled by our imagination, because we view the divine in a way that corresponds to the way a creature perceives it, and this is not appropriate to divine truth. In reality, it is a unified entity.

Although Seuse thus indicated the limitations of reason in comprehending the divine, he emphasised the "high nobility" of "reasonableness" in the tradition of Eckhart and lauded the "God-like" reason of man. According to his teachings, the supreme, "super-being" spirit ennobled man by shining into him from his eternal divinity, and therefore God's image is "in the rational mind, which is also eternal". The "silent simplicity" of the unnamed and "wayless" Godhead is a living reasonableness that understands itself. Seuse employed a paradoxical formulation by Eckhart, describing the "ground" as "groundless." This concept can be understood as an "abysmalness" that seems to have no ground. In this regard as well, he asserted that divine reality differs from human perception. The abyss that appears unfathomable to the creature is, in fact, "fathomable" (grúntlich).

Eckhart's concept of the breakthrough, as outlined by Seuse, is the powerful externalising impact into the divine "nothing" which is in the "ground." This impact eradicates all difference, not according to being, but only according to human perception (nach nemunge únser halb). It is therefore evident that the act of union between God and humanity is perceived differently by each individual. While it may appear to abolish the difference between the two, in actuality, nothing changes. The prerequisite for this union is the taming of the soul forces, which is achieved by the serene human being. According to the doctrine of Seuse, in the ideal case, if this taming were to succeed completely, the whole universe would be revealed to the person, who would then see into himself. The union of the soul with the divinity requires a special grace, as it does not occur naturally.

=== Nicholas of Cusa ===
In the 1440s, the 14th-century dispute over Eckhart's doctrine of the uncreated nature of the ground of the soul was resurrected. In 1440, the philosopher and theologian Nicholas of Cusa (Cusanus) set forth his views in his work De docta ignorantia (On Learned Ignorance), which met with vehement opposition from the Heidelberg theology professor Johannes Wenck. In 1442/43, Wenck published a pamphlet entitled De ignota litteratura (On Unknown Scholarship), in which he accused Nicholas of pantheistic heresy and irrationalism. In 1449, the accused responded with the counter-pamphlet Apologia doctae ignorantiae (Defence of Learned Ignorance). Wenck's primary target was the doctrine of the unity of opposites (coincidentia oppositorum) in the infinity of the One, as presented in De docta ignorantia. He held the conviction that this would obliterate all scientific thought, as the tenets of logic would be set aside. The guiding idea of Cusanus was derived from Eckhart. In addition, Wenck cited Eckhart's thesis, which he was only aware of from a Latin translation, that there is "a certain castle" in the soul, which is also called "Fünklein" and is so simple that even God can only contemplate this simplicity if he renounces his names and attributes. For Wenck, the doctrine of the ground of the soul was a condemnable likening of the Creator to the creature. Cusanus offered a defence of Eckhart, whom he praised and quoted, but did not question the justification of papal intervention. He considered Eckhart to be a capable thinker who held correct views, but whose sophisticated explanations were inaccessible to those uneducated and narrow-minded (such as Wenck) and could easily be misinterpreted. His works were therefore unsuitable for the general public; they should be kept under lock and key.

== Modern times ==
=== 16th and 17th century ===
In the 16th and 17th centuries, expressions referring to the ground of the soul were prevalent in spiritual literature. On occasion, such terminology was employed with explicit reference to Tauler, as evidenced by the works of the Benedictine Louis de Blois (1506–1566) and the Jesuit Maximilian van der Sandt (Sandaeus, 1578–1656). The Carmelite Teresa of Ávila (1515–1582) authored El castillo interior (The Inner Castle), a foundational text in her spiritual oeuvre. In this text, she describes the location of the soul where union with God occurs as the "deepest interior," the "abyss," and the "essence" of the soul, where the faculties of the soul have no influence. In its tranquil core, the soul experiences profound peace, yet simultaneously, it is susceptible to external challenges and afflictions. Teresa's explanations exhibit a striking resemblance to those of Tauler.

John of the Cross (d. 1591), also a member of the Carmelite order, employed the term "ground of the soul" (fondo del alma) to refer to the "centre of the soul". In his work Llama de amor viva (Living Flame of Love), he delineated the contact and union of the soul with God, its Bridegroom. The text refers to the "awakening" of God "in the centre and at the bottom" of the soul. The ground of the soul is defined as "its pure and innermost being" (la pura e intima sustancia de ella). God resides there in secret as her sole Lord, in close union with her (estrechamente unido), and performs his sweet embrace with her when she has freed herself from the ungodly. He dwells not only with those who love him, but also in the depths of all souls. Were this not the case, they could not exist. However, the nature of his presence is contingent upon the individual's attitude. In the souls in which there are no images, forms or inclinations towards anything created, God dwells as in his own house; in the others, which are oriented towards worldly things, he dwells like a stranger in someone else's house. His presence at the lowest ebb of the soul is concealed, as neither the devil nor the human mind inclined to explore it is able to gain access. Those who have not yet been united with God are typically unaware of his presence in their souls.

The nun Marie of the Incarnation (1599–1672) placed particular emphasis on the experience of the presence of God in the soul. In addition, she delineated the ground of the soul as the abode of God, the uppermost part of the soul, and the innermost part of the soul. In her descriptions of spiritual experiences, she employed phrases such as "I was strongly drawn into the bottom of my inner being" and "completely withdrawn into the ground of the soul." Additionally, she employed the term "centre of the soul." She referred to the centre of the soul as God's dwelling place, at times equating it with the God present in the soul.

=== 18th century ===
In the eighteenth century, expressions such as "Seelengrund" and "Herzensgrund" were commonly used in Pietist circles. In certain instances, the term "ground" was employed in a manner analogous to its usage in medieval times, signifying the "place" of a person's union with God, as evidenced in Gerhard Tersteegen's work. However, in other instances, the terms underwent a significant transformation, acquiring a meaning that was starkly divergent from their original connotations. Individuals began to speak of an "evil ground" of the heart, which was perceived as corrupt and distant from God. The terms were increasingly secularised. This development was already foreshadowed in Pietistic literature and then fully elaborated upon in the movement of sentimentalism. The concept of the soul or heart in a secular sense was defined as the seat of strong, deep and authentic feelings, for example in the sense of "friendship of the soul". In some instances, a religious connotation remained, albeit to varying degrees, while in others, the Christian background was entirely absent.

In addition, a distinct philosophical interpretation of the term emerged in Enlightenment circles during the 18th century. The ground of the soul was conceived as a domain of "dark" cognition, in contrast to the clear, distinct, and therefore correct cognition demanded by René Descartes. The term "dark" was used to describe knowledge that was based solely on simple sensory perception, without the object of knowledge being determined based on its characteristic features. In 1739, the Enlightenment philosopher Alexander Gottlieb Baumgarten introduced the Latin term fundus animae ("ground of the soul") to describe the mental realm in which "dark perceptions" were located. Although Baumgarten excluded this area as an object of aesthetic analysis, he tended to evaluate darkness positively. He saw a possible enrichment in the ground of the soul, as it contained "perfections of sensual cognition". In his understanding, the concepts of dark and clear cognition are not mutually exclusive, but rather intertwined. The dark is involved in every human cognition of non-simple things and facts. In contrast to ignorance, which Baumgarten regarded as a purely negative phenomenon, he identified the dark knowledge that emerges from the depths of the soul as having considerable value. In 1752, Georg Friedrich Meier, a pupil of Baumgarten, posited that dark knowledge constituted the chaos within the soul, which was processed by its creative power and from which it gradually assembled all clear knowledge. Johann Georg Sulzer posited that the "dark ideas" constituted the unconscious causes of behaviour that was difficult to explain. In 1758, he posited that it was the "matters hidden in the innermost part of the soul" that caused people to act and speak inappropriately and against their own intentions.

Johann Gottfried Herder (1744–1803) posited that the ground of the soul constituted the foundation of his anthropology. In his analysis of Baumgarten's aesthetics, he posited that "our strength as human beings lies in the ground of the soul". Herder regarded the "dark abyss of the human soul" as the site where the sensations of the animal become the sensations of a human being and commingle, as it were, from afar with the soul. It is also the abyss of dark thoughts "from which instincts, affects, pleasure and displeasure subsequently emerge". Herder postulated that the soul is a composite entity, with the dark aspect prevailing to a greater extent. He posited that the dark was the primordial origin from which all human development was derived; human existence was determined by the coexistence of darkness and light. He made the following observation: "The whole ground of our soul is dark ideas, the most vivid, the most, the mass, from which the soul prepares its finer ones, the strongest driving forces of our life, the greatest contribution to our happiness and unhappiness." Herder evaluated this finding in a positive light in the context of his concept of the development of the individual, as he believed that all clear ideas and human concepts emerged from the dark ground of the soul. In 1778, he posited that the cognitive and volitional soul is the image of the divine, striving to imprint this image on all that surrounds it. It withdraws into itself, resting as it were on itself, and is thus able to "turn and overcome a universe". It accomplishes its deeds with the exalted feeling of being a daughter of God. Consequently, it contemplates its own essence, perceiving the source of its faculties and accomplishments in its intrinsic darkness. Every higher degree of ability, of attention and detachment, of wilfulness and freedom can be found "in this dark ground of the most intimate attraction and awareness of itself, its power, its inner life".

=== 19th and early 20th century ===
At the turn of the 18th and 19th centuries, there was a notable increase in interest in medieval spirituality, initially among romantically-minded laypeople and subsequently also among scholars. In the 19th century, research into late medieval spiritual literature was similarly influenced by buzzwords and ideas that have been criticised in more recent studies as problematic and sometimes misleading. Eckhart's reception was particularly affected by this phenomenon. The thesis that the innermost part of the human soul was uncreated and godlike, and the demand for the deification of man, were often categorised as pantheistic or tending towards pantheism. However, there was also opposition to this. Some statements in the pantheism controversy were linked to assessments that were influenced by the respective ideological position of the person making the judgement; confessional perspectives asserted themselves. Furthermore, the doctrine of the absolute undifferentiated nature of the deity and its equation with the innermost part of the human soul was considered "mystical" in the sense of a contrast to the rational way of thinking and argumentation of the scholastic scholars of the late Middle Ages.

The research of the Dominican Henry Denifle (1844–1905) represented a pivotal moment in the field. Denifle demonstrated that Eckhart's thought was rooted in the scholastic tradition. However, from a Thomistic perspective, he harshly criticized him as an incompetent scholastic who had partially adopted older ideas and partially held confused, "pathological" views. His theology, insofar as it was original, was untenable and the condemnation of his ideas by the Church was entirely justified. Cusanus had misrepresented Eckhart's position in response to Wenck's criticism. Although Eckhart was not a true pantheist, he had put forward individual pantheistic theses. Denifle responded to previous research by criticising it and accusing Protestant scholars of bias. His incisive assertion encountered some resistance from experts, yet it exerted a profound and enduring impact on research. Martin Grabmann (1875–1949), a student of Denifle, advocated his teacher's interpretation and shared his value judgement. He proceeded to align Eckhart's concept of God with Averroism, a medieval doctrine that posits the unity of the intellect. For the Averroists, this unity is universal, negating the notion of individual immortality of the soul. Notable figures who espoused a contrasting perspective were Otto Karrer (1888–1976) and Alois Dempf (1891–1982). They considered Eckhart's position, including the basic doctrine of the soul, to be consistent and justifiable within the framework of Catholicism.

The conventional image of Eckhart as a non-rational mystic persisted in the public consciousness and became even more entrenched in the first half of the 20th century. This was frequently associated with the notion that his comprehension of God and the soul reflected a typically German disposition and exhibited an anti-church inclination. Herman Büttner's translation of the Middle High German works into modern German played a significant role in the shaping and popularisation of an anti-Catholic image of Eckhart. The work was first published by Eugen Diederichs in 1903-1909 and had a profound and far-reaching impact. Büttner translated the works with considerable freedom, incorporating his own interpretations. His central thesis was that when individuals descend into the depths of their souls, they also experience the world's foundation, the "one eternal foundation." The experience of being one with God is a state of bliss. Those who have experienced God within themselves no longer require an external mediator or saviour; the church is then perceived as superfluous. Notable intellectuals such as Julius Hart (1859–1930), Arthur Drews (1865–1935) and Leopold Ziegler (1881–1958) concurred with Büttner's perspective or espoused similar ideas.

The Neo-Kantian Paul Natorp (1854–1924), like many of his contemporaries, regarded the doctrine of the ground of the soul as the foundation of a "peculiarly German worldview". He was enthusiastic about the doctrine and saw it as an important contribution to the development of German philosophy. Natorp found Eckhart's language to be that of the discoverer, who expressed "things never heard" and who was not bound by any dogma or written or spoken word. For Eckhart, only that which he could affirm "from his own innermost experience of God" was binding. He assumed that God and the soul were in exclusive dialogue. The soul's becoming one with God was the eternal incarnation of God and at the same time humanity's becoming God. In Natorp's understanding, the "letting go" of everything created and even of God himself as a prerequisite for the birth of God in the human soul "does not mean a throwing away, but rather a radical abstraction that intends nothing other than to go back to the ultimate inner point from which, like all and every division, even the ultimate opposition of God and soul is understood in the first place". This results in the liberation from the mediating office of the church and any mediating authority, as well as from the consciousness of sin, the "worst tormentor of the soul of medieval people". From the doctrine of the ground of the soul follows "an elevation of the human spirit such as has never been expressed before and could not be surpassed by anything later".

=== Newer research ===
==== The role of intellect ====
The role of the intellect or reason is a topic that is frequently discussed in studies and debates on the grounds of the soul and one that is strongly emphasised in much of the recent research literature. In his 2010 monograph on Eckhart, Kurt Flasch notes that the doctrine of the birth of God, "which at first sounds simple and pious, entangles the reader in philosophical premises". Eckhart did not regard the birth of God at the bottom of the soul as a "supernatural additional gift" from God, but rather as a process intrinsic to the nature of the soul. Flasch posits that Eckhart equated the nature of the soul with the intellect, thereby providing a philosophical answer to the question of what is the highest in the soul. He was convinced that the intellect was capable of recognizing the fundamental nature of the soul, "namely itself". This approach had often been overlooked, which had led to misinterpretations. In particular, Flasch criticised the view of the renowned Germanist Josef Quint (1898–1976), who undertook the critical editing of Eckhart's sermons and their translation into modern German. Until the 1970s, Quint held a dominant position in the field through the publication of text editions and interpretations, which contributed to the perpetuation of an erroneous irrationalist interpretation. In essence, Eckhart as a philosopher placed particular emphasis on his claim that he spoke following natural reason, that is to say, that he did not presuppose any beliefs in his arguments. In his vernacular sermons on the birth of God, he also sought to persuade his audience through rational arguments, rather than by appealing to the authority of the Bible.

In contrast, Otto Langer offers a distinct perspective. He asserts that an attempt to comprehend the doctrine of the ground of the soul through the lens of a theory of the intellect is misguided. Rather, the correct understanding can be gained from ethical practice. Eckhart posited that the correct form of self-love is to be found in the concept of "humanity," which he defined as the essence of the human condition. He further asserted that the correct form of love for one's neighbour is to be found in the concept of "humanity" in others. Eckhart's teachings imply that a person who lives in accordance with their nature, or "humanity," is one with God. In loving one's fellow human being, the individual is able to perceive the potential for union with the divine at the core of their being.

==== The question of personal experience ====
The question of whether there is a personal experience behind Eckhart's statements about the birth of God at the ground of the soul, and in what sense such an experience should be interpreted, is answered differently. From the absence of any commentary on this matter, previous researchers have concluded that his works set out a "spiritual mysticism" that was not based on the author's own experience. Kurt Ruh offered a counterargument to this hypothesis. He reached the conclusion that both the content of Eckhart's teachings about the ground of the soul and how he expressed himself "in an emphatic-charismatic manner of speaking" presupposed personal experience. Moreover, Eckhart made a veiled confession of such experience. It is therefore necessary to understand his affirmations of truth in this sense. Shizuteru Ueda and Peter Reiter expressed similar opinions.

Alois M. Haas approached this question from a distinct vantage point. He maintained that it was erroneous to describe the "mystical experience that Eckhart is said to have had". This overlooks the fact that such an expression does not do justice to Eckhart's understanding of the relationship between eternity and time. With him, the category of the new is taken out of the realm of the experiential. The term "breakthrough" is open to misinterpretation when translated into the categorical realm of human experience. Eckhart was not preoccupied with isolated individual experiences of God or experiences of union with God. Rather, the breakthrough consisted in the revelation of humanity's oneness with God as a fundamental human concept. Eckhart's approach was characterised by a "lack of interest in all forms of psychological concretisation". For him, isolated, punctual experience as the perception of an object or a mental event as a present one fell under the category of "property", and was therefore one of the things whose elimination was a prerequisite for the birth of God. Nevertheless, it is appropriate to describe the breakthrough as an "experience" if one does not misunderstand this term in a psychological sense.

Erwin Waldschütz's position is analogous. He assumed that Eckhart himself had engaged in a process of introspection, which could be understood as a "ground experience" rather than a vision of God in the sense of an esoteric act. He was not concerned with the individual experiences of the senses or the mind, but rather with the concept of experience itself, in its most fundamental sense. This is a "completely independent mode of human self-expression" that can be clearly distinguished from cognition, volition, feeling and perception and is capable of justifying the other modes of self-expression. The fundamental characteristics of the basic experience are affectivity and incorporation, inaccessibility, lack of wisdom, openness to the whole and to every person, commitment and the urge for interpretation and communication.

Bernard McGinn posited that for Eckhart, constant oneness with God was not an "experience" in the conventional sense of the term, nor was it an act of knowing "something." Instead, it represented a novel mode of knowing and acting. This occurs when an individual attempts to relate all their actions to the unified identity of the ground.

==== The question of individuality and subjectivity ====
The question of the role that can be attributed to the individual and the individuated in Eckhart's philosophy, given the absolute undifferentiated nature of his Godhead and Seelengrund, is a matter of contention in recent research. One school of thought, which includes Kurt Flasch, Burkhard Mojsisch, Loris Sturlese and Saskia Wendel, interprets the doctrine of the ground of the soul as an expression of the idea of the subject. In such interpretations, Eckhart is sometimes credited with an understanding of subjectivity that makes his concept appear to be a precursor of modern transcendental philosophy. Other researchers (Alois Haas, Otto Langer, Niklaus Largier) are unequivocally opposed to the subject-theoretical interpretation and consider it to be entirely misguided.

Burkhard Mojsisch presents his subject-theoretical interpretation clearly and concisely. He aims to challenge the conventional view that a philosophical theory of the self was absent from the theorists of the Middle Ages, with Eckhart serving as a pivotal figure in this regard. Eckhart addresses the self as such, that is, the person insofar as they are nothing other than the self, free from any commonality with others, including God, that determines the self as self. The subject of Eckhart's theory is the self-development of a transcendental self, which is free from any presupposition and self-founded. It is constituted by the freedom of its self-determination. The self, which exists in the concrete reality of individuality, is aware of and desires only itself as a self. It is identical with the ground of the soul. Saskia Wendel largely aligns with Mojsisch's findings. Wendel posits that Eckhart's demand for reflexive self-knowledge as a gathering within and sinking into the ground of the soul presupposes what modern philosophy considers to be the subject. His realisation of the absolute can be described as an intellectual view in the sense of the idealist philosopher Johann Gottlieb Fichte. For Fichte, the intellectual view was nothing other than the realisation of the absolute self. This was inevitably linked to the idea of the subject, not only in Fichte's work but already in Eckhart's work. The fundamental tenet of the soul does not result in the dissolution of the individual, but rather in their independence and singularity. This is maintained because the human self is the condition for the uniqueness and particularity of the individual. Consequently, the salvation of individuality is contingent upon the subjectivity of the individual, which is expressed in the "I".

Mojsisch's interpretation was subjected to vehement criticism by Otto Langer and Alois Haas. Langer asserts that Eckhart lacks a comprehensive theory of the self. He does not employ the term "I" in the sense of a theory of intellect, but rather in a functional manner. The concept of the ground of the soul should not be interpreted as synonymous with the self. Alois M. Haas considers the definition of the ego as a transcendental being to be a "grotesque over-interpretation" of Eckhart's statements. Individuality was not a subject of his thinking; rather, it was a presupposed obstacle which he sought to remove. He pursued the systematic destruction of the self. For him, the concept of human autonomy was only conceivable in the context of being one with God. It is not permissible to reinterpret divine autonomy as human autonomy, as is often done in more recent research on Eckhart. Haas considers Eckhart's concept of the soul's ground or soul spark to be a radical concept of the creature's absolute dependence on God, "which hardly allows the creature the chance of ontological independence". Eckhart's espousal of the doctrine of the absolute equality of man and God and his exposition of it from a variety of perspectives renders him a figure of great normative significance in the domain of spiritual life. Erwin Waldschütz's also rejects the intellectual-theoretical interpretation of the "ground". He rejects the interpretation of the birth of God as the condition of the possibility of the self, which he considers to be a "degrading" interpretation. Eckhart sought to transcend any assertion of a self, regardless of its subtlety. He did not assume any identity between the fundamental being of God and that of man or the soul in terms of being; the reason could not be grasped in terms of being. Rather, the ground-being is a being-in-relation and relationship-creating entity. Identity is demonstrated to be the sameness of the relationship, which is only ever realised in an event.

Karl Heinz Witte posits that Eckhart did not regard the individual as an accidental and inconsequential entity. The birth of God is always contingent upon the existence of a specific individual. For Eckhart, the concept of salvation or righteousness is not an objective reality, but rather something that is attained individually. The outcome is contingent upon the individual in question. This, however, is "not a quiddity that I have or am predicatively", nor an empirical self with its personal characteristics and history. For Eckhart, this belongs to the created and therefore the void. Rather, it is about the concept of "I" as a pure, attributeless, eternal being, or rather, as "my is," a non-ontological "is" or "I".

== Literature ==
=== Overviews ===
- Heidrich, Peter (1995). "Seelengrund". Historisches Wörterbuch der Philosophie (in German). Vol. 9. Basel: Schwabe. pp. 93–94.
- Fischer, Héribert; Jetté, Fernand (1964). "Fond de l'âme". Dictionnaire de Spiritualité (in French). Vol. 5. Paris: Beauchesne. pp. 650–666.

=== General analyses ===
- McGinn, Bernard (2008). Die Mystik im Abendland (1300 - 1500) (in German). Vol. 4. Freiburg: Herder. ISBN 978-3-451-23384-5
- Reiter, Peter (1993). Der Seele Grund: Meister Eckhart und die Tradition der Seelenlehre (in German). Würzburg: Königshausen & Neumann. ISBN 978-3-88479-807-2
- Wendel, Saskia (2002). Affektiv und inkarniert: Ansätze deutscher Mystik als subjekttheoretische Herausforderung (in German). Regensburg: Friedrich Pustet. ISBN 978-3-7917-1824-8

=== Investigations into the ground of the soul in Meister Eckhart ===
- Dietsche, Bernward (1960). "Der Seelengrund nach den deutschen und lateinischen Predigten". In Nix, Udo; Öchslin, Raphael (eds.). Meister Eckhart der Prediger. Festschrift zum Eckhart-Gedenkjahr (in German). Freiburg: Herder. pp. 200–258.
- Guerizoli, Rodrigo (2006). Die Verinnerlichung des Göttlichen: eine Studie über den Predigtzyklus Von der êwigen geburt und die Armutspredigt Meister Eckharts (in German). Leiden: Brill. ISBN 978-90-04-15000-3
- Ueda, Shizuteru (1965). Die Gottesgeburt in der Seele und der Durchbruch zur Gottheit (in German). Gütersloh: Karl Alber.
- Waldschütz, Erwin (1989). Denken und Erfahren des Grundes: zur philosophischen Deutung Meister Eckharts (in German). Wien: Herder. ISBN 978-3-210-24927-8

=== Studies on the ground of the soul by other authors ===
- Enders, Markus (2008). Gelassenheit und Abgeschiedenheit: Studien zur Deutschen Mystik (in German). Hamburg: Dr. Kovac. ISBN 978-3-8300-3636-4
- Wrede, Gösta (1974). Unio mystica: Probleme der Erfahrung bei Johannes Tauler (in German). Uppsala: Almqvist & Wiksell. ISBN 978-91-554-0238-9
- Wyser, Paul (1958). "Der Seelengrund in Taulers Predigten". Lebendiges Mittelalter. Festgabe für Wolfgang Stammler (in German). Fribourg: Universitätsverlag. pp. 204–311.
