= Unity of opposites =

Central category of dialectics

Balancing the seesaw with differing number of balls on either side by the movement of triangle results in the unity of opposites, said to arrive at unity on triangle

The unity of opposites (coincidentia oppositorum or coniunctio) is the philosophical idea that opposites are interconnected by the way each is defined in relation to the other. Their interdependence unites the seemingly opposed terms.

The unity of opposites is sometimes equated with the identity of opposites, but this is mistaken as the unity formed by the opposites does not require them to be identical.

== Ancient philosophy ==
The unity of opposites was first suggested to the western view by Heraclitus (c. 535 – c. 475 BC), a pre-Socratic Greek thinker. Philosophers had for some time been contemplating the notion of opposites. Anaximander posited that every element had an opposite, or was connected to an opposite (water is cold, fire is hot). Thus, the material world was said to be composed of an infinite, boundless apeiron from which arose the elements (earth, air, fire, water) and pairs of opposites (hot/cold, wet/dry). There was, according to Anaximander, a continual war of opposites.

Anaximenes of Miletus, a student and successor of Anaximander, replaced this infinite, boundless arche with air, a known element with neutral properties. According to Anaximenes, there was not so much a war of opposites, as a continuum of change.

Heraclitus, however, did not accept the Milesian monism and replaced their underlying material arche with a single, divine law of the universe, which he called Logos. The universe of Heraclitus is in constant change, while remaining the same. That is to say, when an object moves from point A to point B, a change is created, while the underlying law remains the same. Thus, a unity of opposites is present in the universe simultaneously containing difference and sameness. An aphorism of Heraclitus illustrates the idea as follows:

The road up and the road down are the same thing. (Hippolytus, Refutations 9.10.3)

This is an example of a compresent unity of opposites. For, at the same time, this slanted road has the opposite qualities of ascent and descent. According to Heraclitus, everything is in constant flux, and every changing object contains at least one pair of opposites (though not necessarily simultaneously) and every pair of opposites is contained in at least one object.

Heraclitus also uses the succession of opposites as a basis for change:

Cold things grow hot, hot things grow cold, a moist thing withers, a parched thing is wetted. (DK B126)

An object persists despite opposite properties, even as it undergoes change.

== Medieval philosophy ==
=== Coincidentia oppositorum ===
Coincidentia oppositorum is a Latin phrase meaning coincidence of opposites. It is a neoplatonic term attributed to 15th century German polymath Nicholas of Cusa in his essay, De Docta Ignorantia (1440). Mircea Eliade, a 20th-century historian of religion, used the term extensively in his essays about myth and ritual, describing the coincidentia oppositorum as "the mythical pattern". Psychiatrist Carl Jung, the philosopher and Islamic Studies professor Henry Corbin as well as Jewish philosophers Gershom Scholem and Abraham Joshua Heschel also used the term. For example, Michael Maier stresses that in alchemy, coincidentia oppositorum, the union of opposites is the aim of the alchemical work. Or, according to Paracelsus' pupil, Gerhard Dorn, the highest grade of the alchemical coniunctio consisted in the union of the total man with the unus mundus ("one world").

The term is also used in describing a revelation of the oneness of things previously believed to be different. Such insight into the unity of things is a kind of immanence, and is found in various non-dualist and dualist traditions. The idea occurs in the traditions of Tantric Hinduism and Buddhism, in German mysticism, Zoroastrianism, Taoism, Zen and Sufism, among others.

== Modern philosophy ==
Dialecticians claim that unity or identity of opposites can exist in reality or in thought. If the opposites were completely balanced, the result would be stasis, but often one of the pairs of opposites is larger, stronger or more powerful than the other, such that over time, one of the opposed conditions prevails over the other. When this happens, it undermines unity, because unity depends on a robust duality of opposites. Only when the opposites are balanced is unity made manifest. It is the stable tension between the opposites that accounts for the unity, and in fact, the opposites presuppose one another analytically. For example, 'upward' cannot exist unless there is a 'downward', they are opposites but they co-substantiate one another, their unity is that either one exists because the opposite is necessary for the existence of the other, one manifests immediately with the other. Hot would not be hot without cold, due to there being no contrast by which to define it as 'hot' relative to any other condition, it would not and could not have identity whatsoever if not for its very opposite that makes the necessary prerequisite existence for the opposing condition to be. This is the oneness, unity, principle to the very existence of any opposite. Either one's identity is the contra-posing principle itself, necessitating the other. The criteria for what is opposite is therefore something a priori.

In response to the original conception by Friedrich Schelling of the dialectic in his philosophical work System of Transcendental Idealism, Samuel Taylor Coleridge formed the concept of "esemplasticity", which is the ability of the imagination to unify opposites in his work Biographia Literaria. This concept allowed Coleridge to bridge Schelling's perpetual dialectic (where a thesis has an antithesis, which forms a synthesis that becomes a new thesis which starts a new dialectic) with Coleridge's ideal notion of Trinitarian perfection according to Christian church doctrine. Coleridge's basic belief was that within the holy trinity, all things were perfected; but humanity had experienced a 'fall' which resulted in the ongoing imperfect process of dialectic within each individual, which the imagination could unify through 'esemplasticity' (a translation of Schelling's "In-eins-bildung", literally "in-one-building", translated as 'incorporation'). See the missing transcendental deduction.

In his criticism of Immanuel Kant, the German philosopher Georg Wilhelm Friedrich Hegel tried to systematise dialectical understandings and thus wrote:

The principles of the metaphysical philosophy gave rise to the belief that, when cognition lapsed into contradictions, it was a mere accidental aberration, due to some subjective mistake in argument and inference. According to Kant, however, thought has a natural tendency to issue in contradictions or antinomies, whenever it seeks to apprehend the infinite. We have in the latter part of the above paragraph referred to the philosophical importance of the antinomies of reason, and shown how the recognition of their existence helped largely to get rid of the rigid dogmatism of the metaphysic of understanding, and to direct attention to the Dialectical movement of thought. But here too Kant, as we must add, never got beyond the negative result that the thing-in-itself is unknowable, and never penetrated to the discovery of what the antinomies really and positively mean. That true and positive meaning of the antinomies is this: that every actual thing involves a coexistence of opposed elements. Consequently to know, or, in other words, to comprehend an object is equivalent to being conscious of it as a concrete unity of opposed determinations. The old metaphysic, as we have already seen, when it studied the objects of which it sought a metaphysical knowledge, went to work by applying categories abstractly and to the exclusion of their opposites.

In his philosophy, Hegel ventured to describe quite a few cases of "unity of opposites", including the concepts of Finite and Infinite, Force and Matter, Identity and Difference, Positive and Negative, Form and Content, Chance and Necessity, Cause and effect, Freedom and Necessity, Subjectivity and Objectivity, Means and Ends, Subject and Object, and Abstract and Concrete. It is also considered to be integral to Marxist philosophy of nature and is discussed in Friedrich Engels' Dialectics of Nature.

== See also ==
- Anekantavada – Jain doctrine of many-sidedness
- Androgynos (mythology) – Primordial being in comparative mythology
- Dialectical monism – Ontological position that holds that reality is ultimately a unified whole
- Esemplastic – Qualitative adjective
- Enantiodromia – Principle introduced by Carl Jung
- Hieros gamos – Divine marriage
- Holon (philosophy) – Something that is simultaneously a whole and a part
- Hypernymy and hyponymy – Semantic relations involving the type-of property
- Microcosm–macrocosm analogy – Analogy between man and cosmos
- Negation – Logical operation
- Organic unity – Concept in philosophy
- Rebis – Concept in alchemy
- Syzygy
- Tantra – Esoteric traditions of Hinduism and Buddhism
- Unity in diversity – Expression of harmony and unity between dissimilar individuals or groups
- Yinyang – Cosmological dualism in Chinese philosophy
