= Caledonian Antisyzygy =

Idea in Scottish psyche and literature

The term Caledonian Antisyzygy refers to the "idea of dueling polarities within one entity", thought of as typical for the Scottish psyche and literature. The term, which is derived from the Greek word syzygy (conjunction or alignment), derived from zygon (yoke), specifically refers to the so-called "Scottish disjunction".

== Origin ==
Caledonian Antisyzygy was first coined by G. Gregory Smith in response to the view - especially that espoused by figures such as T.S. Eliot - that there is no value in Scottish provincial literature, noting an absence of coherence and an anchor in a single language. Smith argued that such diversity or the union of opposites forms the basis of Scottish literature. While merging of opposites is not a unique cultural or racial trait, it is said that such contradiction became apotheosized among the Scots. In his 1919 book Scottish Literature: Character and Influence, Smith wrote:

we find at closer scanning that the cohesion at least in formal expression and in choice of material is only apparent, that the literature is remarkably varied, and that it becomes, under the stress of foreign influence, almost a zigzag of contradictions. The antithesis need not, however, disconcert us. Perhaps in the very combination of opposites—what either of the two Thomases, of Norwich and Cromarty, might have been willing to call "the Caledonian antisyzygy"— we have a reflection of the contrasts which the Scot shows at every turn... we need not be surprised to find that in his literature the Scot presents two aspects which appear contradictory. Oxymoron was ever the bravest figure, and we must not forget that disorderly order is order after all.

The term has since been adopted by figures of the Scottish Renaissance of the 1920s such as Christopher Murray Grieve also known as Hugh MacDiarmid. The poet elaborated on the concept in his essay, The Caledonian Antisyzygy and the Gaelic Idea, published in two parts in The Modern Scot 1931–1932. The notion is most frequently cited in reference to the seemingly morally contradictory quality of the works of Robert Louis Stevenson (Strange Case of Dr Jekyll and Mr Hyde) and James Hogg (The Private Memoirs and Confessions of a Justified Sinner).

It is suggested that the emergence of Caledonian Antisyzygy as a tradition is associated with postmodernism, which resonates in Scotland not only due to the increasing cultural diversity in Britain but also because this genre features ontological shifts into worlds that are disjunct from reality. Scholars such as Randall Stevenson maintained that the Scottish literature itself often includes narratives that have "antisyzygical splits" or double words/double narratives as demonstrated in the case of Jekyll and Hyde as well as the focus on the contrasts between the Highlands and the Lowlands, Protestantism and Catholicism, Britishness and Scottishness, and others.

A disparaging interpretation refers to Caledonian Antisyzygy as the state of anguished examination of conscience and consciousness - a troubled posturing - that characterizes the mindset of Scottish intellectuals.

== Critiques ==
Within Scottish academia, the concept of 'Caledonian Antisyzygy' has been criticised by a new generation of literary scholars. These include, for instance, Gerard Carruthers (University of Glasgow) who condemned the essentialist (if not racialist) undertones of a concept strongly influenced by the racial dichotomy between the Saxon and Celtic ethnies as they were perceived in the nineteenth century. ' Likewise, Paul Malgrati has criticised the concept of 'Antisyzygy' for its eternalist conceit: a 'jail of paradoxes' preventing Scottish identity from developing in new, uncharted ways.

== See also ==
- Apollonian and Dionysian
- Steppenwolf
- Strange Case of Dr Jekyll and Mr Hyde
- The Private Memoirs and Confessions of a Justified Sinner
- Syzygy (disambiguation)
- Tartan Noir
- True Scotsman
- No True Scotsman
