= George Gregory Smith =

Scottish literary critic (1865–1932)

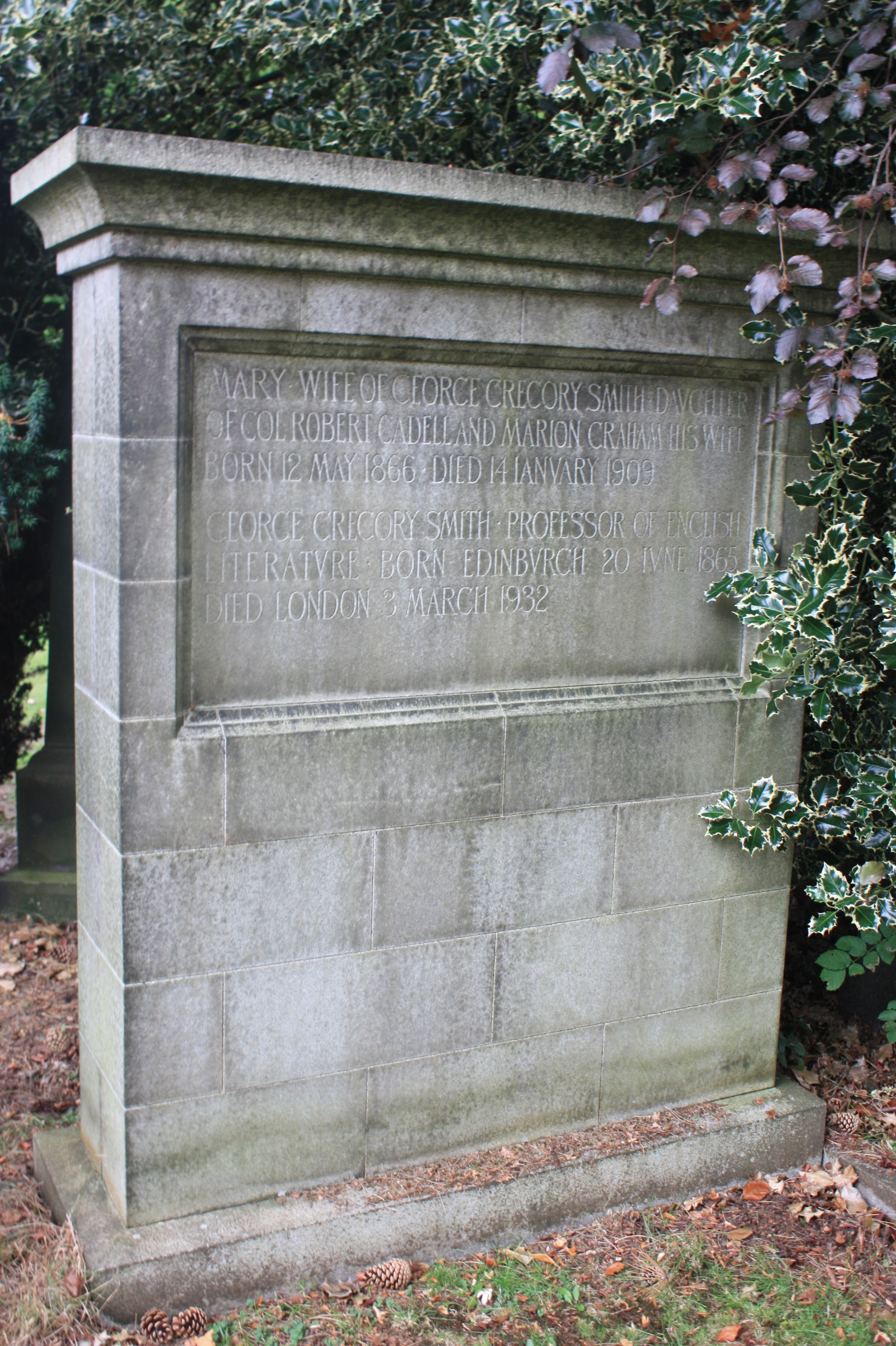
The grave of George Gregory Smith, Dean Cemetery

Prof George Gregory Smith (20 June 1865 – 3 March 1932) was a Scottish literary critic.

In his Scottish Literature: Character and Influence (1919) Smith coined the term 'Caledonian antisyzygy' to describe what he perceived as a union of opposites, or an oscilation between realism and the supernatural, in the work of Scottish authors. He corresponded with Mark Twain, and also lived in Florence for a while.

He died in London but is buried with his wife Mary east of the western path in Dean Cemetery in Edinburgh.

== Family ==
He was married to Mary Cadell (1866–1909) daughter of Col Robert Cadell. A son was the colonial administrator Henry Graham Gregory-Smith.

== Selected works ==
- The Days of James IV (1890)
- The Transition Period (1900)
- Specimens of Middle Scots (1902)
- Elizabethan Critical Essays, vol. I & vol. II (1904, editor)
- Scottish Literature: Character & Influence (1919).
