= Heymeric de Campo =

Heymeric de Campo (1395–1460) was a Dutch theologian and scholastic philosopher. He was a prominent Albertist, and forerunner of Nicholas of Cusa. He studied at the University of Paris, and taught at Cologne (where Nicholas studied under him), and Leuven.

His Tractatus Problematicus began a series of polemical exchanges between the Albertists and the Thomists. The first part deals with universals, following closely John de Nova Domo, Heymeric's teacher. A belated reply was made on behalf of the Thomists by Gerard de Monte.

He wrote a commentary on the Apocalypse, saw the Church as an organism, growing over time from one constitutional form to another.
