= Nicholas of Cusa =

German cardinal and philosopher (1401–1464)

His Eminence Nicholas of Cusa
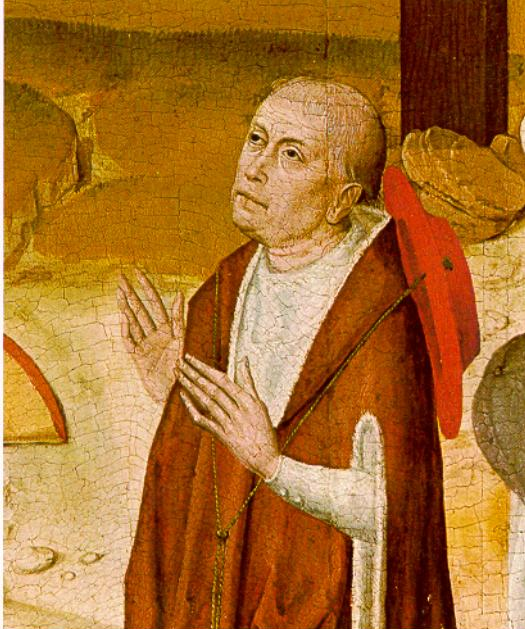
- Portrait by the Master of Wilten, c. 1480
- Born: 1401; Kues, Electorate of Trier, Holy Roman Empire
- Died: 11 August 1464 (aged 62–63); Todi, Umbria, Papal States
- Other names: Doctor Christianus, Nikolaus Cryfftz, Nicholas of Kues, Nicolaus Cusanus

Education
- Education: Heidelberg University; University of Padua

Philosophical work
- Era: Medieval philosophy Renaissance philosophy
- Region: Western philosophy
- School: Christian Neoplatonism; Renaissance humanism Christian humanism
- Main interests: Christian theology; Christian mysticism; mathematics
- Notable ideas: Learned ignorance, coincidence of opposites
- Bishop of Brixen
- Church: Catholic Church
- In office: 1450–1464
- Other post: Cardinal-Priest of San Pietro in Vincoli

Orders
- Ordination: 1436
- Consecration: 26 April 1450 by Pope Nicholas V
- Created cardinal: 20 December 1448 by Pope Nicholas V

Nicholas of Cusa (1401 – 11 August 1464), also referred to as Nicholas of Kues and Nicolaus Cusanus (/kjuːˈseɪnəs/), was a German Catholic bishop and polymath active as a philosopher, theologian, jurist, mathematician, and astronomer. One of the first German proponents of Renaissance humanism, he made spiritual and political contributions to European culture. A notable example of this is his mystical or spiritual writings on "learned ignorance", as well as his participation in power struggles between Rome and the German states of the Holy Roman Empire.

As papal legate to Germany from 1446, he was appointed cardinal for his merits by Pope Nicholas V in 1448 and Prince-Bishop of Brixen two years later. In 1459, he became vicar general in the Papal States. Nicholas has remained an influential figure. In 2001, the sixth centennial of his birth was celebrated on four continents and commemorated by publications on his life and work.

== Life ==
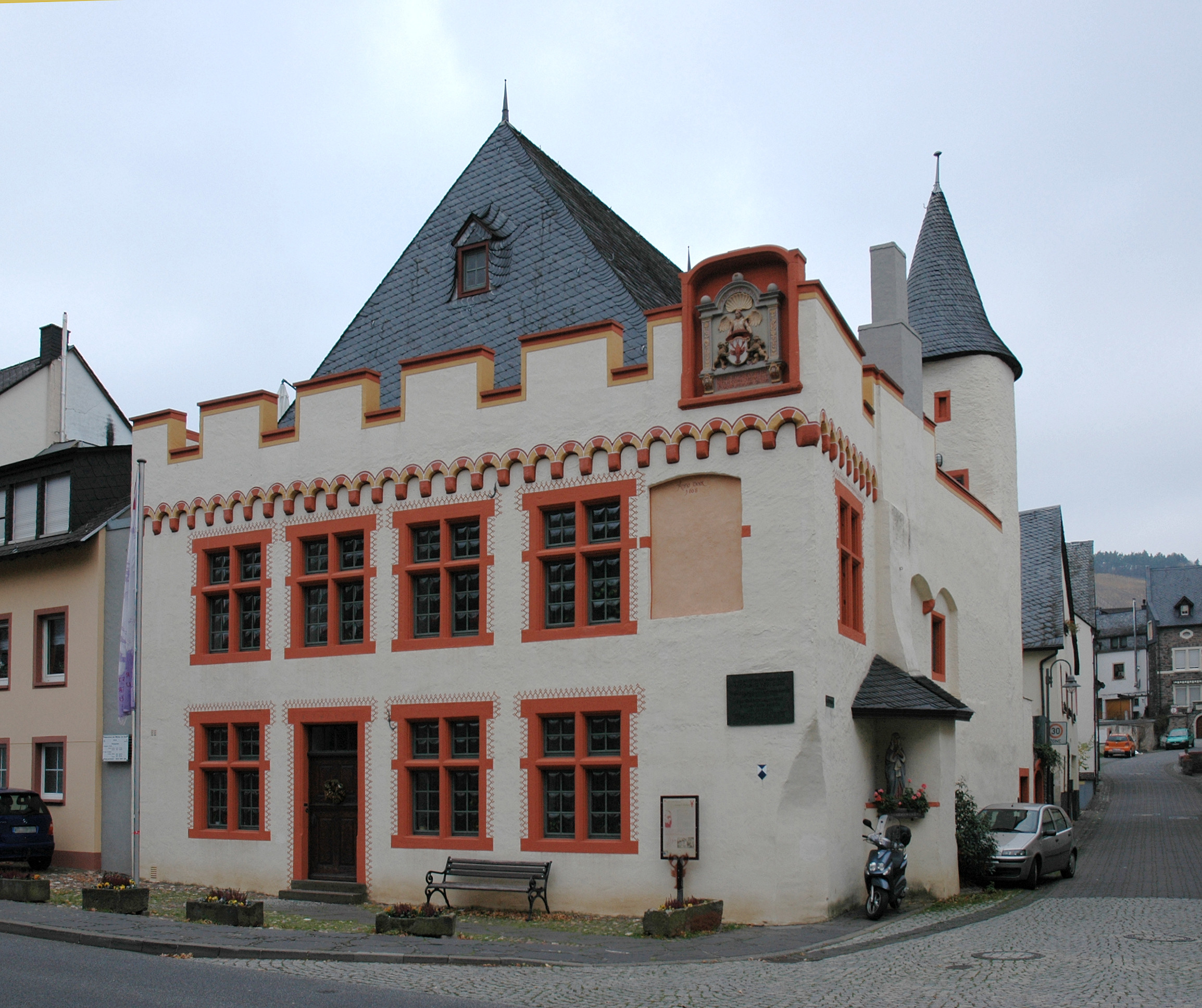
Birthplace in Kues

Nicholas was born in Kues (Latinized as "Cusa") in southwestern Germany. He was the second of four children of Johan Krebs (or Cryfftz) and Katherina Roemer. His father was "a prosperous boat owner and ferryman." His father seems to have provided for his early education with the Brethren of the Common Life at the Deventer preparatory school, after which Nicholas entered the Faculty of Arts of the Heidelberg University in 1416 as "a cleric of the Diocese of Trier," studying the liberal arts. He seemed to have left Heidelberg soon afterwards, as he received his doctorate in canon law from the University of Padua in 1423. In Padua, he met the later cardinals Julian Cesarini and Domenico Capranica and became friends with the mathematician Paolo dal Pozzo Toscanelli. Afterwards, he entered the University of Cologne in 1425 as "a doctor of canon law," which he appears to have both taught and practiced there. In Cologne, he made friends with the scholastic theologian Heymeric de Campo.

Following a brief period in Cologne, Nicholas returned to his hometown and became secretary to Otto of Ziegenhain, the Prince-Archbishop of Trier. Otto appointed him canon and dean at the stift of Saint Florinus in Koblenz affiliated with numerous prebends. In 1427 he was sent to Rome as an episcopal delegate. The next year he travelled to Paris to study the writings of Ramon Llull. At the same time he rejected a calling by the newly established University of Leuven. He acquired great knowledge in the research of ancient and medieval manuscripts as well as in textual criticism and the examination of primary sources. In 1433 he identified the Donation of Constantine as a fake, confirmed by Lorenzo Valla a few years later, and revealed the forgery of the Pseudo-Isidorian Decretals. He made friends with the Austrian astronomer Georg von Peuerbach and advocated a reform of the Julian calendar and the Easter computus, which, however, was not realized until the introduction of the Gregorian calendar in 1582.

After the Archbishop Otto of Trier had died in 1430, Pope Martin V appointed the Speyer bishop Raban of Helmstatt his successor. Nevertheless, the Electorate was contested by opposing parties, and in 1432 Nicholas attended the Council of Basel representing the Cologne dean Ulrich von Manderscheid, one of the claimants, who hoped to prevail against the new Pope Eugene IV. Nicholas stressed the determining influence of the cathedral chapter and its given right to participate in the succession policy, which even places the pope under an obligation to seek a consent. His efforts were to no avail in regard to Ulrich's ambitions; however, Nicholas's pleadings earned him a great reputation as an intermediary and diplomat. While present at the council, he wrote his first work, De concordantia catholica (The Catholic Concordance), a synthesis of ideas on church and empire balancing hierarchy with consent. This work remained useful to critics of the papacy long after Nicholas left Basel.

Initially as conciliarist, Nicholas approached his university friend Cardinal Julian Cesarini, who had tried to reconcile pope and council, combining reform and hierarchic order. Nicholas supported transfer of the council to Italy to meet with the Greeks, who needed aid against the Ottoman Turks. He arbitrated in the conflict with the Hussites. Between the summer of 1437 and early 1438 he was a member of the delegation sent to Constantinople with the pope's approval to bring back the Byzantine emperor and his representatives to the papally summoned Council of Florence of 1439, which was attempting to bring the Eastern Orthodox Church into union with the Western Catholic Church. The reunion achieved at this conference turned out to be very brief. Nicholas would later claim (in the postfaced dedicatory letter of On Learned Ignorance, which Nicholas finished writing on 12 February 1440) that he had chosen to write on this metaphysical topic because of a shipboard experience of divine illumination while on the ship returning from this mission to Constantinople.

After a successful career as a papal envoy, he was made a cardinal by Pope Nicholas V in 1448 or 1449. In 1450 he was both named Bishop of Brixen, in Tyrol, and commissioned as a papal legate to the German lands to spread the message of reform. In 1444, the White Tower of Brixen caught fire and in 1459 he commissioned its reconstruction in a Gothic style. This latter role, his 'Great Legation' of 1450–1452, involved travel of almost 3000 miles, preaching, teaching and reforming. He became known as the "Hercules of the Eugenian cause." His local councils enacted reforms, many of which were not successful. Pope Nicholas canceled some of Nicholas's decrees, and the effort to discourage pilgrimages to venerate the bleeding hosts of Wilsnack (the so-called Holy Blood of Wilsnack) was unsuccessful. His work as bishop between 1452 and 1458 – trying to impose reforms and reclaim lost diocesan revenues – was opposed by Duke Sigismund of Austria. The duke imprisoned Nicholas in 1460, for which Pope Pius II excommunicated Sigismund and laid an interdict on his lands. Nicholas returned to Rome, but was never able to return to his bishopric.

He died at Todi in Umbria on 11 August 1464. Sigismund's capitulation came a few days after Nicholas's death.

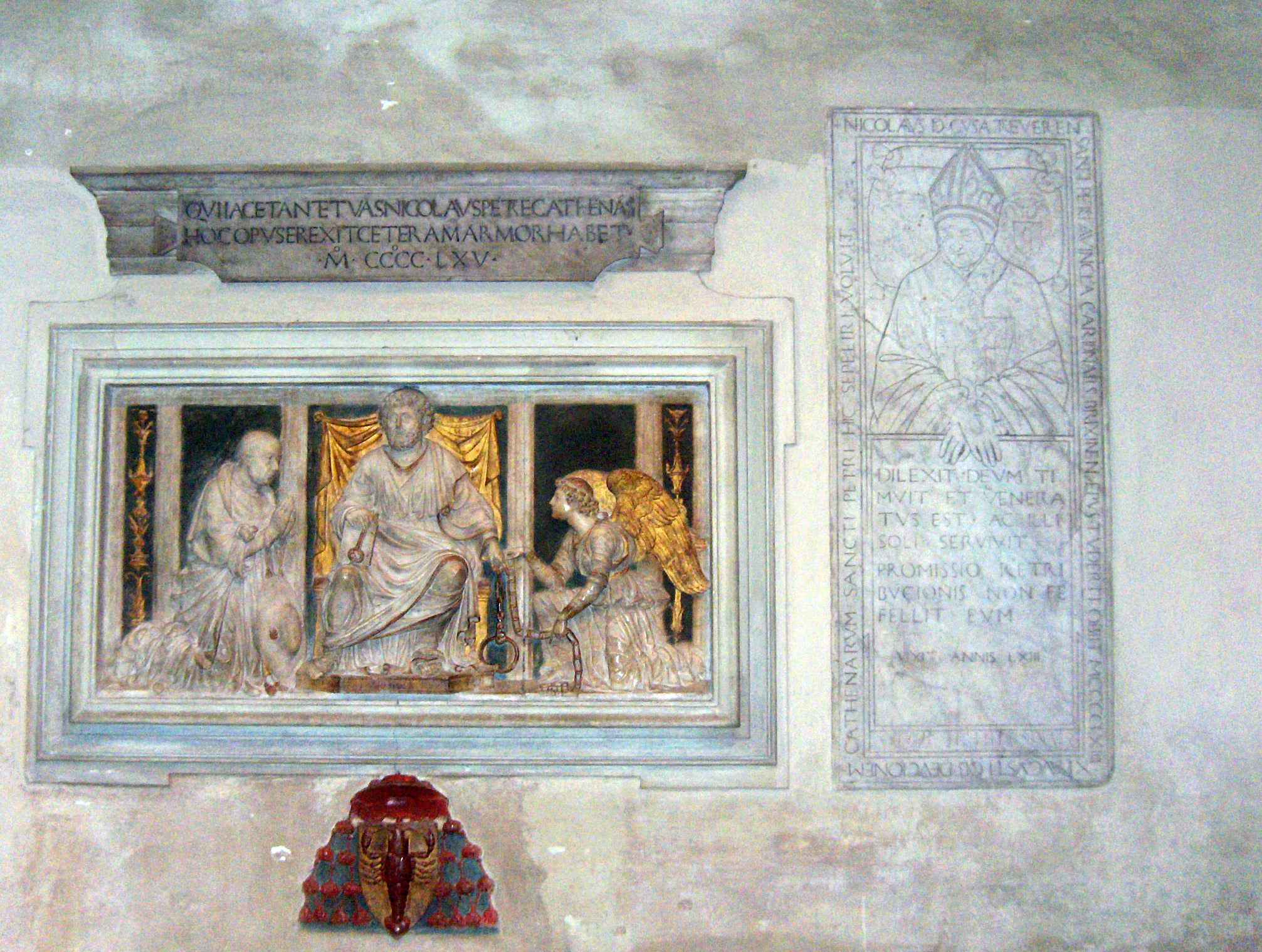
Tomb in San Pietro in Vincoli, Rome, with the relief "Cardinal Nicholas before St Peter" by Andrea Bregno

Upon his death, Nicholas's body was interred in the church of San Pietro in Vincoli in Rome, probably near the relic of Peter's chains; but it was later lost. His monument, with a sculpted image of the cardinal, remains. Two other tombstones, one medieval and one modern, also are found in the church. In accordance with his wishes, his heart rests within the chapel altar at the Cusanusstift in Kues. To this charitable institution that he had founded he bequeathed his entire inheritance; it still stands, and serves the purpose Nicholas intended for it, as a home for the aged. The Cusanusstift also houses many of his manuscripts.

The Cusanus crater on the Moon was named after him.

== Philosophy ==
Nicholas's De Docta Ignorantia ('Of Learned Ignorance') is an epistemological and metaphysical treatise. He maintains the finite human mind cannot fully know the divine, infinite mind ('the Maximum'). Nonetheless, he holds that the human intellect can become aware of its limitations in knowing God and thus attain "learned ignorance". His theory shows the influence of neoplatonism and negative theology, and he frequently cites Pseudo-Dionysius the Areopagite.

Nicholas was noted for his deeply mystical writings about Christianity. He wrote of the enfolding of creation in God and their unfolding in creation. He was suspected by some of holding pantheistic beliefs, but his writings were never accused of being heretical. Nicholas also wrote in De coniecturis about using conjectures or surmises to rise to better understanding of the truth. The individual might rise above mere reason to the vision of the intellect, but the same person might fall back from such vision.

Theologically, Nicholas anticipated the implications of Reformed teaching on the harrowing of Hell (Sermon on Psalm 30:11), followed by Pico della Mirandola, who similarly explained the descensus in terms of Christ's agony.

== Science and mathematics ==
Most of Nicholas's mathematical ideas can be found in his essays, De Docta Ignorantia (Of Learned Ignorance), De Visione Dei (On the Vision of God) and De coniecturis (On Conjectures). He also wrote on squaring the circle in his mathematical treatises.

Mathematics plays a key role for Cusanus in orienting the human mind towards God. Mathematical figures provide a means for the mind to consider how figures may be deformed and transformed, and thus prepares the mind to reach the "coincidence of opposites" in the "Absolutely maximal Being".

From the Catholic Encyclopedia (1913 edition):

The astronomical views of the cardinal are scattered through his philosophical treatises. They evince complete independence of traditional doctrines, though they are based on symbolism of numbers, on combinations of letters, and on abstract speculations rather than observation. The earth is a star like other stars, is not the centre of the universe, is not at rest, nor are its poles fixed. The celestial bodies are not strictly spherical, nor are their orbits circular. The difference between theory and appearance is explained by relative motion. Had Copernicus been aware of these assertions he would probably have been encouraged by them to publish his own monumental work.

Like Nicole Oresme, Nicholas also wrote about the possibility of the plurality of worlds.

Norman Moore tells us in The Fitz-Patrick Lectures of 1905:

In medicine he introduced an improvement which in an altered form has continued in use to this day. This improvement was the counting of the pulse which up to his time had been felt and discussed in many ways but never counted. ...Nicholas of Cusa proposed to compare the rate of pulses by weighing the quantity of water run out of a water clock while the pulse beat one hundred times. ...The manufacture of watches with second-hands has since given us a simpler method of counting, but the merit of introducing this useful kind of observation into clinical medicine belongs to Nicholas of Cusa.

== Politics ==
In 1433, Nicholas proposed reform of the Holy Roman Empire and a method to elect Holy Roman Emperors. Although it was not adopted by the Church, his method was essentially the same one known today as the Borda count, which is used in many academic institutions, competitions, and even some political jurisdictions, in original form and a number of variations. His proposal preceded Borda's work by over three centuries.

Nicholas's opinions on the Empire, which he hoped to reform and strengthen, were cited against papal claims of temporal power in the sixteenth and seventeenth centuries. Protestant writers were happy to cite a cardinal against Rome's assertions. Protestants, however, found his writings against the Hussites wrong. Nicholas seemed to Protestants to give the church too much power to interpret Scripture, instead of treating it as self-interpreting and self-sufficient for salvation, the principle of sola scriptura.

Nicholas's own thought on the church changed with his departure from Basel. He tried arguing that the Basel assembly lacked the consent of the church throughout the world, especially the princes. Then he tried arguing that the church was unfolded from Peter (explicatio Petri). This allowed him to support the pope without abandoning ideas of reform. Thus, he was able to propose to Pius II reform of the church, beginning with the pope himself. Then it was to spread through the Roman curia and outward throughout Christendom.

Nicholas noted that government was founded on the consent of the governed:

Accordingly, since by nature all men are free, any authority by which subjects are prevented from doing evil and their freedom is restrained to doing good through fear from penalties, comes solely from harmony and from the consent of the subjects, whether the authority reside in written law or in the living law which is in the ruler. For if by nature men are equally strong and equally free, the true and settled power of one over the others, the ruler having equal natural power, could be set up only by the choice and consent of the others, just as a law also is set up by consent.

== Other religions ==
Shortly after the Fall of Constantinople in 1453, Nicholas wrote De pace fidei, On the Peace of Faith. This visionary work imagined a summit meeting in Heaven of representatives of all nations and religions. Islam and the Hussite movement in Bohemia are represented. The conference agrees that there can be una religio in varietate rituum, a single faith manifested in different rites, as manifested in the eastern and western rites of the Catholic Church. The dialogue presupposes the greater accuracy of Christianity but gives respect to other religions. Nicholas's position was for Europeans not to retake Constantinople but simply to trade with the Ottomans and allow them their conquests. Less irenic but not virulent, is his Cribratio Alchorani, Sifting the Koran, a detailed review of the Koran in Latin translation. While the arguments for the superiority of Christianity are still shown in this book, it also credits Judaism and Islam with sharing in the truth at least partially.

== Influence ==
Nicholas was widely read, and his works were published in the sixteenth century in both Paris and Basel. Sixteenth-century French scholars, including Jacques Lefèvre d'Étaples and Charles de Bovelles, cited him. Lefèvre even edited the Paris 1514 Opera. Nonetheless, there was no Cusan school, and his works were largely unknown until the nineteenth century, though Giordano Bruno quoted him, while some thinkers, like Gottfried Leibniz, were thought to have been influenced by him. Neo-Kantian scholars began studying Nicholas in the nineteenth century, and new editions were begun by the Heidelberger Akademie der Wissenschaften in the 1930s and published by Felix Meiner Verlag. In the early twentieth century, he was hailed by Ernst Cassirer as the "first modern thinker," and much debate since then has centered around the question whether he should be seen as essentially a medieval or Renaissance figure. What is more, Cassirer presented Cusanus as the main focal point (einfachen Brennpunkt) of Italian Renaissance philosophy. Eminent scholars like Eugenio Garin and Paul Oskar Kristeller challenged Cassirer’s thesis, and went so far as to practically deny any considerable link between Nicholas of Cusa and Marsilio Ficino or Giovanni Pico. In the following decades, new hypotheses on the relationship between Cusanus and Italian humanists appeared, more balanced and focused on the sources.

Societies and centers dedicated to Nicholas can be found in Argentina, Japan, Germany, Italy and the United States. His well-known quote about the infinity of the universe is found paraphrased in the Central Holy Book of the Thelemites, The Book of the Law, which was "received" from the Angel Aiwass by Aleister Crowley in Cairo in April 1904: "In the sphere I am everywhere the centre, as she, the circumference, is nowhere found."

== Works ==
Nicholas wrote a large number of works, which include:

- De auctoritate praesidendi in concilio generali (1434), a proposal for resolving the question of presidency over the deliberations of the Council of Basil.
- De concordantia catholica (The Catholic Concordance) (1434), a synthesis of ideas on church and empire balancing hierarchy with consent.
- Reparatio kalendarii (1434/5), a plan for reforming the church's calendar.
- De Docta ignorantia (On Learned Ignorance) (1440).
- De coniecturis (On Conjectures) (1441-2)
- Dialogus concludens Amedistarum errorem (1441), an ecclesiological explanation of his papal advocacy.
- De Deo abscondito (On the Hidden God) (1444/5)
- De quaerendo Deum (On Seeking God) (1445)
- De date patris luminum (On the Gift of the Father of Lights (1445/6)
- De transmutationibus geometricis
- De arithmetricis complementis (1445)
- De filiatione Dei (On Divine Sonship)
- De genesi (On Genesis)
- Apologia doctae ignorantiae (The Defense of Learned Ignorance) (1449), a response to charges of heresy and pantheism by the Heidelberg scholastic theologian John Wenck in a work entitled De ignota litteratura (On Unknown Learning).
- Idiota de mente (The Layman on Mind) (1450). This is formed of four dialogues: De Sapientia I-II, De Mente III, and De staticis experimentis IV.
- De visione Dei (On the Vision of God) (1453), completed at the request of the monks of the Benedictine abbey at Tegernsee.
- De pace fidei (1453), written in response to the news of the fall of Constantinople to the Turks.
- De theologicis complementis, in which he pursued his continuing fascination with theological applications of mathematical models.
- De mathematicis complementis (1453)
- Caesarea circuli quadratura (1457)
- Excitationum ex sermonibus (1457)
- De beryllo (On the Beryl) (1458), a brief epistemological treatise using a beryl or transparent stone as the crucial analogy.
- De aequalitate (1459)
- De principio (1459)
- Reformatio generalis, (1459) a treatise on the general reform of the church, written at the request of Pope Pius II, but generally ignored by the Pope and cardinals.
- De possest (1460)
- Cribratio Alkorani , a Christocentric evaluation of the Koran written at the request of Pope Pius II, based on the twelfth-century translation of Robert of Ketton.
- De non aliud (On the Not-Other) (1462)
- De venatione sapientiae (1462)
- De ludo globi (1463)
- Compendium (1463)
- De apice theoriae (On the Summit of Contemplation) (1464), his last work.

=== Modern editions ===
- Opera omnia, ed. E Hoffmann et al., (Hamburg: Felix Meiner, 1932–2006) [The modern critical edition, begun under the editorship of Ernst Hoffmann and Raymond Klibansky]
- Acta Cusana, ed Erich Muethen and Hermann Hallauer, (1976–) [A series designed to publish all extant documents, letters, deeds and other materials in which Cusanus and his activities are mentioned]
- On Learned Ignorance, tr. Jasper Hopkins, (Minneapolis, MN: Banning, 1985)
- Jasper Hopkins, Nicholas of Cusa's Dialectical Mysticism: Text, Translation, and Interpretive Study of De Visione Dei , (Minneapolis, MN: Banning, 1985)
- Dialectical Mysticism, tr. Jasper Hopkins, (Minneapolis, MN: Banning, 1988)
- De auctoritate praesidendi in concilio generali, tr. HL Bond et al., Church History 59, (1990), 19-34
- De concordantia catholica (The Catholic Concordance), tr. P Sigmund, Cambridge Texts in the History of Political Thought, (Cambridge: CUP, 1991)
- A Miscellany on Nicholas of Cusa, tr. Jasper Hopkins, (Minneapolis, MN: Banning, 1994)
- On Wisdom and Knowledge, tr. Jasper Hopkins, (Minneapolis, MN: Banning, 1996)
- Metaphysical Speculations, tr. Jasper Hopkins, 2 vols, (Minneapolis, MN: Banning, 1997–2000) [Contains translations of: Vol 1: De apice theoriae; Vol 2: De Coniecturis and De Ludo Globi]
- Bond, H. Lawrence (ed.), Nicholas of Cusa: Selected Spiritual Writings, Classics of Western Spirituality, (New York: Paulist Press, 1997). ISBN 0-8091-3698-8 [Contains translations of On Learned Ignorance, Dialogue on the Hidden God, On Seeking God, On the Vision of God, and On the Summit of Contemplation.]
- Hopkins, Jasper (ed.), Complete philosophical and theological treatises of Nicholas of Cusa, 2 vols., (Minneapolis: AJ Banning Press, 2001)
- Izbicki, Thomas M., ed., Nicholas of Cusa, Writings on Church and Reform, (Cambridge, MA: Harvard University Press, 2008).

== See also ==
- Ground of the Soul
- List of Roman Catholic scientist-clerics
- Absolute (philosophy)
- I know that I know nothing
- Berthold of Moosburg, an estimator of his comment on the Elementatio Theologica of Proclus

Catholic Church titles
| Preceded by Johann Röttel | Bishop of Brixen; 1450–1464 | Succeeded by Georg Golser |
