= True Scotsman =

State of not wearing undergarments under kilts

1815 cartoon of Parisian women sneakily looking at Scottish soldiers

"True Scotsman" is a humorous term used in Scotland for a man wearing a kilt without undergarments. Though the tradition as a whole has debated origins, it has entered Scottish lore as a rite, an expression of light-hearted curiosity about the custom, and even as a subversive gesture.

However, the notion that no undergarments is the only "true" or culturally authentic way to wear a kilt is a myth. Historically, evidence is scare prior to the early 19th century, and there are some practical situations that would make doing so inadvisable, such as cold temperatures, biting insects, and physical activity that could expose oneself to onlookers.

== Origin ==
The earliest form of the kilt, called a plaid or "great kilt" (feileadh mòr), first appears in artwork the early 1600s and was worn over the existing garments of the time, such as trews, or breeches with hose or leg wraps. Starting in the late 1600s, historical paintings start to show some kilts worn with high socks, with no covering on the visible part of the upper legs. One native Scottish author during this time writes of how highlanders traveling on foot would wear the great kilt without breeches or trews because it was lighter and easier. During this early time period, a great kilt was considered outerwear and sometimes needed to be removed to change its usage, making the idea of wearing one without any coverage underneath unlikely, though it is theorized that they might have been worn over a long shirt that reached the knees.

In the 1720's, English author Edmund Burt observed Highlanders wearing the kilt so short that the "indecency of it" was exposed during high winds or physical labor, though it is unclear if he referred to nudity or visible underwear.

According to Dr. Nick Fiddes, Highland regiments of the 18th century wore the later "small kilt" (filleadh beag) without undergarments both to aid in mobility and comfort, but also as a display of masculinity. This became the origin of calling wearing a kilt without underwear "to go regimental." However, he states that it is uncertain how common this was outside of the military among the general populace, as there are accounts of underwear and "kilt liners" being worn underneath at various points. The earliest visual reference to the practice is a series of satirical French illustrations in 1815 when Paris was occupied after the Battle of Waterloo by a Scottish regiment. Parisians are depicted being curious about the potential absence of undergarments and attempting to surreptitiously get a look underneath the soldiers' kilts.

== 20th century military practice ==
The kilt continued to be part of some regimental combat uniforms on the Western Front during the First World War: Every day (as part of inspection) the regiment would be inspected by a senior officer who would have a mirror to look under kilts. Anyone found wearing underpants would be sent back to take them off. However, in 1940 the kilt was retired from combat because of the vulnerability of bare skin to chemical agents, although it was retained as the formal dress uniform of the regiments. The practice of not wearing undergarments led to an incident in 1997, when windy conditions during a military ceremony in Hong Kong caused a Black Watch soldier to be exposed in front of the press.

== Modern times ==
The decision to wear or not wear underwear with a kilt is considered a matter of personal preference, but may be restricted by policies as well as practical consideration. For example, most kilt rentals require underwear to be worn for hygienic reasons. As of 2008, Highland dancers and athletes have been bound by the nature of their competitions to appropriately and modestly clothe themselves. In Highland Dance competitions and exhibitions, the regulations of the Scottish Official Board of Highland Dancing (SOBHD) have stated regarding underwear: "Dark or toning with the kilt should be worn, but not white." In 2010, the Director of the Scottish Tartans Authority, Brian Wilton, described the tradition of not wearing undergarments as "childish and unhygienic". In response, racing driver David Coulthard and some kilt manufacturers spoke in favour of the tradition, while MSP Jamie McGrigor and Wimbledon champion Andy Murray admitted to wearing underpants under their kilts.

The popularity of the stereotype of going "true Scotsman" has also lead to men in kilts being questioned about it inappropriately or sexually harassed. In 2015, the Scottish barmen of Hootananny pub in Inverness abandoned kilts because customers sexually assaulted them by lifting their kilts repeatedly. Ian Howie, the pub's assistant manager, said: "You get large groups of drinking women circling around when you are collecting glasses and asking whether you are true Scotsman – and they find out for themselves. Mainly hen nights." Kilts were initially chosen to give the venue a more authentic feel, but the harassment lead to Tartan shorts being worn instead.

== In popular culture ==
- In 1968, the Scottish group, Marmalade (band), made an appearance on Top Of The Pops due to their #1 hit, Ob-La-Di, Ob-La-Da. In celebration of becoming the first Scottish group to top the UK charts according to Guinness World Records, the Scottish members performed in kilts, whilst their sole British member, modeled a red jacket. Alan Whitehead (drummer) posted about the experience on his official Facebook page, stating that during their performance, they wore nothing underneath: "In 1968 we had the best Christmas present... a number one hit record. The group promised to wear kilts if ever they got to number one... except me of course being English. The group spent all day in their kilts and like true Scotsmen had nothing on underneath...(and) during the final rehearsal the group thought it would be fun to do the Can-can... Remember, the show went out live in those days. The producer was horrified to think of the Marmalade’s block and tackle seen by 20 million viewers, so when we came to perform as we rushed onto the set I noticed all the cameras had little stickers on them saying: "When Marmalade are performing shoot waist up only"...true story"
- While portraying Jamie Fraser in the television franchise Outlander, actor Sam Heughan reportedly did not wear underwear beneath his kilts.
- It has been suggested that the 2012 animated film Brave was given a PG rating by American film censors because it showed male characters lifting their kilts. One character was shown lifting his kilt and crying, "Feast your eyes!"
- In the 1995 film Braveheart, during the Battle of Stirling Bridge scene, the Scottish soldiers lift their kilts to flash the English archers, taunting them after an attack. It has been noted that the historical Scottish during the time period depicted in the film wouldn't have worn kilts at all.
- In the 1927 film Putting Pants on Philip, Stan Laurel, playing a young kilted Scotsman new to the United States, loses his underwear and walks over a subway grate. His kilt is blown up, revealing his nudity and causing two women to faint.

== See also ==
- Going commando
- No True Scotsman
- Caledonian Antisyzygy
