= Henry Graham Gregory-Smith =

British colonial administrator

Major Henry Graham Gregory-Smith (3 March 1899 – ) was a British colonial administrator from Edinburgh. After serving in the colonial administration in Kenya for two decades, Gregory-Smith served as Resident Commissioner of the Solomon Islands from 1950 to 1953.

During his tenure in the Solomon Islands, he was tasked with bringing about a rapprochement with the Maasina Rule movement.

He was the son of Scottish literary critic George Gregory Smith.
