= De ludo globi =

1463 book by Nicolaas van Cusa

De ludo globi (English: The Game of Spheres, The Ball Game, or The Globe Game) is a book by 15th century philosopher, theologian, and cardinal Nicholas Cusanus.

The text was written in Rome and completed in October 1463. It consists of two dialogues, the first between Cusanus and John IV, Duke of Bavaria and the second between Cusanus and John's brother Albert IV, Duke of Bavaria.

== First Dialogue ==
This dialogue starts with Cusanus resting after having played a newly invented ball game. "No honest game is entirely lacking in the capacity to instruct," observes Cusanus. Having compared the motion of the misbalanced ball used in the game to the soul of man, set in motion by God, he moves on to discuss a game he had been toying with:

I thought to invent a game of knowledge, I considered how it should be done. Next I defined it, making it as you see.
