= Androgynos (mythology) =

Primordial being in comparative mythology

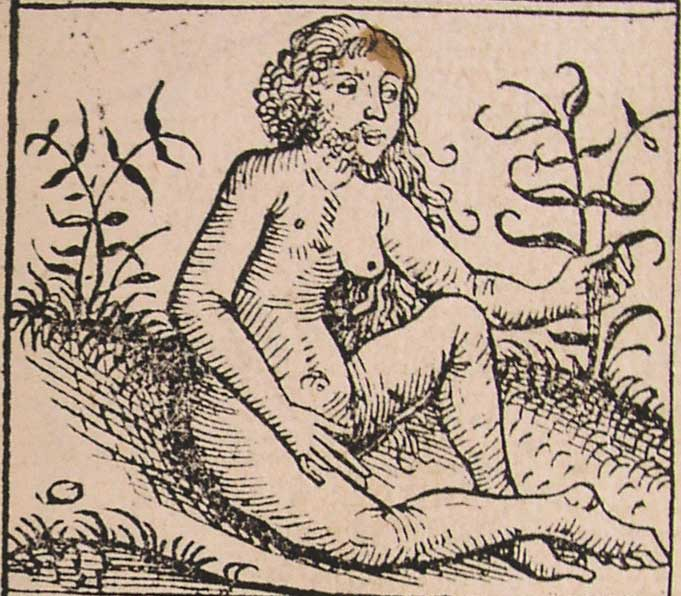
Illustration of an androgynous person in the Nuremberg Chronicles

Androgynos (Ancient Greek: ἀνδρόγυνος, romanized: andrógynos; plural ἀνδρόγῠνοι, andrógynoi) is an expression in ancient Greek that is significant in literary mythology. The word is composed of ἀνήρ (anḗr, 'man') and γυνή (gynḗ, 'woman').

Originally the term only described "effeminate" feminized men, such as the Scythian fortune teller in Herodotus's Histories. Plato was the first to use the word for another meaning: in his usage, androgynoi were mythical beings who were androgynous, meaning they had both masculine and feminine sex characteristics.

== Plato's myth ==
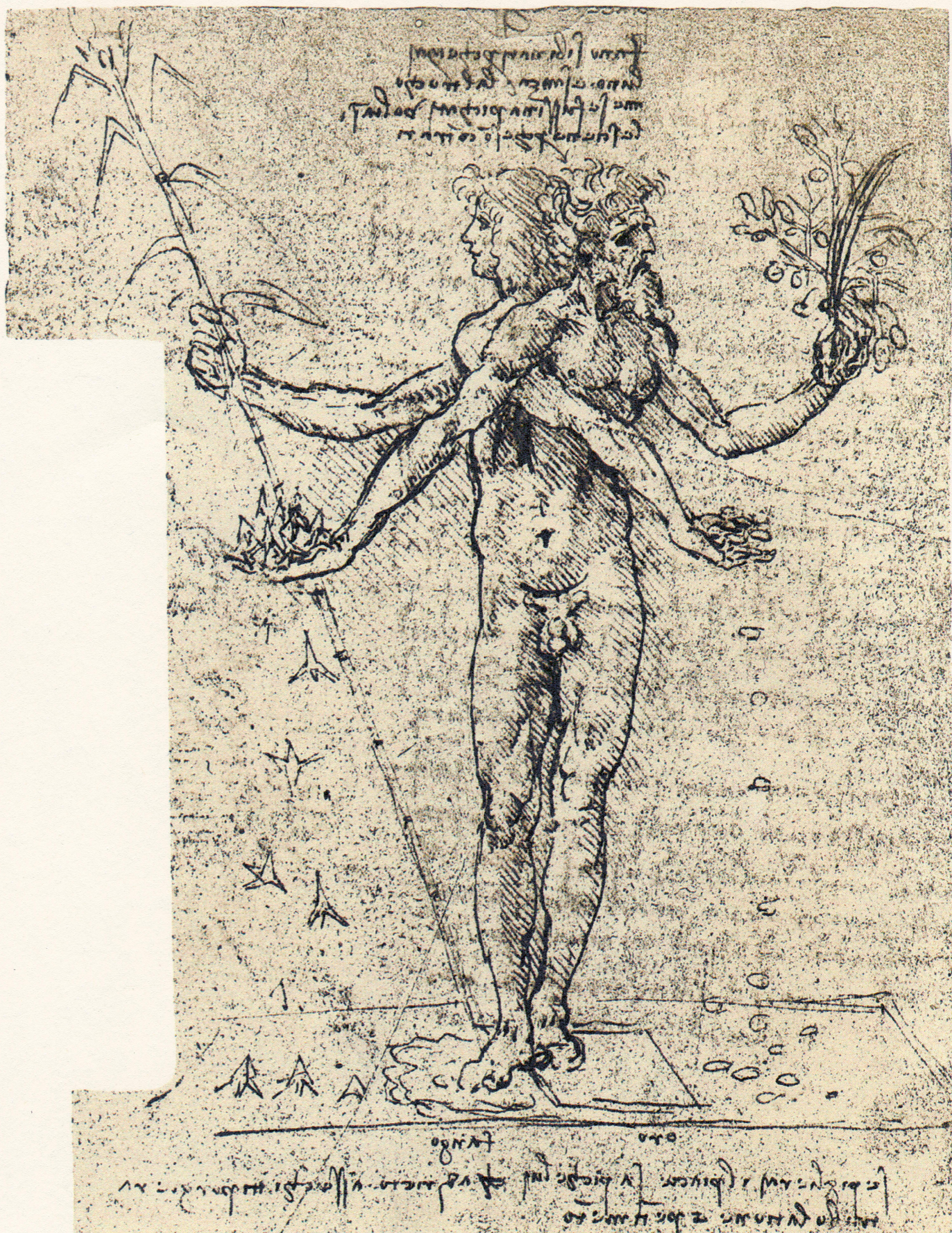
Leonardo da Vinci: androgynous body with two heads

The term originated in ancient times through Plato's Symposium, a fictional work which depicts a banquet where several orators gave speeches or presentations about eroticism. It is during a speech by Aristophanes that the myth of the Ball-people was told, and it was in this story with the first known usage of the word Androgynos in the sense of androgyny. Plato created the myth himself, and used old mythical motifs in the story. The core of the story can also be found in mythologies outside of European ones. The legend posits a mythical origin to the phenomenon of erotic desire.

In the story, there were three sexes; man, woman, and the union of the two. All of these forms were round, had four hands, four feet, and two faces on one head. These beings were said to possess immense strength, and in their hubris they wanted to storm the heavens. The gods were upset but were not sure how to deal with these insurgents without losing their sacrifices. Zeus suggested that the beings be severed in two, which would double the amount of humans to give sacrifices. This was done, and the forms of the halved beings had their faces and skin rearranged, leaving a knot of skin at the navel. The two halves then began looking for each other, and were very unhappy, starving to death in each other's arms. Zeus fixed this by adjusting the sexes, allowing the couples to marry and go on happily with their lives.

In this way, the characters of people differ depending on if they come from the original man, original woman, or original man-woman. Those who came from the androgynous combination, or andrógynoi, are "lascivious and adulterous" coming from the Moon, those from the woman developed attachments best with fellow females and came from the Earth, and those from the man connected with other men, hailing from the Sun. Each pair is inseparable and live most harmoniously when together, and if they were approached by Hephaestus and offered to be melted together, the pair would admit this was the exact expression of their desires.

For love is the desire of the whole, and the pursuit of the whole is called love.

— Plato, Symposium, Aristophanes' speech

Plato provides the myth of these Ball-people to explain the differences between sexual orientations. Only people who came from the andrógynoi are heterosexually inclined.

Plato's Aristophanes is himself homosexual, and expresses his gratitude for the male Ball-people, and the homoerotic people who emerged from them. He remarks that infidels and cheats come most commonly from the andrógynoi, claiming that their sexual behaviors are addictive and they have an inherent lack of loyalty. He also mentions that in his time, androgynos is only used as an insult, meaning "effeminate man," or "coward."

== Reception of the myth ==
Jewish interpreters of the creation myth portrayed in the Book of Genesis, wherein God created men and women separately, perceived an analogy between Plato's Androgynos and Adam, the first human created by God. Under this interpretation, Adam was similar to the Androgynos before his rib was detached to create Eve, the first woman, thereby creating masculine and feminine natures.

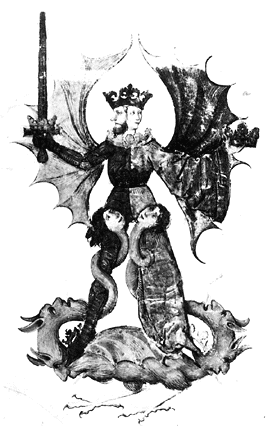
15th-century alchemy's androgyne, Rebis of Bavarian State Library

Eusebius maintained that Plato had taken the biblical creation story as inspiration for his myth, but this was a misunderstanding.

During the Renaissance, a new interpretation of the myth became popular. The influential humanist Marsilio Ficino published Theologia Platonica de immortalitate animae (Platonic Theology), which consisted of his Latin translation of Plato's Symposium along with De amore, which was a commentary dialogue to accompany the text. There were also versions with the title El libro dell'amore distributed. This was the first time that Plato's Androgynos myth was in the public eye of middle and western Europe since the end of antiquity. Ficino's interpretation avoided the expression androgyn and posited that the three genders in Aristophanes's speech were more allegorical.

Through this depiction, they were seen rather as symbols for three predisposed types of souls, and the "mixed" (man-woman) souls were attributed to the virtue of divine justice, which strayed away from a more physical depiction of sex that would have been offensive for the time. In addition, he depicted the separation of the Ball-people as the separation of the apostate soul from the divine realm. He linked this idea to the Christian story of the Fall of Man, where the consumption of the apple by Eve inextricably severed the human soul from its heavenly half, and since this point all souls were no longer imbued with divine light, they simply consisted of the natural parts which remained. However, through Eros (Amor), unity could be recovered, and the soul could regain the perfection it once held. Through neutralizing the sexual connotations, Ficino adapted the text of Plato's Symposium to suit the contemporary behavioral norms that had developed in Christianity. This was accepted as an interpretation of the androgyny motif within Christianity.

During the first half of the 16th Century, the myth was regularly relevant for the literary circles surrounding the queen Marguerite de Navarra. The queen, who was herself a writer and poet, focused on the theme of yearning in her poem Les prisons, which she connected to Ficino's interpretation. Besides this she also submitted her Heptaméron, a collection of short stories which explored the search for a missing half.

Among the cultural carriers which Marguerite promoted was the poet Antoine Héroet, who published L'Androgyne de Platon in 1542, a work which was based on the foundations of Ficino's translation of the Symposium. The work was very popular – between 1542 and 1568 there were 15 editions released – and the myth became accepted into the sphere of courtly life. The frequently changing erotic relationships of the nobility found justification in the mythical background: they were trying to find their opposite halves, as when they were the androgynous Ball-people. Through this they were able to explain unavoidable errors and excuse themselves from infidelity in their partnerships.

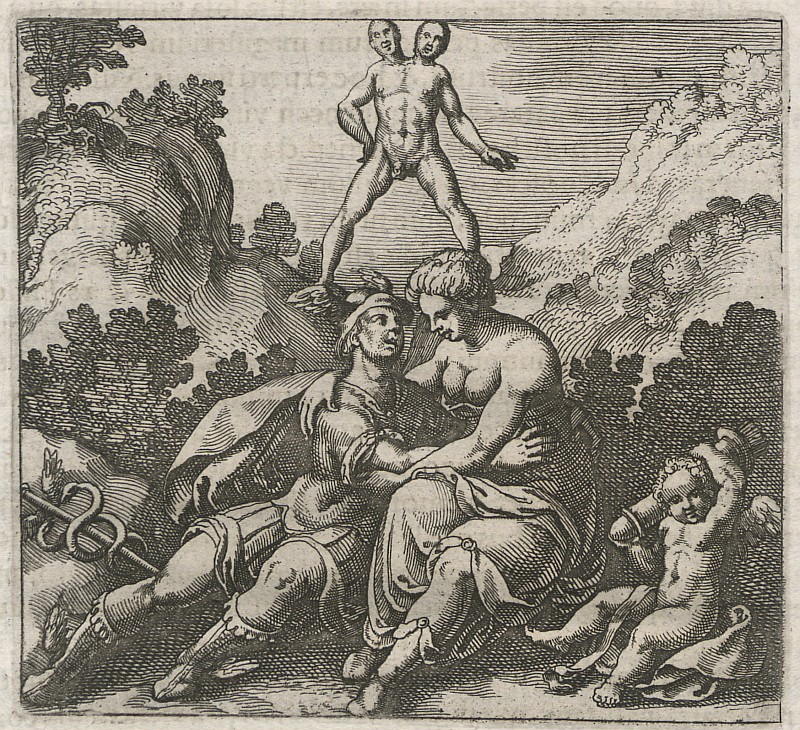
15th-century illustration from Aurora consurgens

The popularity of Héroet's poem had the effect that the word androgyne became a French noun and adjective in the vocabulary of academics, and by the middle of the 16th Century, people began to call their spouses or romantic partners their "my half." Several poets showed interest in the topic, including Bonaventure des Périers, the secretary of Queen Marguerite. In his poem Blason du nombril, appearing in 1550, he explored the fate of the Platonic Androgynoi. He found the punishment which they received to be too severe a course of action to be taken by Zeus. In the French language poetry of the 16th Century, the concept of a marriage being the union of two separated halves became the predominant view.

The Jewish philosopher Judah Leon Abravanel discussed Plato's myths in his third book, Dialoghi d'amore (Dialogue of Love), published in 1535. He tied the stories in Symposium with his interpretation of the creation of the book of Genesis. Abravanel interpreted the creation of humans "as men and women" as an expression of Adam, the primordial man in coordination with the Platonian Androgynos. Plato's attribution of the androgynous Ball-people to the moon adapted easily to the Jewish interpretation that the moon's placement is dependent on the placement of the Sun and Earth. The moon symbolized the mixing of feminine and masculine in the nature of the soul, between the "masculine intellect" from the Sun and the "feminine physicality" from the Earth. The mythical separation of the Ball-people into two halves related to the formation of Eve from Adam's rib, meaning the halving of the androgynous primordial being. The splitting of Adam in this way was interpreted as a punishment, just as in Plato's original myth: God punished the original sin of the first people, which was committed before the fall of man. The androgynous form of Adam symbolized a higher divinity and spiritual love, which only manifested in a bodily way through the creation of Eve.

In Italian Treatises of Love in the 16th Century, Androgynos out of the Platonian myth was frequently used as a talking point in argumentation. Debates about the priority of divinity in relation to bodily desire and erotic passion, as well as discussions of gender equality were popular topics for religious academics at the time. The Androgynos myth served as the illustration for an ideal of divinity, and the equal status of men and women in the noble milieu. Pietro Bembo wrote a dialogue, titled Gli Asolani, in which the incompleteness of the androgynous disintegrated Ball-person necessitated the natural expression of the erotic, and therefore contradicts the notion that love is a principle of suffering.

== Literature ==
- Achim Aurnhammer: Androgynie. Studien zu einem Motiv in der europäischen Literatur (= Literatur und Leben, Neue Folge, Band 30). Böhlau, Cologne/Vienna 1986, ISBN 978-3-412-01286-1
- Mário Jorge de Carvalho: Die Aristophanesrede in Platons Symposium. Die Verfassung des Selbst. Königshausen & Neumann, Würzburg 2009, ISBN 978-3-8260-3782-5
- Robert Valentine Merrill, Robert J. Clements: Platonism in French Renaissance Poetry. New York University Press, New York 1957, S. 99–117

== See also ==
- Hermaphroditus
