= De Docta Ignorantia =

1440 text by Nicholas of Cusa

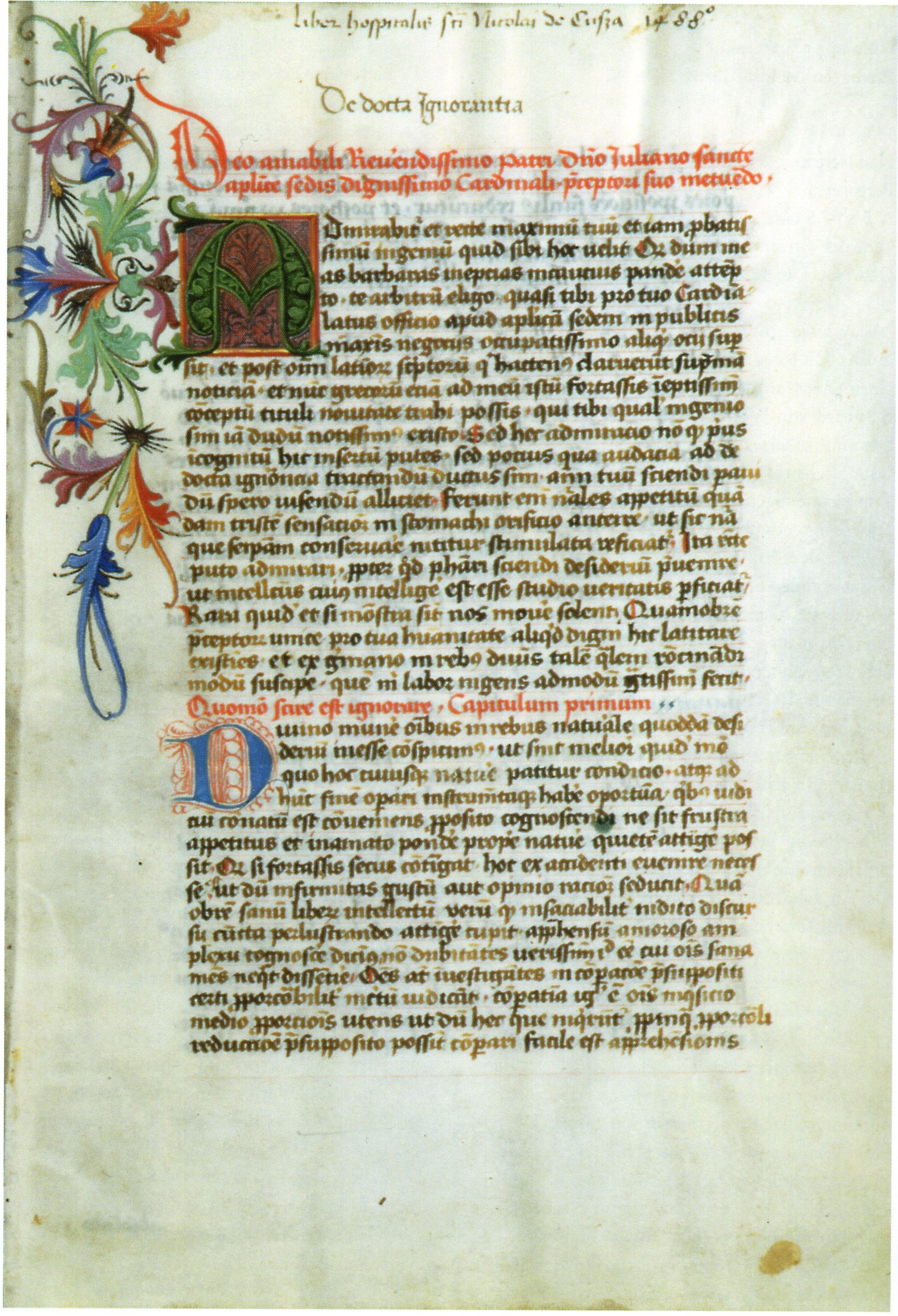
De Docta Ignorantia

De docta ignorantia (Latin: On learned ignorance/on scientific ignorance) is a book on philosophy and theology by Nicholas of Cusa (or Nicolaus Cusanus), who finished writing it on 12 February 1440 in his hometown of Kues, Germany.

Earlier scholars had discussed the question of "learned ignorance". Augustine of Hippo, for instance, stated "Est ergo in nobis quaedam, ut dicam, docta ignorantia, sed docta spiritu dei, qui adiuvat infirmitatem nostram" ["There is therefore in us a certain learned ignorance, so to speak — an ignorance which we learn from that Spirit of God who helps our infirmities"]; here he explains the working of the Holy Spirit among men and women, despite their human insufficiency, as a learned ignorance. The Christian writer Pseudo-Dionysius the Areopagite advises his reader to ἀγνώστως ἀνατάθητι, to "strive upwards unknowingly". Bonaventura of Bagnoregio declared "spiritus noster non-solum efficitur agilis ad ascensum verum etiam quadam ignorantia docta supra se ipsum rapitur in caliginem et excessum" ["we are lifted into divine knowing without directly striving for it"].

For Cusanus, docta ignorantia means that since mankind can not grasp the infinity of the deity through rational knowledge, the limits of science need to be passed by means of speculation. This mode of inquiry blurs the borders between science and ignorantia. In other words, both reason and a supra-rational understanding are needed to understand God. This leads to the coincidentia oppositorum, a union of opposites, a doctrine common in mystic beliefs from the Middle Ages. These ideas influenced other Renaissance scholars in Cusanus' day, such as Marsilio Ficino and Pico della Mirandola.
