= Syzygy =

Syzygy may refer to:

== Science ==
- Syzygy (astronomy), a collinear configuration of three celestial bodies
- Syzygy (mathematics), linear relation between generators of a module
- Syzygy, in biology, the pairing of chromosomes during meiosis

== Philosophy ==
- Syzygy, a concept in the philosophy of Vladimir Solovyov denoting "close union"
- Syzygy, a term used by Carl Jung to mean a union of opposites, e.g. anima and animus
- Syzygy, female–male pairings of the emanations known as Aeon (Gnosticism)

== Literature ==
- Epirrhematic syzygy, a system of symmetrically corresponding verse forms in Greek Old Comedy
- "It Wasn't Syzygy", a short story by Theodore Sturgeon
- Syzygy, a novel by Michael G. Coney
- Syzygy (novel), by Frederik Pohl
- Syzygy (poetry), the combination of two metrical feet into a single unit
- Syzygy Darklock, a fictional character in the comic book series Dreadstar
- Syzygy Publishing, an American comics publisher founded by Chris Ryall and Ashley Wood

== Film, television, and games ==
- Syzygy endgame tablebases, used by chess engines
- Atari, Inc., the successor to the Syzygy Co.
- "Syzygy" (The X-Files), a 1996 episode of the science fiction series
- Syzygy, a robot character from the video game Unreal Tournament 2003
- Syzygy, a game for the Dragon 32 home computer, published by Microdeal
- Syzygy, a linking word game by Lewis Carroll, published in The Lady magazine
- Syzygy, a Great Old One in the game Eldritch Horror (board game), introduced in the expansion Strange Remnants
- Syzygy Co., an arcade game engineering company co-founded by Nolan Bushnell
- SYZYGY, the title of Chapter 4 of Part 2 of the Netflix series The OA

== Music ==
=== Albums ===
- Syzygy (EP), 1998, by Lynch Mob
- Syzygy (LP), 2013, by Lucrecia Dalt
- Syzygy (LP), 2015, by Blaue Blume

=== Songs ===
- "Syzygy", a track from the 1987 album Michael Brecker
- "Syzygy", a track by Gene Loves Jezebel on the 1990 album Kiss of Life
- "Syzygy, Part I", "Syzygy, Part II", and "Syzygy, Part III", tracks from the 2004 album Suns of the Tundra
- "Syzygy", a track by Los Angeles Guitar Quartet on the 2012 LAGQ: Latin album
- "Syzygy", a track by Mickey Factz on the 2015 mixtape "Y3"
- "Syzygy", a track by Laurel Halo on the 2017 album Dust
- "Syzygy", a track by Jazzuelle (ft. Simeon) from the 2020 Album Rogue

=== Other uses in music ===
- Syzygy, an alternative electronica music duo featuring Dominic Glynn
- Syzygy, composition by Del Tredici
- Syzygys (band), a Japanese band

== See also ==
- Caledonian Antisyzygy, a term referring to the Scottish psyche and literature
- Szyzyg, the YouTube username of Scott Manley
