= Classics of Western Spirituality =

Book series published by Paulist Press

Classics of Western Spirituality [CWS] is an English-language book series published by Paulist Press since 1978, which offers a library of historical texts on Christian spirituality as well as a representative selection of works on Jewish, Islamic, Sufi and Native American spirituality. Each volume is selected and translated by one or more scholars or spiritual leaders, with scholarly introductions and bibliographies of both primary and secondary materials. The series contains multiple genres of spiritual writing, including poems, songs, essays, theological treatises, meditations, mystical biographies, and philosophical investigations, and features works by famous authors such as Augustine of Hippo and Martin Luther, as well as lesser-known authors such as Maximus the Confessor and Moses de León.

CWS was originally planned by an editorial board of some thirty scholars to "[foster] more enlightened spiritual direction and fruitful meditation practices", and was projected to contain sixty volumes. The series was also conceived to support scholarship in the field, which until then was hampered by lack of western language translations, introductions, notes, or other critical apparatus for its foundational texts. Today it comprises more than 130 volumes, and for ease of reference has been thematically subdivided below into pre-Reformation Christianity (57 volumes), Christianity after the Reformation (47 volumes) and Judaism, Islam and Native American religions (28 volumes).

The series was almost immediately "acclaimed as one of the most important religious publishing events of recent years." An early reviewer remarked that "the impression left by a preliminary contact with this courageous attempt to open the vast treasures of Western spiritual classics to present-day readers is one of astonished admiration. It is a triumph of editing and the printer's art." More recently, in assessing the impact of the series as a whole, one scholar concluded that CWS has been responsible "not only in making the acknowledged classics of the tradition more available, accessible, and better known but also in the process (...) expanding and deepening the canon of classics and thereby both broadening and refining the definition of 'classics' and of 'spirituality' itself."

== Pre-Reformation Christianity ==
- Albert and Thomas: Selected Writings, edited by Simon Tugwell (1988, ISBN 080913022X)
- Anchoritic Spirituality: Ancrene Wisse and Associated Works, translated by Anne Savage and Nicholas Watson (1991, ISBN 0809104490)
- Angela of Foligno: Complete Works, translated by Paul Lachance (1993, ISBN 0809104601)
- Angelic Spirituality: Medieval Perspectives on the Ways of Angels, translated by Steven L. Chase (2002, ISBN 0809139480)
- Anglo-Saxon Spirituality: Selected Writings, translated by Robert Boenig (2000, ISBN 0809139502)
- Apocalyptic Spirituality: Treatises and Letters of Lactantius, Adso of Montier-en-Der, Joachim of Fiore, the Spiritual Franciscans, Savonarola, translated by Bernard McGinn (1979, ISBN 0809122421)
- Athanasius of Alexandria: The Life of Antony and the Letter to Marcellinus, translated by Robert C. Gregg (1980, ISBN 0809122952)
- Augustine of Hippo: Selected Writings, translated by Mary T. Clark (1984, ISBN 0809125730)
- Bernard of Clairvaux: Selected Works, translated by Gillian Evans (1987, ISBN 9780809129171)
- Birgitta of Sweden: Life and Selected Writings, edited by Marguerite Tjader Harris (1990, ISBN 0809104342)
- Bonaventure: The Soul's Journey into God, The Tree of Life, The Life of St. Francis, edited by Ewert Cousins (1978, ISBN 0809121212)
- Carthusian Spirituality: The Writings of Hugh of Balma and Guigo de Ponte, translated by Dennis D. Martin (1997, ISBN 0809136643)
- Catherine of Genoa: Purgation and Purgatory, the Spiritual Dialogue, translated by Serge Hughes (1979, ISBN 0809122073)
- Catherine of Siena: The Dialogue, translated by Suzanne Noffke (1980, ISBN 0809122332)
- Celtic Spirituality, edited by Oliver Davies (1999, ISBN 0809138948)
- The Cloud of Unknowing, edited by James Walsh (1981, ISBN 0809123320)
- Devotio Moderna: Basic Writings, translated by John H. Van Engen (1988, ISBN 0809129620)
- Dominican Penitent Women, edited by Maiju Lehmijoki-Gardner (2005, ISBN 0809139790)
- The Earliest Franciscans: The Legacy of Giles of Assisi, Roger of Provence, and James of Milan, edited by Paul Lachance (2015, ISBN 9780809106158)
- Early Dominicans: Selected Writings, edited by Simon Tugwell (1982, ISBN 0809124149)
- Elisabeth of Schönau: The Complete Works, translated by Anne L. Clark (2000, ISBN 0809139596)
- Ephrem the Syrian: Hymns, translated by Kathleen E. McVey (1989, ISBN 0809104296)
- Francis and Clare: The Complete Works, translated by Regis J. Armstrong and Ignatius C. Brady (1982, ISBN 0809124467)
- Francisco de Osuna: The Third Spiritual Alphabet, translated by Mary E. Giles (1981, ISBN 080912145X)
- Gertrude of Helfta: The Herald of Divine Love, edited by Margaret Winkworth (1993, ISBN 080910458X)
- Gregory of Nyssa: The Life of Moses, translated by Everett Ferguson and Abraham Malherbe (1978, ISBN 0809121123)
- Gregory Palamas: The Triads, edited by John Meyendorff (1983, ISBN 0809124475)
- Hadewijch: The Complete Works, translated by Columba Hart (1980, ISBN 0809122979)
- Henry Suso: The Exemplar, with Two German Sermons, edited by Frank Tobin (1989, ISBN 0809104075)
- Hildegard of Bingen: Scivias, translated by Columba Hart and Jane Bishop (1990, ISBN 0809104318)
- Ignatius of Loyola: The Spiritual Exercises and Selected Works, edited by George Ganss (1991, ISBN 0809132168)
- Jacopone da Todi: The Lauds, translated by Elizabeth Hughes and Serge Hughes (1982, ISBN 0809103230)
- Jean Gerson: Early Works, translated by Brian Patrick McGuire (1998, ISBN 0809104989)
- Johannes Tauler: Sermons, translated by Maria Shrady (1985, ISBN 0809126850)
- John Cassian: Conferences, translated by Colm Luibheid (1985, ISBN 080912694X)
- John Climacus: The Ladder of Divine Ascent, translated by Colm Luibheid and Norman Russell (1982, ISBN 0809123304)
- John Ruusbroec: The Spiritual Espousals and Other Works, translated by James A. Wiseman (1985, ISBN 0809127296)
- Julian of Norwich: Showings, translated by Edmund Colledge and James Walsh (1978, ISBN 0809120917)
- Late Medieval Mysticism of the Low Countries, edited by Rik Van Nieuwenhove, Robert Faesen, and Helen Rolfson (2008, ISBN 9780809105694)
- Margaret Ebner: Major Works, edited by Leonard P. Hindsley (1993, ISBN 0809104628)
- Marguerite Porete: The Mirror of Simple Souls, translated by Ellen Babinsky (1993, ISBN 0809104644)
- Maximus the Confessor: Selected Writings, translated by George C. Berthold (1985, ISBN 0809126591)
- Mechthild of Hackeborn: The Book of Special Grace, translated by Barbara Newman (2017, ISBN 080910637X)
- Mechthild of Magdeburg: The Flowing Light of the Godhead, translated by Frank Tobin (1998, ISBN 0809137763)
- Meister Eckhart: The Essential Sermons, Commentaries, Treatises, and Defense, translated by Edmund Colledge (1981, ISBN 0809123703)
- Meister Eckhart: Teacher and Preacher, edited by Bernard McGinn (1986, ISBN 0809128276)
- Nicholas of Cusa: Selected Spiritual Writings, translated by H. Lawrence Bond (1997, ISBN 0809136988)
- Norbert and Early Norbertine Spirituality compiled by Theodore J. Antry and Carol Neel (2007, ISBN 9780809144686)
- Origen: An Exhortation to Martyrdom, Prayer and Selected Works, translated by Rowan A. Greer (1979, ISBN 0809121980)
- Pseudo-Dionysius: The Complete Works, translated by Colm Luibheid (1987, ISBN 0809128381)
- Pseudo-Macarius: The Fifty Spiritual Homilies and the Great Letter, edited by George A. Maloney (1992, ISBN 0809104555)
- The Pursuit of Wisdom and Other Works, by the Author of The Cloud of Unknowing, edited by James Walsh (1988, ISBN 0809129728)
- Richard of St. Victor: The Twelve Patriarchs, The Mystical Ark, Book Three of the Trinity, translated by Grover A. Zinn (1979, ISBN 0809121220)
- Richard Rolle: The English Writings, edited by Rosamund S. Allen (1988, ISBN 0809130084)
- Symeon the New Theologian: The Discourses, translated by C. J. de Catanzaro (1980, ISBN 0809122308)
- The Venerable Bede: On the Song of Songs and Selected Writings, edited by Arthur G. Holder (2011, ISBN 9780809147007)
- Walter Hilton: The Scale of Perfection, translated by John P. H. Clark and Rosemary Dorward (1991, ISBN 0809104407)

== Post-Reformation Christianity ==
- Alphonsus de Liguori: Selected Writings, edited by Fredrick M. Jones (1999, ISBN 0809137712)
- Angelus Silesius: The Cherubinic Wanderer, translated by Maria Shrady (1986, ISBN 0809127687)
- Bérulle and the French School: Selected Writings, edited by William M. Thompson (1989, ISBN 0809104261)
- Cambridge Platonist Spirituality, edited by Charles Taliaferro and Alison J. Teply (2004, ISBN 080910539X)
- Early Anabaptist Spirituality: Selected Writings, edited by Daniel Liechty (1994, ISBN 0809104660)
- Early Protestant Spirituality, edited by Scott H. Hendrix (2009, ISBN 9780809142118)
- Edith Stein: Selected Writings, edited by Marian Maskulak (2016, ISBN 9780809106332)
- Élisabeth Leseur: Selected Writings, edited by Janet Ruffing (2005, ISBN 0809143291)
- Emanuel Swedenborg: The Universal Human and Soul-Body Interaction, edited by George F. Dole (1984, ISBN 0809125544)
- The Emergence of Evangelical Spirituality: The Age of Edwards, Newton, and Whitefield, edited by Tom Schwanda (2016, ISBN 9780809106219)
- Fénelon: Selected Writings, edited by Chad Helms (2006, ISBN 0809141515)
- Francis de Sales, Jane de Chantal: Letters of Spiritual Devotion, translated by Péronne Marie Thibert (1988, ISBN 0809129906)
- George Herbert: The Country Parson and the Temple, edited by John N. Wall Jr. (1981, ISBN 0809122987)
- Jacob Boehme: The Way to Christ, edited by Peter C. Erb (1978, ISBN 0809121026)
- John Baptist de La Salle: Spirituality of Christian Education, edited by Carl Koch, Jeffrey Calligan, and Jeffrey Gros (2004, ISBN 0809141620)
- Jeanne Guyon: Selected Writings, edited by Dianne Guenin-Lelie and Ronney Mourad (2012, ISBN 9780809147182)
- Jeremy Taylor: Selected Works, edited by Thomas K. Carroll (1990, ISBN 0809104385)
- Johann Arndt: True Christianity, translated by Peter C. Erb (1979, ISBN 0809121921)
- John and Charles Wesley: Selected Writings and Hymns, edited by Frank Whaling (1981, ISBN 0809123681)
- John Calvin: Writings on Pastoral Piety, edited by Elsie Anne McKee (2001, ISBN 0809140462)
- John Comenius: The Labyrinth of the World and the Paradise of the Heart, translated by Howard Louthan and Andrea Sterk (1998, ISBN 0809137399)
- John Donne: Selections from Divine Poems, Sermons, Devotions, and Prayers, edited by John Booty (1990, ISBN 0809104350)
- John Henry Newman: Selected Sermons, edited by Ian Ker (1994, ISBN 0809104652)
- John of Avila: Audi, filia–Listen, O Daughter, translated by Joan Frances Gormley (2006, ISBN 0809142007)
- John of the Cross: Selected Writings, edited by Kieran Kavanaugh (1987, ISBN 080912839X)
- Jonathan Edwards: Spiritual Writings, edited by Kyle C. Stroebel, Adriaan C. Neele, and Kenneth P. Minkema (2019, ISBN 0809106345)
- Luis de León: The Names of Christ, translated by Manuel Durán and William Kluback (1984, ISBN 0809125617)
- Luther’s Spirituality, edited by Philip D. W. Krey and Peter D. S. Krey (2007, ISBN 9780809105144)
- Maria Maddalena de’ Pazzi: Selected Revelations, translated by Amando Maggi (2000, ISBN 0809139235)
- Miguel de Molinos: The Spiritual Guide, edited by Robert P. Baird (2010, ISBN 9780809146505)
- Nicodemos of the Holy Mountain: A Handbook of Spiritual Counsel, translated by Peter A. Chamberas (1989, ISBN 0809104199)
- Nil Sorsky: The Complete Writings, edited by George A. Maloney (2003, ISBN 0809138107)
- The Pietists: Selected Writings, edited by Peter C. Erb (1983, ISBN 0809125099)
- The Pilgrim's Tale, edited by Aleksei Pentkovsky (1999, ISBN 0809137097)
- Quaker Spirituality: Selected Writings, edited by Douglas Steere (1984, ISBN 0809125102)
- Robert Bellarmine: Spiritual Writings, edited by John P. Donnelly and Roland J. Teske (1989, ISBN 0809103893)
- Scandinavian Pietists: Spiritual Writings for 19th Century Norway, Denmark, Sweden and Finland, edited by Mark A. Granquist (2015, ISBN 0809106183)
- Schleiermacher: Christmas Dialogue, The Second Speech, and Other Selections, edited and translated by Julia A. Lamm (2015, ISBN 0809106078)
- Seventeenth-Century Lutheran Meditations and Hymns, edited by Eric Lund (2011, ISBN 9780809147298)
- The Shakers: Two Centuries of Spiritual Reflection, edited by Robley E. Whitson (1983, ISBN 0809123738)
- Sor Juana Inés de la Cruz: Selected Writings, translated by Pamela Kirk Rappaport (2005, ISBN 0809140128)
- Søren Kierkegaard: Discourses and Writings on Spirituality, translated by Christopher B. Barnett (2019, ISBN 9780809106486)
- The Spirituality of the German Awakening, edited by David Crowner and Gerald Christianson (2003, ISBN 0809141086)
- Teresa of Avila: The Interior Castle, edited by Kieran Kavanaugh (1979, ISBN 0809122545)
- Theatine Spirituality: Selected Writings, edited by William V. Hudon (1996, ISBN 0809104792)
- The Theologia Germanica of Martin Luther by Bengt Hoffman (1980, ISBN 080912291X)
- Valentin Weigel: Selected Spiritual Writings, translated by Charles Andrew Weeks (2003, ISBN 0809142066)
- Vincent de Paul and Louise de Marillac: Rules, Conferences, and Writings, edited by Frances Ryan and John E. Rybolt (1995, ISBN 0809104717)
- William Law: A Serious Call to a Devout and Holy Life, the Spirit of Love, edited by Paul Stanwood (1978, ISBN 0809121441)
- Wycliffite Spirituality, edited by J. Patrick Hornbeck II, Stephen E. Lahey, and Fiona Somerset (2013, ISBN 0809147653)

== Judaism ==
- Abraham Isaac Kook: The Lights of Penitence, the Moral Principles, Lights of Holiness, Essays, Letters, and Poems, translated by Ben-Zion Bokser (1978, ISBN 080912159X)
- Abraham Miguel Cardozo: Selected Writings, translated by David J. Halperin (2001, ISBN 0809140233)
- The Classic Midrash: Tannaitic Commentaries on the Bible by Reuven Hammer (1995, ISBN 0809104679)
- The Early Kabbalah, edited by Joseph Dan (1986, ISBN 0809127695)
- Elijah Benamozegh: Israel and Humanity, edited by Maxwell Luria (1995, ISBN 0809135418)
- Hasidic Spirituality of a New Era: The Religious Writings of Hillel Zeitlin, edited by Arthur Green (2012, ISBN 9780809147717)
- Isaiah Horowitz: The Generations of Adam, edited by Miles Krassen (1996, ISBN 0809135906)
- Jewish Mystical Autobiographies: The Book of Visions and the Book of Secrets, translated by Morris M. Faierstein (1999, ISBN 0809105047)
- Menahem Nahum of Chernobyl: Upright Practices, the Light of the Eyes, translated by Arthur Green (1982, ISBN 0809123746)
- Nahman of Bratslav: The Tales, translated by Arnold Band (1978, ISBN 0809121034)
- Philo of Alexandria: The Contemplative Life, The Giants, and Selections by Philo of Alexandria, translated by David Winston (1981, ISBN 0809123339)
- Rabbinic Stories, translated by Jeffery L. Rubenstein (2002, ISBN 0809105330)
- Safed Spirituality: Rules of Mystical Piety, The Beginning of Wisdom, translated by Lawrence Fine (1984, ISBN 0809126125)
- The Talmud: Selected Writings, translated by Ben-Zion Bokser (1989, ISBN 0809131145)
- Zohar: The Book of Enlightenment, translated by Daniel Chanan Matt (1983, ISBN 0809123878)

== Islam ==
- Abu al-Hasan al-Shushtari: Songs of Love and Devotion, translated by Lourdes Maria Alvarez (2009, ISBN 9780809145942)
- Early Islamic Mysticism: Sufi, Qur’an, Mi’raj, Poetic and Theological Writings, edited by Michael A. Sells (1996, ISBN 0809104776)
- Fakhruddin Iraqi: Divine Flashes, translated by William C. Chittick and Peter L. Wilson (1982, ISBN 080912372X)
- Farid ad-Din Attar’s Memorial of God’s Friends: Lives and Sayings of Sufis, translated by Paul Edward Losensky (2009, ISBN 9780809145737)
- Ibn 'Abbad of Ronda: Letters on the Sufi Path, translated by John Renard (1986, ISBN 080912730X)
- Ibn Al 'Arabi: The Bezels of Wisdom, translated by R. W. J. Austin (1980, ISBN 0809123312)
- Ibn ‘Ata’ Illah Iskandari/Kwaja Abdullah Ansari: The Book of Wisdom/Intimate Conversations, translated by Victor Danner and Wheeler M. Thackston (1978, ISBN 0809121824)
- Knowledge of God in Classical Sufism: Foundations of Islamic Mystical Theology, translated by John Renard (2004, ISBN 0809140306)
- Nizam Ad-Din Awliya: Morals for the Heart, translated by Bruce B. Lawrence (1992, ISBN 0809104512)
- Sharafuddin Maneri: The Hundred Letters, translated by Paul Jackson (1980, ISBN 0809122294)
- Umar Ibn al-Farid: Sufi Verse, Saintly Life, translated by Thomas Emil Homerin (2001, ISBN 0809105284)

== Native American Spirituality ==
- Native North American Spirituality of the Eastern Woodlands: Sacred Myths, Dreams, Visions, Speeches, Healing Formulas, Rituals and Ceremonials, edited by Elizabeth Tooker (1979, ISBN 0809122561)
- Native Meso-American Spirituality: Ancient Myths, Discourses, Stories, Doctrines, Hymns, Poems from the Aztec, Yucatec, Quiche-Maya and Other Sacred Traditions, edited by Miguel León-Portilla (1980, ISBN 0809122316)
