= Clare Kirchberger =

English Anglican nun and medievalist (1889–1960)

Clare Kirchberger (born Clara Kirchberger; 22 September 1889 – 6 November 1960) was an Anglican nun, medievalist and librarian, who edited and translated several works of Christian mysticism.

== Life ==
Kirchberger was born in 1889 in London, the daughter of German emigrants Karl Kirchberger and Emma Reis Kirchberger. Her father was a merchant with the East India Company. She was educated at South Hampstead High School and Somerville College, Oxford. In 1912, she was baptised into the Anglican faith. That same year, she was the only woman to obtain a first class in Modern Languages in the Oxford final examinations. She was Assistant Lecturer in Modern Languages at Girton College in 1913–14. Around 1914, she joined the All Saints' Anglican Sisterhood at St Albans.

Kirchberger's 1927 adaptation to modern English of The Mirror of Simple Souls was published in the Orchard Spiritual Classics series, "part of the rediscovery by a newly reinvigorated English Roman Catholic intelligentsia of what they saw as their own pre-Reformation heritage". Like Evelyn Underhill before her, Kirchberger assumed its French author was male. She tentatively identified its Middle English translator as Michael of Northburgh.

== Works ==
- (ed.) A Mirror of Simple Souls. London: Burns Oates and Washbourne, 1927.
- 'A Link with Little Gidding', Theology, Vol. 52, Issue 350 (1949), pp. 294–298
- 'The Cleansing of Man's Soul', Life of the Spirit, Vol. 4, No. 43 (January 1950), pp. 290–295.
- (ed.) The goad of love: an unpublished translation of the Stimulus amoris, formerly attributed to St. Bonaventura , tr. by Walter Hilton. London: Faber and Faber, 1952.
- (ed.) The coasts of the country; an anthology of prayer drawn from the early English spiritual writers. London: Harvill Press, 1952.
- 'Some Notes on the Ancrene Riwle', Dominican Studies, Vol. 7 (1954), pp. 215–38
- (tr., with introduction and notes) Selected writings on contemplation by Richard of Saint Victor. London: Faber and Faber, 1957.
- (ed.) Spiritual exercises by William Perin, O.P.. With a foreword by Vincent McNabb. London: Blackfriars, 1957.
