= Horologium Sapientiae =

- Illustration of the clock of wisdom from a French translation copied at Lille in 1448
- Author: Henry Suso
- Language: Latin
- Genre: Christian literature
- Publication date: 14th Century
- Publication place: Germany
- Media type: Book

Horologium Sapientiae was written by the German Dominican Henry Suso between 1328 and 1330. The book belongs to the tradition of Rhineland mystics and German mysticism. It was quickly translated into a range of European languages and (alongside Pseudo Bonaventure's Meditations on the Life of Christ and Ludolph of Saxony's Life of Christ) it was one of the three most popular European devotional texts of the fourteenth and fifteenth centuries.

== Editions and Texts ==
The book was translated into Middle English as The Seven Points of True Love and Everlasting Wisdom; a translation into modern English renders the Latin title "Clock of Wisdom" as Wisdom's Watch on the Hours. It circulated widely in vernacular languages such as English, French, Dutch, and Italian as well as surviving in more than 233 medieval Latin manuscripts.

== Contents ==
The Horologium is divided into two books. Book 1 contains 16 chapters and focuses on considerations around Christ's passion whilst book 2 contains 8 chapters.

- Chp 1 How souls are drawn to God
- Chp 2 How the passion of Christ is a prelude to the knowledge of God
- Chp 3 Christ's sufferings and how they were necessary
- Chp 4 How the soul finds Christ through penance
- Chp 5 A lamentation over the loss of fervour
- Chp 6 The divine spouse is eternal wisdom
- Chp 7 Divine wisdom is both lovable and terrible
- Chp 8 Divine visitations come and go, and how the soul should respond
- Chp 9 Why divine wisdom allows people to suffer
- Chp 10 Of the torments of hell
- Chp 11 Of the joys of heaven
- Chp 12 Dealing with objections
- Chp 13 How it is profitable to suffer tribulations
- Chp 14 How profitable it is to consider Christ's passion
- Chp 15 How a true disciple should conform himself to the passion
- Chp 16 A commendation of the Virgin Mary

Book 2 includes a focus upon Eucharistic theology.

== Influences ==
Henry Suso was a follower of Meister Eckhart and, controversially, defended his writings after his condemnation. The book follows the style of Boethius's Consolation of Philosophy, recording both Suso's frustrations and disappointments as well as spiritualising ways of dealing with them.

In chapter 9 Suso records an imaginary conversation with God in which he makes a comment about it not being surprising that God has so few friends when religious people encounter so many difficulties. This comment may have influenced traditions which claimed that Teresa of Avila made the quip "no wonder you have so few friends Lord, when you treat them so badly."

== See also ==
- Christian mysticism
- Catholic spirituality
