= Ludus amoris =

Term in the Western mystical tradition

Ludus amoris is a term in the Western mystical tradition that refers to the divine play (play of God). The term is in Latin and may first have been used by the Christian mystic Henry Suso (1300–1366). The term has also been used in the titles of works of literature and music.

Ludus amoris is a Latin-derived term from the Western mystical tradition. Literally, "ludus amoris" means "game of love". According to Evelyn Underhill's Mysticism,

The mystics have a vivid metaphor by which to describe that alternation between the onset and the absence of the joyous transcendental consciousness which forms as it were the characteristic intermediate stage between the bitter struggles of pure Purgation, and the peace and radiance of the Illuminative Life. They call it Ludus Amoris, the "Game of Love" which God plays with the desirous soul.... The "Game of Love" is a reflection in consciousness of that state of struggle, oscillation and unrest which precedes the first unification of the self. It ceases when this has taken place and the new level of reality has been attained.

According to Windeatt, "The notion of the play of love (ludus amoris) probably derives via Suso from Stimulus Amoris. The Middle English version of Suso's Horologium refers to 'þe pleye of loue þe which I am wonte to vse in an amarose sowle'."

== See also ==
- Lila (Hinduism) – Sanskrit word, "divine play"
- Ludus (love) – Love typology by J. A. Lee
