= Horologium =

Horologium (Latin for "clock") may refer to:

- Clock, a device for measuring the time
- Astronomical clock, also sometimes distinguished as a horologium
- Horologium Augusti, a solar marker built in ancient Rome by Augustus, once believed to have acted as a sundial
- Horologium, a turret clock built in 1283 in Dunstable, UK
- Horologium Sapientiae ("Clock of Wisdom"), a 14th-century book on spirituality by Henry Suso
- Horologium Oscillatorium, a 17th-century book by Christiaan Huygens on pendulum clocks
- Horologium (constellation), in the southern celestial hemisphere named in honor of Huygens's work
- Horologium-Reticulum Supercluster, in the area of the constellation
- Horologium (Orthodoxy), or Horologion, the book detailing the prayers at the canonical hours in Eastern Orthodoxy

== See also ==
- Book of hours, a personal or Western Christian equivalent of the Eastern horologium
- Horology, the science of time-keeping
- Menologium
