= Henry de Balnea =

Henry de Balnea is the mistaken identity created by Thomas Tanner for the author of Speculum spiritualium.

Balnea was of the Carthusian order. Of the exact date at which he flourished there seems to be no certain information; but as he quotes from both Richard Hampole, who died in 1349, and Walter Hylton, who died in 1395, he cannot well be assigned to an earlier period than the fifteenth century. Tanner infers that Henry de Balnea was an Englishman from the fact that he quotes Hylton in English.
