= Pope John XXII =

Head of the Catholic Church from 1316 to 1334

- Bishop of Rome
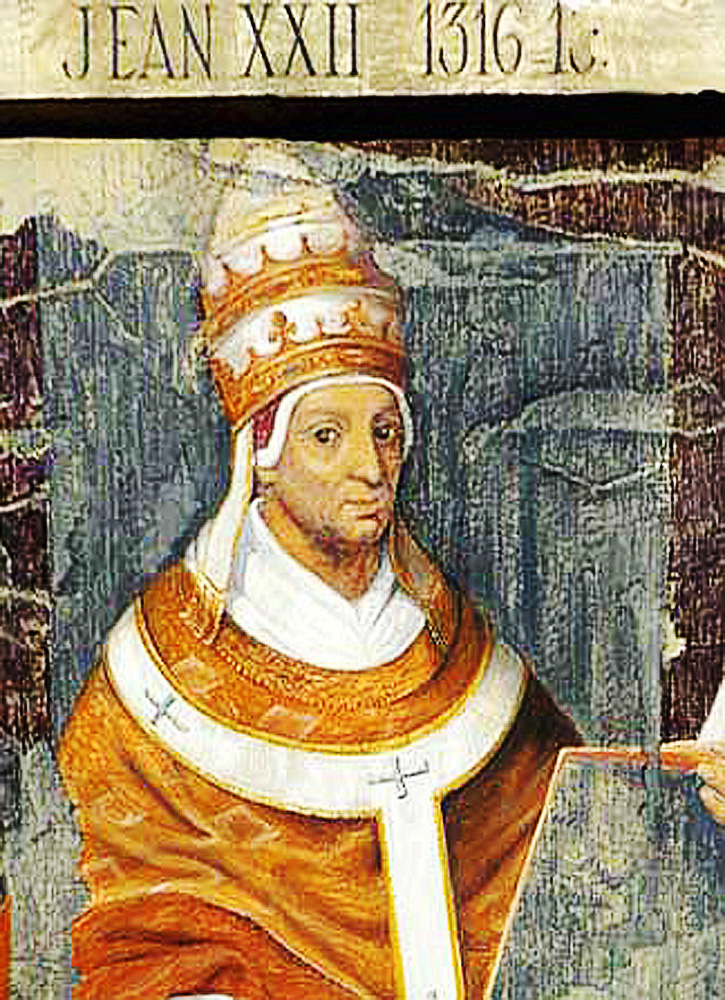
- Portrait fresco of John XXII, 14th century (Collection of the Palais du Roure, Avignon)
- Church: Catholic Church
- Papacy began: 7 August 1316
- Papacy ended: 4 December 1334
- Predecessor: Clement V
- Successor: Benedict XII

Orders
- Created cardinal: 23 December 1312 by Clement V

Personal details
- Born: Jacques Duèze or d'Euse c. 1244 Cahors, Kingdom of France
- Died: 4 December 1334 (aged 89–90) Avignon, Comtat Venaissin, Papal States
- Coat of arms

Papal styles of Pope John XXII
- Reference style: His Holiness
- Spoken style: Thine Holiness
- Religious style: Holy Father
- Posthumous style: None

Pope John XXII (Latin: Ioannes XXII, Italian: Giovanni XXII, French: Jean XXII; 1244 – 4 December 1334), born Jacques Duèze (or d'Euse), was head of the Catholic Church from 7 August 1316 to his death, in December 1334. He was the second and longest-reigning Avignon Pope, elected by the Conclave of Cardinals, which was assembled in Lyon. Like his predecessor, Clement V, Pope John centralized power and income in the Papacy and lived a princely life in Avignon.

John opposed the policies of Louis IV the Bavarian as Holy Roman Emperor, which prompted Louis to invade Italy and set up an antipope, Nicholas V. John also opposed the Franciscan understanding of the poverty of Christ and his apostles, promulgating multiple papal bulls to enforce his views. This led William of Ockham to write against unlimited papal power.

Following a three-year process, John canonized Thomas Aquinas on 18 July 1323. One of John's sermons on the beatific vision caused controversy which lasted until he retracted his views just before his death. John died in Avignon on 4 December 1334, around age 90.

== Early life and election ==
Born in 1244, Jacques was the son of Arnaud Duèze, who was probably a Cahorsin merchant or banker. He studied canon law at Montpellier and theology in Paris. Jacques taught civil law at Cahors and later canon law at Toulouse. By 1295, he was counselor to Bishop Louis of Toulouse. Following Louis's death in 1297, Jacques was installed as the temporary chancellor of the University of Avignon and by 1299 was canon of Puy. On the recommendation of Charles II of Naples he was made Bishop of Fréjus in 1300. Jacques was still bishop of Fréjus when in 1307, a knight named William d'Arcis and a priest named Bertrand Recordus attempted to kill him. Both of them were imprisoned and in 1309 were sentenced to death.

In 1308, Jacques was appointed chancellor of Charles II, and it was due to his influence that the gladiatorial games in Naples were banned. On 18 March 1310, he was made Bishop of Avignon. He delivered legal opinions favorable to the suppression of the Templars, but he also defended Boniface VIII and the Bull Unam Sanctam. On 23 December 1312, Clement V made him Cardinal-Bishop of Porto-Santa Rufina.

The limits of papal power became a source of conflict between reigning pope Clement V and Emperor Henry VII, culminating with the sudden death of Pope Clement V in 1314. The period that followed was an interregnum of two years due to disagreements between the cardinals, who were split into three factions. After two years of inaction, Philip, Count of Poitiers summoned a papal conclave of 23 cardinals to Lyon in August 1316. Philip forbade the cardinals from leaving until they had chosen a new Pope. On 7 August 1316, this conclave elected Jacques, who took the name John XXII and was crowned in Lyon. He set up his residence in Avignon rather than Rome, continuing the Avignon Papacy of his predecessor.

== Papacy ==
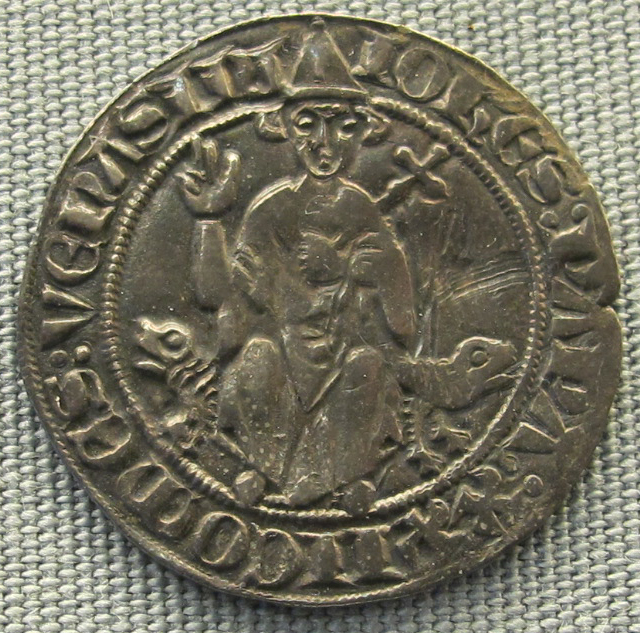
Coin of John XXII

Upon his election, John gave 35,000 florins, of the 70,000 left to him by Clement V, to the cardinals that had voted for him. He was an excellent administrator and efficient at reorganizing the Catholic Church. He favored a regulation-heavy form of governance. John was known to have a temper, and involved himself in the politics and religious movements of many European countries in order to advance the interests of the papacy. He would routinely write to non-Catholic leaders asserting his authority over them.

In 1316, John introduced the Corpus Christi procession in Orvieto due to its association with the miracle of Bolsena.

On 7 April 1317, John canonized Louis of Toulouse with the papal bull Sol oriens. In 1318, he sent a letter of thanks to the Muslim ruler Özbeg Khan, who was tolerant of Christians and treated them kindly. John has traditionally been credited with having composed the prayer "Anima Christi", which has become the English "Soul of Christ, sanctify me ...". On 27 March 1329, John condemned many writings of Meister Eckhart as heretical in his papal bull In Agro Dominico. He allowed the consuls of Cahors to establish a small university in that city.

In June 1332, John declared his intention to move his residence to Bologna. In preparation of this, the cardinal legate, Bertrand du Pouget, had been working for years in Bologna to oversee the construction of a papal palace and to integrate the political climate for the papacy's arrival. By August, however, John deemed the safety of the city insufficient. The Bishop of Embrun, Bertrand de Déaulx, arrived to assist Pouget but simply exacerbated the situation. This led to a revolt in 1334, Pouget's expulsion, and death threats for any member of the Curia. The papal palace was destroyed and it took John's successor, Benedict XII, many years to find peace with Bologna. John died in Avignon on 4 December 1334 (aged 89/90). He was buried in Avignon, at the cathedral of Notre-Dame-des-Doms.

=== Edward II and Irish bishoprics ===
John received an embassy, in December 1316, from Edward II of England concerning the empty bishoprics of Dublin and Cashel. Edward presented his preferred appointees and was adamant that John not promote any native Irishman to bishop or archbishop. John promoted William FitzJohn, bishop of Ossory to the bishopric of Cashel, while Alexander Bicknor, a personal recommendation of Edward, was given Dublin.

In January 1318, John sent a congratulatory letter to Edward II on his victory over Edward Bruce. He had passed an excommunication of all enemies of Edward II and later singled out Robert and Edward Bruce. John had allowed Edward II to keep the crusade tax imposed by the Council of Vienne, while reminding him that England was a papal fief and that he owed John an oath of loyalty. A few months later, John heard from Irish princes petitioning for the replacement of Edward II as sovereign lord of Ireland, stating that successive kings of England had not respected the papal grant of Ireland to Henry II of England. John's letter to Edward implied that a second papal evaluation of the lordship of Ireland was not out of the question.

=== Canonization of Thomas Aquinas ===
By November 1317, Guillelmo de Tocco, Prior of the Benevento Dominican monastery, was heading a preliminary investigation into Thomas Aquinas' sainthood. In the summer of 1318, John met with de Tocco, who presented letters from the regal heads of Sicily imploring for a papal inquiry into the sainthood of Aquinas. De Tocco also presented John with notarized records of Aquinas's miracles and requests from princes and universities asking for Aquinas's canonization. John chose three cardinals, none of whom was a Dominican, to scrutinize the presented records. Finding no errors, they gave their recommendation to John. John then issued two letters, nominating as papal commissioners: Umberto, Archbishop of Naples; Angelo, Bishop of Viterbo; and Pandulpho de Sabbello, who was unable to attend.

De Tocco gathered two of the three papal commissioners in the Archbishop's palace in Naples and the inquiry lasted from 21 July to 18 September 1319. On the final day, the documentation of the inquiry was signed, sealed and sent to the Papal Curia at Avignon. Upon receiving the documents, John turned them over to a cardinal committee. On 23 June 1321, John created a new commission consisting of Peter Ferri, Bishop of Agnani, Andrew, Bishop of Terracina, and Pandulpho de Sabbello. This inquiry lasted fifteen days, during which the commission heard the testimony of 111 witnesses. The commission sent finalized documents to the Papal Curia and John XXII canonized Thomas Aquinas formally on 18 July 1323.

=== Conflict with Louis IV ===
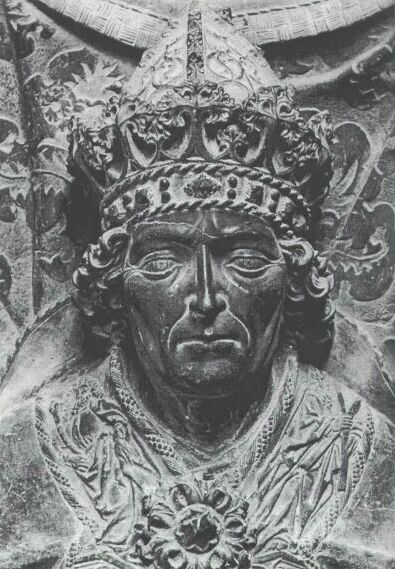
Emperor Louis IV

Prior to John XXII's election, a contest had begun for the Holy Roman Empire's crown between Louis IV the Bavarian and Frederick I of Austria. Initially, John was neutral and refrained from being an arbiter. On 25 November 1314, Louis, with the votes from five of the seven electors, was crowned king of the Germans at Aachen, by the archbishop of Mainz, while Frederick received only two votes the day before. In response, in April 1317, John imposed a new concept, vacante imperio, granting the power to administer the empire to the pope, which was contained within the papal bull Si fratrum.

By 1322, faced with a growing Ghibelline movement in northern Italy, John had instructed his papal legate, Bertrand du Poujet, to call for a crusade against Milan. Louis, acting with Imperial powers, sent an army to reinforce Milan in early 1323. In response, John detailed violations committed by Louis and upon receiving no response excommunicated him on 23 March 1324 and then deposed him on 11 July. Louis called a council of Italian Ghibellines to Trent, where Louis declared his support for the Spiritualist Franciscans and denounced John as an illegitimate and heretical pope. John retaliated by declaring any city to offer Louis welcome would be placed under interdict. He received an embassy from Rome which issued an ultimatum of either returning to Rome or suffering the Holy City's submission to Louis IV. John sent his papal legate, Giovanni Orsini, to Rome, but Orsini was denied entry. In reprisal, Orsini placed Rome under interdict.

Louis entered Rome on 17 January 1328. In St. Peter's cathedral, he was consecrated by two sympathetic cardinal bishops, and crowned by Rome's representative, Sciarra della Colonna. Pietro Rainalducci (Note: Associate Professor of Medieval History, Irene Bueno, and Professor Emeritus of History, David Burr both state it was Peter of Corbara that became Nicholas V) was created Antipope Nicholas V in May 1328, by Louis. In response, John, using the death of archbishop Matthias von Buchegg to gain an ecclesiastical and political edge, appointed Heinrich von Virneburg as Archbishop of Mainz to assist in the struggle against the Emperor. Following Louis's coronation of Nicholas V, Franciscan Minister General Michael Cesena, Bonagrazia Bergamo, and William of Ockham all fled Avignon. In 1330, Antipope Nicholas V submitted just before the Pope's death.

=== Franciscan poverty ===
John XXII was determined to suppress what he considered to be the excesses of the Spirituals, who contended eagerly for the view that Christ and his apostles had possessed absolutely nothing, citing in support of their view Pope Nicholas III's bull Exiit qui seminat. On 7 October 1317, John XXII promulgated the bull Quorumdam exigit, clarifying the earlier bulls issued by Nicholas III and Clement V, Exiit qui seminat and Exivi de paradiso, and stating unequivocally that obedience was a greater virtue than chastity or poverty. On 26 March 1322, with the bull Quia nonnunquam, he removed the ban on discussion of Exiit qui seminat, and commissioned experts to examine the idea of poverty based on belief that Christ and the apostles owned nothing. The experts disagreed among themselves, but the majority condemned the idea on the grounds that it would deny the church's right to have possessions. The Franciscan chapter held in Perugia in June 1322 responded with two encyclicals stating that all judgments made by the Roman Church were to be regarded as final and could not be revoked if they were not erroneous. By the bull Ad conditorem canonum of 8 December 1322, John XXII declared it ridiculous to pretend that every scrap of food given to the friars and eaten by them belonged to the pope, refused to accept ownership over the goods of the Franciscans in future and granted them exemption from the rule that absolutely forbade ownership of anything even in common, thus forcing them to accept ownership. On 12 November 1323, he issued the bull Quum inter nonnullos, which declared "erroneous and heretical" the doctrine that Christ and his apostles had no possessions whatsoever.

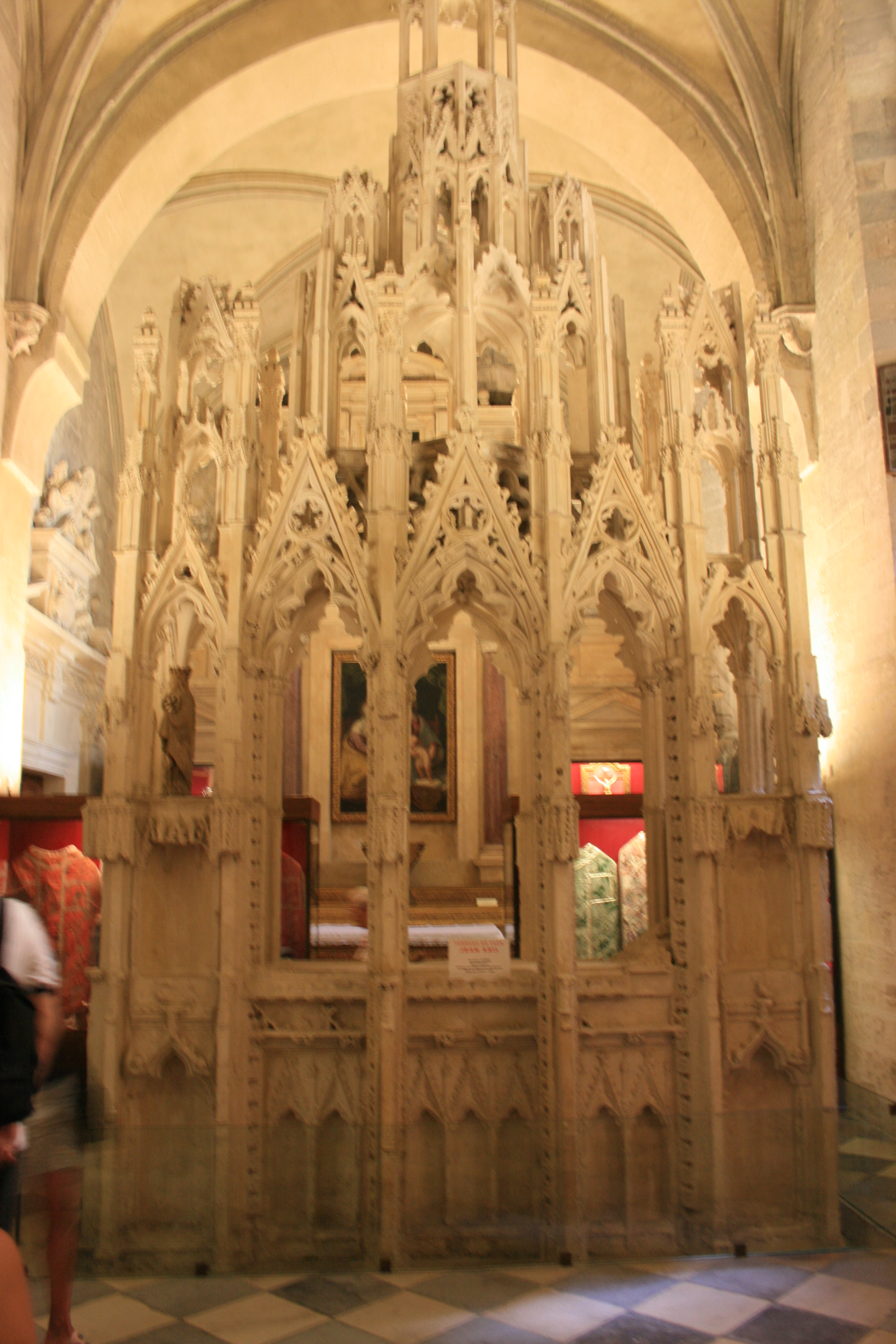
Tomb of John XXII in the Treasury room of the Cathédrale Notre-Dame des Doms d'Avignon

Influential members of the order protested, such as the minister general Michael of Cesena, the English provincial William of Ockham, and Bonagratia of Bergamo. In reply to the argument of his opponents that Nicholas III's bull Exiit qui seminat was fixed and irrevocable, John XXII issued the bull Quia quorundam on 10 November 1324, in which he declared that it cannot be inferred from the words of the 1279 bull that Christ and the apostles had nothing, adding: "Indeed, it can be inferred rather that the Gospel life lived by Christ and the Apostles did not exclude some possessions in common, since living 'without property' does not require that those living thus should have nothing in common." With the bull Quia vir reprobus of 16 November 1329, John replied to Michael of Cesena's Appellatio.

=== Beatific vision controversy ===
Between November 1331 and March 1332, John XXII made four controversial sermons concerning the beatific vision in which John argued that those who died in the faith did not see the presence of God until the Last Judgment.. In January 1334, in complete opposition to John XXII, the Faculty of Theology of the Sorbonne stated that after death the blessed souls are raised to the beatific vision. Louis, sensing an opportunity to remove him, conspired with cardinal Napoleone Orsini to depose John at an ecumenical council. John backed down from his position on the day before his death, agreeing that those who die in grace do indeed immediately enjoy the beatific vision.

=== Role in witchcraft suppression ===
Pope John's reign saw an important change in papal and inquisitorial attitudes towards witchcraft suppression compared to the reign of his predecessors, such as Pope Alexander IV. Kors points to the fact that Pope John had been the victim of an assassination attempt via poisoning and sorcery as a personal factor behind this change. As such, Pope John's involvement with witchcraft suppression can be officially traced to his 1326 papal bull Super illius specula in which he laid out a description of those who engage in witchcraft. Pope John also warned people against not only learning magic or teaching it but against the more "execrable" act of performing magic. Pope John stated that anyone who did not heed his "most charitable" warning would be excommunicated. Pope John officially declared witchcraft to be heresy, and thus it could be tried under the Inquisition. Although this was the official ruling for the church, Pope John's first order dealing with magic being tried by the Inquisition was in a letter written in 1320 by Cardinal William of Santa Sabina. The letter was addressed to the Inquisitors of Carcassonne and Toulouse. In the letter Cardinal William states that with the authority of Pope John the Inquisitors there were to investigate witches by "whatever means available" as if witches were any other heretic. The letter went on to describe the actions of those who would be seen as witches and extended power to the Inquisition for the prosecution of any and all cases that fit any part of the description laid out in the letter.

== See also ==
- Bernard Jarre – Catholic cardinal
- Cardinals created by John XXII
- Spondent Pariter – papal decretal issued by Pope John XXII forbidding fraudulent alchemy

== Sources ==
- Beattie, Blake R (2007). Angelus pacis: the legation of Cardinal Giovanni Gaetano Orsini, 1326–1334. Medieval Mediterranean. Vol. v. 67. Leiden Boston: Brill. ISBN 978-9047411000. OCLC 290558761.
- Boudet, Jean-Patrice and Julien Théry (2012). « Le procès de Jean XXII contre l'archevêque d'Aix Robert de Mauvoisin : astrologie, arts prohibés et politique (1317–1318) », in Jean XXII et le Midi (Cahiers de Fanjeaux, 45), Toulouse, Privat, 2012, pp. 159–235.
- Brown, Jaqueline (1991). "The Declaratio on Jon XXII's Decree Exercrabilis and the Early History of the Rota," Bulletin of Medieval Canon Law, 47 (n.s. Vol. 21), pp. 47–139.
- Brett, Annabel S. (2003). Liberty, Right and Nature: Individual Rights in Later Scholastic Thought. Cambridge University Press.
- Brunner, Melanie (2011). "Poverty and Charity: Pope John XXII and the canonization of Louis of Anjou". Franciscan Studies. 69.
- Bueno, Irene (2015). Defining Heresy: Inquisition, Theology, and Papal Policy in the Time of Jacques Fournier. Brill.
- Burnham, Louisa A. (2008). So Great a Light, So Great a Smoke: The Beguin Heretics of Languedoc. Cornell University Press.
- Burr, David (2001). The Spiritual Franciscans: From Protest to Persecution in the Century After Saint Francis. The Pennsylvania University Press.
- Cassell, Anthony K. (2004). The Monarchia Controversy: An Historical Study with Accompanying Translations of Dante Alighieri's Monarchia, Guido Vernani's Refutation of the Monarchia Composed by Dante and Pope John XXII's Bull, Si Fratrum. Catholic University of America Press.
- Cusato, Michael F.; Geltner, Guy (2009). Defenders and Critics of Franciscan Life: Essays in Honor of John V. Fleming. Brill. ISBN 978-9004176300.
- Di Cristo, Massimiliano Traversino (2022). Against the Backdrop of Sovereignty and Absolutism: The Theology of God's Power and Its Bearing on the Western Legal Tradition, 1100–1600. Brill.
- Duval-Arnould, Louis (2002). "Nicholas V". In Levillain, Philippe (ed.). The Papacy: An Encyclopedia. Vol. 2: Gaius-Proxies. Routledge.
- Eckhart, Meister (1981). Colledge, Edmund; McGinn, Bernard (eds.). Meister Eckhart, the Essential Sermons, Commentaries, Treatises, and Defense: The Essential Sermons, Commentaries, Treatises, and Defense. Paulist Press. p. 77. ISBN 978-0-8091-2370-4.
- Epstein, Steven A. (2007). Purity Lost: Transgressing Boundaries in the Eastern Mediterranean, 1000–1400. Johns Hopkins University Press.
- Frame, Robin (1998). Ireland and Britain, 1170–1450. The Hambledon Press.
- Gerulaitis, Leonardas V. (1967). "The Canonization of Saint Thomas Aquinas". Vivarium. 5 (1). Brill: 25–46. doi:10.1163/156853467X00041.
- Grieco, Holly J. (2013). "'In Some Way Even More than Before': Approaches to Understanding St. Louis of Anjou, Franciscan Bishop of Toulouse". In Geltner, Guy; Lester, Anne E.; Jansen, Katherine Ludwig (eds.). Center and Periphery: Studies on Power in the Medieval World in Honor of William Chester Jordan. Brill. pp. 135–156.
- Juhász, Gergely (2015). Translating Resurrection: The Debate Between William Tyndale and George Joye in Its Historical and Theological Context. Brill.
- Kors, Alan C.; Peters, Edward, eds. (2001). Witchcraft in Europe, 1100–1700: A Documentary History (2 ed.). University of Pennsylvania Press.
- Lambert, Malcolm (1992). Medieval Heresy: Popular Movements from the Gregorian Reform to the Reformation. Blackwell Publishing. p. 209. ISBN 978-0-631-17431-8.
- Levillain, Philippe, ed. (2002). "John XXII". The Papacy: An Encyclopedia. Vol. 2: Gaius-Proxies. Routledge.
- McBrien, Richard P. (2000). Lives of the Popes. HarperCollins.
- McClure, Julia (2017). The Franciscan Invention of the New World. Palgrave Macmillan.
- Menache, Sophia (1998). Clement V. Cambridge University Press.
- Milani, Guiliano (2018). "From One Conflict to Another". In Blanshei, Sarah R. (ed.). A Companion to Medieval and Renaissance Bologna. Brill.
- Mollat, Guillaume (1967). "Jean XXII et les Chapitres des cathedrales". Archivum Historiae Pontificiae. 5: 340–344. JSTOR 23563551.
- Nold, Patrick (2003). Pope John XXII and his Franciscan Cardinal: Bertrand de la Tour and the Apostolic Poverty Controversy. Oxford.
- Ocker, Christopher (2022). The Hybrid Reformation: A Social, Cultural, and Intellectual History of Contending Forces. Cambridge University Press.
- Partner, Peter (2022). The Lands of St Peter: The Papal State in the Middle Ages and the Early Renaissance. University of California Press.
- Pfeil, Fritz (1910). Der Kampf Gerlachs von Nassau mit Heinrich von Virneburg um das Erzstift Mainz (in German). Darmstadt.
- Pluger, Karsten (2005). England and the Avignon Popes: The Practice of Diplomacy in Late Medieval Europe. Taylor & Francis.
- Richardson, Carol M. (2009). Reclaiming Rome: Cardinals in the Fifteenth Century. Brill.
- Rollo-Koster, Joëlle (2015). Avignon and Its Papacy, 1309–1417: Popes, Institutions, and Society. Rowman & Littlefield Publishers.
- Rowell, S.C. (1994). Lithuania Ascending: A pagan empire within East-Central Europe, 1295–1345. Cambridge University Press.
- Rubin, Miri (1991). Corpus Christi: The Eucharist in Late Medieval Culture. Cambridge University Press.
- Schatz, Klaus (1996). Papal Primacy: From Its Origins to the Present. Liturgical Press. pp. 117–118. ISBN 978-0-8146-5522-1.
- Scott, John A. (2016). Dante's Political Purgatory. University of Pennsylvania Press.
- Tierney, Brian (1972). Origins of papal infallibility, 1150–1350: a study on the concepts of infallibility, sovereignty and tradition in the Middle Age. Leiden, Netherlands: E.J. Brill. p. 181.
- Theis, Valerie (2018). "A New Seat for the Papacy: Benedict XII, Avignon, and the Comtat Venaissin". In Bueno, Irene (ed.). Pope Benedict XII (1334–1342): The Guardian of Orthodoxy. Amsterdam University Press.
- Valois, Noel (1914). "Jacques Duèse (le pape Jean XXII)". Histoire Littéraire de la France. 34: 391–630. (in French)
- Verger, Jacques (2006). "The universities". In Jones, Michael (ed.). The New Cambridge Medieval History. Vol. VI: c. 1300–c. 1415. Cambridge University Press. pp. 66–81.
- Watt, J. A. (1956). "Negotiations between Edward II and John XXII concerning Ireland". Irish Historical Studies. 10, No. 37 (March) (37). Cambridge University Press: 1–20. doi:10.1017/S0021121400016138. S2CID 164105712.
- Weakland, John E. (1968). "Administrative and Fiscal Centralization under Pope John XXII, 1316–1334". The Catholic Historical Review. 54 (1): 39–54. JSTOR 25018107.
- Weakland, John E. (1972). "John XXII before his pontificate, 1244–1316: Jacques Duèse and his Family". Archivum Historiae Pontificiae. 10. Gregorian Biblical Press: 161–185. JSTOR 23564073.
- Williams, George L. (1998). Papal Genealogy: The Families and Descendants of the Popes. McFarland & Company Inc.
- Wilson, Peter H. (2016). Heart of Europe: A History of the Holy Roman Empire. Harvard University Press.
- Wilks, Michael (2008). The Problem of Sovereignty in the Later Middle Ages: The Papal Monarchy with Augustinus Triumphus and the Publicists. Cambridge University Press.

Catholic Church titles
Preceded by Clement V	Pope; 1316 – 1334	Succeeded by Benedict XII
