= Dorothy Everett =

English medieval literature scholar (1894 – 1953)

- Born: 1894; King's Lynn
- Died: 1953 (aged 58–59)

Academic background
- Education: Girton College, Cambridge, Bryn Mawr College

Academic work
- Discipline: Medieval literary scholar
- Sub-discipline: Middle English, Chaucer studies
- Institutions: Lady Margaret Hall, Oxford, Somerville College, Oxford
- Notable students: Helen Gardner, Rosemary Dorward, Priscilla Tolkien

Dorothy Everett (1894 – 1953) was an English scholar of medieval literature known for her work on romance, Chaucer, the Gawain poet, alliterative verse, and the psalter of Richard Rolle. Holding academic positions at three colleges at the University of Oxford, she was also a prolific editor and reviewer.

Everett’s readings of individual texts, including Sir Gawain and the Green Knight and especially the English Psalter of Richard Rolle, have remained influential into the twenty-first century. She is credited with opening up a new strand of structural studies in Chaucerian narratives by acknowledging his influence from rhetorical manuals, and of bringing the Arthurian poet Layamon into critical focus. More broadly, her contributions to the definition of the romance genre, which focus on its content and ‘grammar’, remain influential.

== Education ==
Born in King’s Lynn on 10 May 1894, she studied as an exhibition scholar at Girton College, Cambridge in 1913 – 16, where she graduated with a First in Medieval and Modern Languages. In 1917, she held a British Scholarship at Bryn Mawr College, Pennsylvania. In 1922, while working as Assistant Lecturer at Royal Holloway College, she earned an MA for her thesis on the English Psalter of Richard Rolle.

== Editing and reviews ==
Everett was a contributor to the Annual Bibliography of English Language and Literature from its inception in 1921 and served as editor from 1926 until 1928. She was editor of the Middle English section of the Year’s Work in English Studies for 25 years, which allowed her to produce ‘many authoritative and influential reviews’ of Chaucer scholarship.

== Oxford career ==
After tutoring at St Hugh’s College, Oxford, and spending a year as lecturer in English at Somerville College, she was appointed tutor in English Language and Literature at Lady Margaret Hall, where she became a Fellow in 1928. In 1930 she received a University Lectureship in Middle English. Her university responsibilities included a place on the Board of the English Faculty at Oxford and examining at several universities in London and Wales. In 1948 she became Oxford’s first Reader in English Language.

Her students included Helen Gardner, whom she suggested work on Middle English mystic texts and encouraged to apply for a post as tutor at Oxford; Rosemary Birts, who began editing The Scale of Perfection under her tutelage; and Priscilla Tolkien.

She died on 22 June 1953 after a long illness.

== Select bibliography ==
=== Essay collection ===
- Essays on Middle English Literature (1955)
  - 'A Characterisation of the English Medieval Romances' (originally published 1929)
  - 'Layamon and the Earliest Middle English Alliterative Verse'
  - 'The Alliterative Revival'
  - 'Chaucer's Love Visions, with particular reference to the Parlement of Foules'
  - 'Chaucer's "Good Ear"' (originally published 1947)
  - 'Some Reflections on Chaucer's "Art Poetical"' (originally given as the Sir Israel Gollancz Memorial Lecture at the British Academy, 1950)

=== Articles ===
- 'The Middle English Prose Psalter of Richard Rolle of Hampole' (1922)
- 'Another Collation of the Ellesmere Manuscript of the Canterbury Tales' (1932)
- 'The Relationship of Chestre's Launfal and Lybeaus Desconus' (1938)
- 'Legal Phraseology in a passage in Pearl' (1947)
