= Vita Christi =

1374 text by Ludolph of Saxony

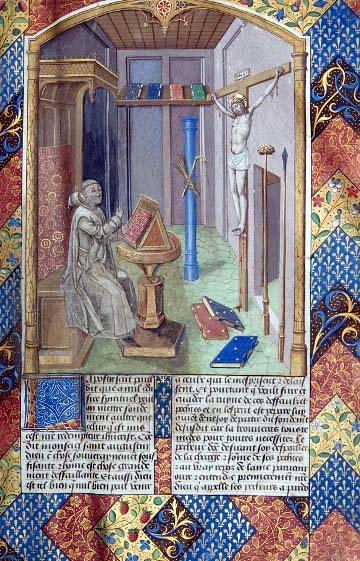
Vita Christi by Ludolph of Saxony, Vol. 1, folio.

The Vita Christi (Life of Christ), also known as the Speculum vitae Christi (Mirror of the Life of Christ) is the principal work of Ludolph of Saxony, completed in 1374.

The book is not just a biography of Jesus, but also a history, a commentary borrowed from the Church Fathers, and a series of dogmatic and moral dissertations, spiritual instructions, meditations, and prayers. It was so popular in its time that it has been called a summa evangelica.

== Sources ==
The Vita Christi provides an encyclopedic meditation on the life of Jesus Christ drawing on a wealth of sources, from the patristic era to the author's own day. Ludolph's favorite authors are Augustine and John Chrysostom (each cited nearly a thousand times), followed in frequency by Jerome, Bede, Gregory the Great, Bernard, Anselm, and Theophylact. In a number of cases the works are by authors closer to Ludolph's time whose works were attributed to these famous writers. A very large number of his citations are given without attribution, drawing on glosses, 12th c. Gospel commentaries, the works of Scholastic theologians, and contemporaries of Ludolph.

Sr Mary Immaculate Bodenstedt mentions Ludolph's particular debt to the Meditations on the Life of Christ. Bodenstedt argues that Ludolph also follows Ps.-Bonaventure in his visual method of meditation.

== Influence ==
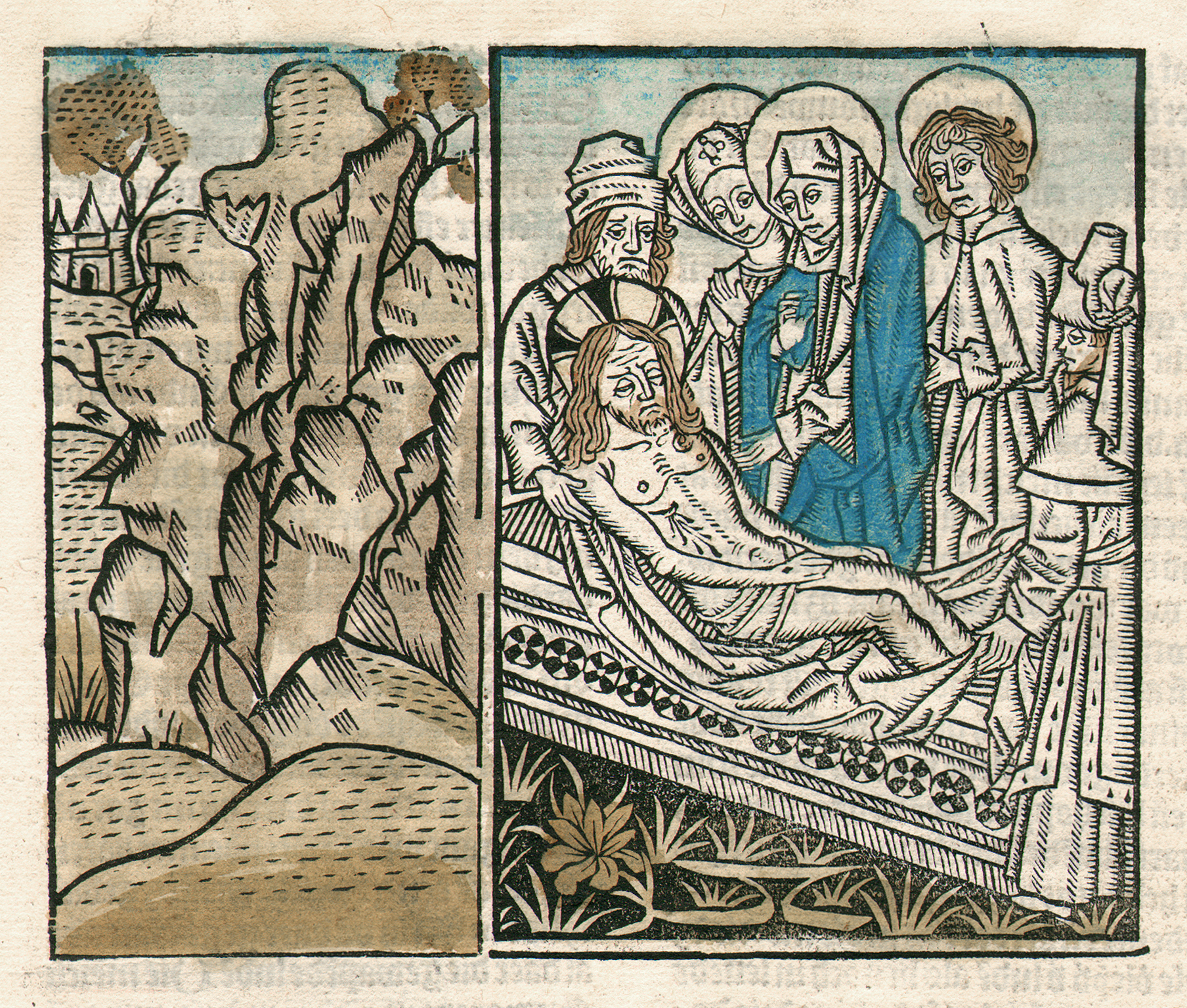
Vita Christi by Ludolph of Saxony. Woodcut. 1487.

The great popularity of the Vita Christi is demonstrated by the numerous manuscript copies preserved in libraries and the manifold editions of it which have been published, from the first two editions of Strasbourg and Cologne, in 1474, to the last editions of Paris: folio, 1865, published by Victor Palme (heavily criticised by Father Henry James Coleridge, SJ; see below), and 8vo, 1878. It has also been translated into Catalan (Valencia, 1495, folio, Gothic), Castilian (Alcala, folio, Gothic), Portuguese (1495, 4 vols., folio), Italian (1570), French, "by Guillaume Lernenand, of the Order of Monseigneur St. François", under the title of the "Great Life of Christ" (Lyons, 1487, folio, many times reprinted), by D. Marie-Prosper Augustine (Paris, 1864), and by D. Florent Broquin, Carthusian (Paris, 1883). The work was not translated into English, but scholars have offered explanations.

The Vita Christi had significant influence on the development of techniques for Christian meditation. Although Aelred of Rievaulx (d. 1167) had introduced the concept of immersing and projecting oneself into a Biblical scene in his De institutione inclusarum, and St. Bonaventure (d. 1274) had borrowed heavily from that work in his Lignum Vitae, Ludolph's massive work (which quoted Aelred extensively but credited his work to Anselm) helped to spread this devotional practice into the Devotio Moderna community and to Ignatius of Loyola (as discussed below). The Vita Christi was translated into Spanish in 1502 by Ambrosio Montesino and was printed in Alcala. The methods of meditation in the Vita Christi thus entered Spain and were known in the early part of the 16th century. St Teresa and St Francis de Sales frequently quote from it.

== Influence on St Ignatius of Loyola ==
Saint Ignatius of Loyola used these techniques in his Spiritual Exercises, e.g. self-projection into a Biblical scene to start a conversation with Christ in Calvary. Ludolph's Vita Christi is mentioned in almost every biography of St Ignatius of Loyola. St Ignatius read it whilst recovering from the cannon-ball wound after the siege of Pamplona in a Castilian translation. Because the Bible had not yet been made available in a Castilian translation at this time, reading the Vita Christi provided an opportunity for Ignatius to encounter the text of the Gospel itself. Ludolph proposes a method of prayer which asks the reader to visualise the events of Christ's life (known as simple contemplation). In his commentary on the Gospel for the Feast of Saint Mary Magdalen, the story where Mary the sister of Lazarus, comes into the house of the Pharisee where Jesus is eating, and washes his feet with her tears and then dries his feet with her hair, Ludolph repeatedly urges the reader to see (that is, visualise) the scene of the washing, and so on. He also has insights into the humanity and attractiveness of Jesus. He explains why Mary the public sinner overcame her shame and entered the house of the Pharisee by noting that the Pharisee was a leper and disfigured from the disease. St Mary Magdalen could see that since Jesus was prepared to eat with a leper, he would not reject her.

This simple method of contemplation outlined by Ludolph and set out in Vita Christi, in many of his commentaries on the gospel stories that he chooses it can be argued influenced the Spiritual Exercises of St Ignatius of Loyola. Indeed, it is said that St Ignatius had desired to become a Carthusian after his pilgrimage to Jerusalem, but was dissuaded by a Carthusian Prior. To this day members of the Society of Jesus may enter a Charterhouse, and if a vocation there does not work out, they may return to the Society of Jesus without penalty. This closeness between the Carthusians and Jesuits is arguably due to the great influence of Ludolph of Saxony's De Vita Christi on the future founder of the Society of Jesus.

Michael Foss is dismissive of the influence of Ludolph on the Exercises of St Ignatius, saying "The Exercises show a bit of Ludolph." Then, writing of St Ignatius, recovering from the cannon-ball wound at the Castle of Loyola, Foss says, "Bored, as only a man of action can be when driven to bed, he was driven by desperation to a few unappetising volumes that the Castle of Loyola offered. He found a Castilian translation of the long, worthy and popular Life of Christ by a certain Ludolph of Saxony, a 14th Century writer." More recently, Emily Ransom has argued for the centrality of the Vita for Ignatian spirituality, even going so far as to call the Exercises "a systematization of the affective method that Ignatius encountered in the Vita." Ludolph's importance to St. Ignatius is also explored by George Ganns, S.J., in his General Introduction to the volume of the Classics of Western Spirituality devoted to St. Ignatius, and is the subject of an article by Paul Shore, S. J.

== Modern Editions ==
Father Henry James Coleridge, SJ, a grand-nephew of Samuel Taylor Coleridge, in his article of 1872, in the "Review of Famous Books" section of The Month, urges future translators of the Vita Christi to be cautious with the Folio edition published by Palme in 1865 since it is marred by poor punctuation, and based on a poor manuscript.

The entire work has been translated into English from the 1870 Rigollot edition by Milton Walsh, and the four volumes were published by Cistercian Publications, 2018-2022. Various portions of the work have been translated over the years. The meditations of the Hours of the Passion were translated by Henry James Coleridge in 1887. The Prologue was translated by Milton Walsh, and Walsh's translation of the Easter Meditations appeared in 2016 from Cistercian Publications The prayers have been translated twice: first, by H Kyneston in 1908, and second, by Sister Mary Immaculate Bodenstedt in 1973.

== See also ==
- The Imitation of Christ

== Resources ==
- Vita Christi, Ludolphus de Saxonia (Archiginnasio Municipal Library)
