= Lila (Hinduism) =

Sanskrit word, "divine play"

Lila (Sanskrit: लीला līlā) or leela (/ˈliːlə/) can be loosely translated as "divine play". The concept of lila asserts that creation, instead of being an objective for achieving any purpose, is rather an outcome of the playful nature of the divine. As the divine is perfect, it could have no want fulfilled, thereby signifying freedom, instead of necessity, behind the creation.

The concept of lila is common to both non-dualist and dualist philosophical schools of Indian philosophy, but has a markedly different significance in each. Within non-dualism, lila is a way of describing all reality, including the cosmos, as the outcome of creative play by the divine absolute (Brahman). In Vaishnavism, lila refers to the activities of God and devotee, as well as the macrocosmic actions of the manifest universe.

== Translation ==
There are multiple theories about the derivation of lila. It may be derived from the Sanskrit root lal, which suggests playfulness of children or someone delicate.

According to Edwin Bryant, lila cannot be translated as "sport" or "game", since those words suggest a motivation of competition. In contrast, lila is "pure play, or spontaneous pastime", which has no purpose other than experiencing joy.

C. L. Tripathi describes lila as an emanation – creation is not a physical process, but akin to an overflow from the Good.

== Appearance in texts ==
Lila first appears in the Brahmasūtra 2.1.33 as "lokavat tu līlākaivalyam" "लोकवत्तु, लीलाकैवल्यम्", (However, [it is] but līlā, as [occurs] in daily experience.) This sutra responds to the objection that Brahman is not the cause of the world because causation requires motive. The reason given is that Brahman's act of creation is lila, in the same way lila takes place in the world. Shankara, in his commentary, likens Brahman to a king whose needs have been fulfilled, but engages in recreational activity. In another comparison, he says that it is Brahman's nature to create freely as it is our nature to inhale and exhale. Further, lila is not a necessary attribute of Brahman i.e. Brahman does not have to engage in lila.

In Vaishnavism, lila refers to the activities of God and his devotee, as well as the macrocosmic actions of the manifest universe, as seen in Srimad Bhagavatam, verse 3.26.4:

sa eṣa prakṛtiḿ sūkṣmāḿ
daivīḿ guṇamayīḿ vibhuḥ
yadṛcchayaivopagatām
abhyapadyata līlayā

"As his pastimes, that Supreme Divine Personality, the greatest of the great, accepted the subtle material energy which is invested with three material modes of nature."

Per the Bhagavata, the highest form of liberation is participation in Krishna's lila. The Bhagavata states that God does not descend on the earth because he needs to, but because it is an overflow of joy. It notes that hearing and remembering Krishna's lilas is the foremost way of doing yoga.

== Interpretations ==
Samkara argues that Brahman does not create with a self-serving motivation because it is lila, like naturally breathing in and out. Samkara uses the analogy of a king engaged in a game. While the act is conscious and premeditated, it does not have an ulterior motive. However, an act that is lila still involves responsibility, for which God implements the principle of karma. Samkara sees Brahman's lila through individual souls as only containing imagined suffering.

Lila indicates a spontaneous sportive activity of Brahman as distinguished from a self-conscious volitional effort. The concept of Lila signifies freedom as distinguished from necessity.

— Ram Shanker Misra, The Integral Advaitism of Sri Aurobindo

For Ramanuja, while lila does not entail an ulterior motive, it is not a necessary to Brahman. Lila includes God manifesting as an avatara for the benefit of individuals, and so is premeditated.

The relation of Purusa to Prakrti—the unfolding force of nature—becomes here a relation of male to female. This is expressed in the Siva temple in the core image of the sivalinga, an expression of male (linga) and female (yoni) union. The basic cosmogonic motif of an unfolding or flowering cosmos is expressed here specifically in the relation of male to female, as well as in terms of consciousness and intentionality (in the concept of lila as the divine play of male and female). As such, the core saivite image of cosmogony as the flowering of consciousness and sexual union rather than the sacrificial act. This theme resonates with other Hindu doctrines, such as Tantra and Sakta.

— Heinrich Zimmer and Joseph Campbell, Philosophies of India

The Vedantic yogi never tires of stating that kaivalya, "isolation-integration", can be attained only by turning away from the distracting allure of the world and worshiping with single-pointed attention the formless Brahman-Atman; to the Tantric, however—as to the normal child of the world—this notion seems pathological, the wrong-headed effect of a certain malady of intellect. (...) "I like eating sugar," as Ramprasad said, "but I have no desire to become sugar." Let those who suffer from the toils of samsara seek release: the perfect devotee does not suffer; for he can both visualize and experience life and the universe as the revelation of that Supreme Divine Force (shakti) with which he is in love, the all-comprehensive Divine Being in its cosmic aspect of playful, aimless display (lila)—which precipitates pain as well as joy, but in its bliss transcends them both.

— Rohan Bastin, The Domain of Constant Excess: Plural Worship at the Munnesvaram Temples in Sri Lanka

The basic recurring theme in Hindu mythology is the creation of the world by the self-sacrifice of God—"sacrifice" in the original sense of "making sacred"—whereby God becomes the world which, in the end, becomes again God. This creative activity of the Divine is called lila, the play of God, and the world is seen as the stage of the divine play. Like most of Hindu mythology, the myth of lila has a strong magical flavour. Brahman is the great magician who transforms himself into the world and then performs this feat with his "magic creative power", which is the original meaning of maya in the Rig Veda. The word maya—one of the most important terms in Indian philosophy—has changed its meaning over the centuries. From the might, or power, of the divine actor and magician, it came to signify the psychological state of anybody under the spell of the magic play. As long as we confuse the myriad forms of the divine lila with reality, without perceiving the unity of Brahman underlying all these forms, we are under the spell of maya. (...) In the Hindu view of nature, then, all forms are relative, fluid and ever-changing maya, conjured up by the great magician of the divine play. The world of maya changes continuously, because the divine lila is a rhythmic, dynamic play. The dynamic force of the play is karma, an important concept of Indian thought. Karma means "action". It is the active principle of the play, the total universe in action, where everything is dynamically connected with everything else. In the words of the Gita Karma is the force of creation, wherefrom all things have their life.

— Fritjof Capra, The Tao of Physics (1975)

== Practices ==
During raslila plays, human actors re-enact Krishna and Rama's divine play to remember the deities and experience their presence.

In Pushtimarga worship, devotees experience the sentiments of lila through practices such as adorning the image of Krishna, singing devotional songs, and offering food.

Gaudiya Vaisnavas practice lilasmarana, or visualization of Krishna's lilas. According to a Gaudiya interpretation of the Bhagavat Purana, Krishna's lilas on earth are a manifest counterpart to his unmanifest eternal lila in his abode.

== Other uses ==
Lila is comparable to the Western theological position of Pandeism, which describes the Universe as God taking a physical form in order to experience the interplay between the elements of the Universe.

"The Lila Solution" is a proposed answer to the problem of evil. It suggests that God cannot be blamed for sufferings because God is simply playing without any motivation. Lipner argues that since God is not "playful" by nature, but effortlessly acts as such, God maintains the law of karma and rebirth even while playing.

Biologist Brian Goodwin suggested that the concept of lila could be helpful to self-organizing complexity theorists. Christian theologian Arthur Peacocke has used lila to explain theistic interpretations of Darwinian evolution.

== See also ==
- Avatar
- Ludus amoris, western mystical conception of divine play
- The Mysterious Pastimes of Mohini Murti
- Radha Ramana
- Ramlila
- Rasa lila
- Trimurti (Brahma, Vishnu, Shiva)
