= Speculum spiritualium =

Speculum spiritualium (The Spiritual Mirror) is an anonymous religious compilation written in Latin, made between 1400 and 1430. The work was relatively popular, known in at least a dozen manuscripts, and printed by Wynkyn de Worde in 1510.

== Authorship ==
The book is believed to be the work of a Carthusian monk. It has been the subject of many conjectural attributions. An index to the catalogue of Syon Abbey made by Thomas Betson around 1504 (though he based his work on earlier materials) attributes Speculum spiritualium to 'Adam monachus Cartusiensis' (not the same as Adam of Dryburgh); hence John Bale called the author of the book 'Adam the Carthusian', attributing four other works to this identity, all of which are now known to be the work of other writers. Henry de Balnea was invented by Thomas Tanner as another author for the work.

The author quotes Walter Hilton repeatedly, and refers to him as 'uenerabilis', implying the work was composed after his death in 1396. There are three known English Carthusians named Adam who lived in the early fifteenth century: Adam the prior of Hinton Priory (died 1400/1); Adam Cantwell, a monk of Hinton (died 1419/20); and Adam Horsley, monk of Beauvale Priory (died in 1424/25). Adam Horsley is thought to be the most plausible identification, since he is known to have been acquainted with Walter Hinton. Walter addressed his Epistola aurea, quoted in the Speculum, to this Adam.
