= Leo Sherley-Price =

British clergyman & Royal Navy chaplain (1911–1998)

Lionel Digby (Leo) Sherley-Price (1911–1998) was a Church of England clergyman and Oblate of Saint Benedict who translated medieval Christian literature for the Penguin Classics series.

== Life ==
Sherley-Price was a student at Sidney Sussex College, Cambridge, graduating Bachelor of Arts in 1932, and went on to study at Chichester Theological College in 1933. In 1935 he was ordained as an Anglican priest. In 1936 he graduated Master of Arts and was commissioned as a chaplain in the Royal Navy. From 1937 to 1939 he went to China as chaplain aboard the aircraft carrier HMS Eagle, an experience that influenced his 1951 book Confucius and Christ. In November 1942 he was transferred to HMS Unicorn.

From 1963 to 1969 Sherley-Price was rector of Thurlestone and from 1965 to 1969 rural dean of Woodleigh, Devon. In 1969 he became vicar of Dawlish in the same county. From 1974 to 1978 he was incumbent at Manaton and North Bovey. He relinquished his commission as a Royal Navy reserve chaplain in 1977. He retired from full-time ministry in 1978. In 1985 he celebrated 50 years as an Anglican priest. His wife, Nora, died on 7 December 1995. He died at Bovey Tracey hospital on 1 November 1998.

== Writings ==
=== As author ===
- Saints of England (Church Literature Association, 1936)
- Confucius and Christ: A Christian Estimate of Confucius (Dacre Press, 1951)

=== As translator ===
- Little Flowers of Saint Francis (Penguin Books, 1951)
- Thomas à Kempis, The Imitation of Christ (Penguin Books, 1952)
- Bede, A History of the English Church and People (Penguin Books, 1955)
- Walter Hilton, The Ladder of Perfection (Penguin Books, 1957)
- Lent with Saint Francis: Readings from Early Franciscan Literature (Mowbray, 1958)
- Francis of Assisi, S. Francis of Assisi: His Life and Writings as Recorded by His Contemporaries (Mowbray, 1959)
- Julian of Norwich, Lent with Mother Julian: Reading from her "Revelations of divine love" (Mowbray, 1962)
- Thomas of Eccleston, The Coming of the Franciscans (Mowbray, 1964)
