= Ludolph of Saxony =

14th-century German theologian

Philosophical work
- Era: Renaissance philosophy
- Region: Western philosophy
- Institutions: Carthusians

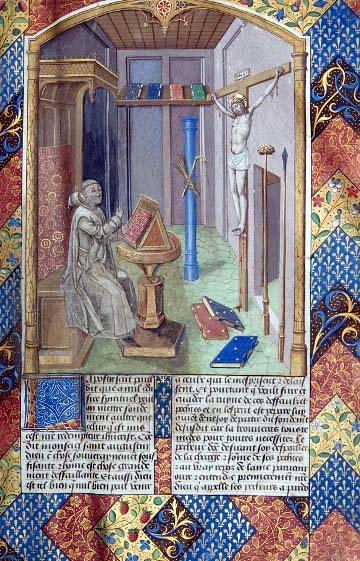
Vita Christi Vol. 1, folio

Ludolph of Saxony (c. 1295 – 1378), also known as Ludolphus de Saxonia and Ludolph the Carthusian, was a German Roman Catholic theologian of the fourteenth century.

His principal work, first printed in the 1470s, was the Vita Christi (Life of Christ). It had significant influence on the development of techniques for Christian meditation by introducing the concept of immersing and projecting oneself into a biblical scene portraying the life of Jesus, which became popular among the Devotio Moderna community and later influenced Ignatius of Loyola.

== Biography ==
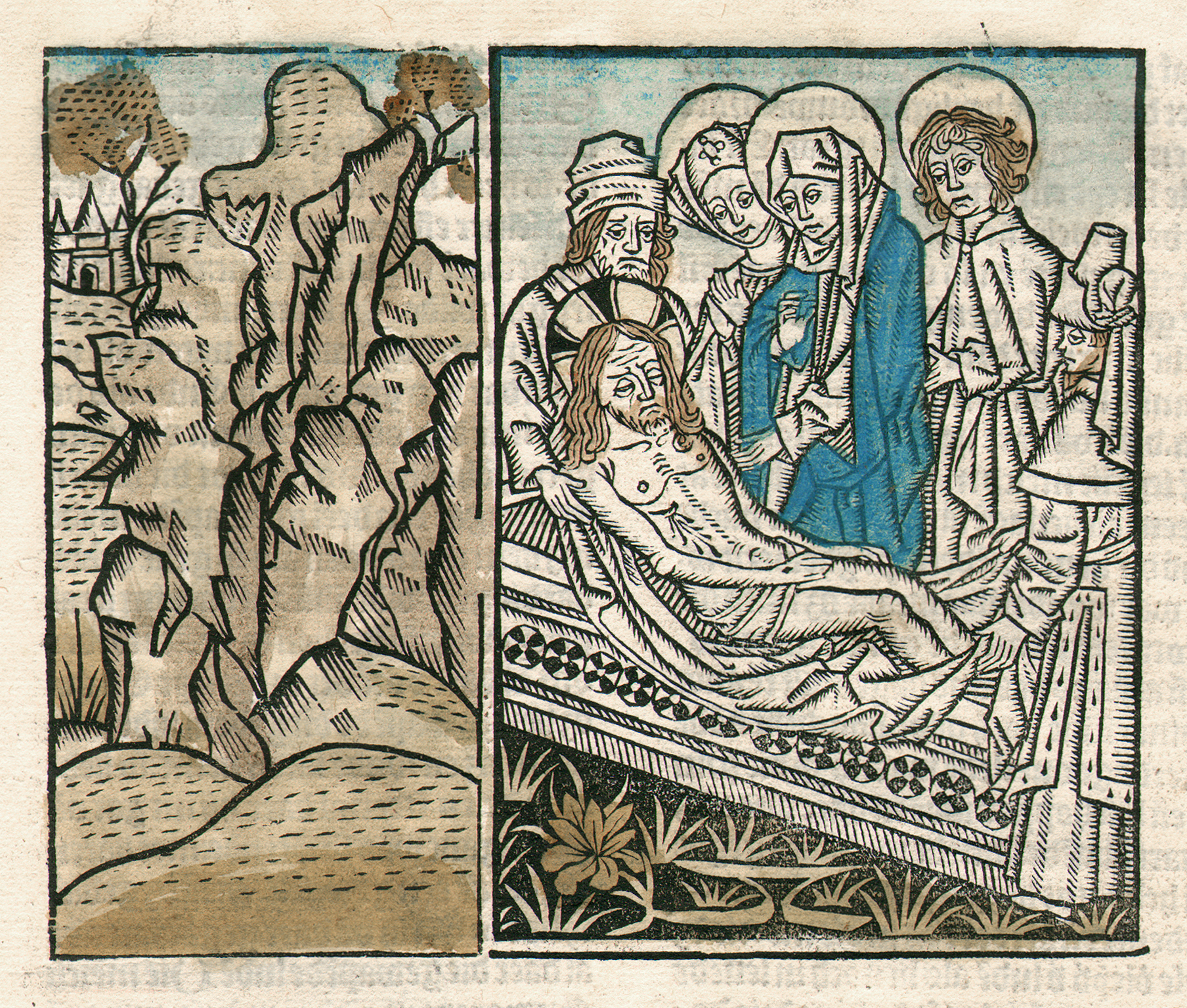
Vita Christi 1487, woodcut, watercolor

Little is known about Ludolph of Saxony's life. He may have been born about 1295, but this is uncertain. We have no certain knowledge of his native country; for in spite of his surname, "of Saxony", he may well, as Jacques Échard remarks, have been born either in the Diocese of Cologne or in the Diocese of Mainz, which then belonged to the province of Saxony. He first joined the Dominicans, possibly in about 1310, passed through an excellent course of literary and theological studies, and may have learnt the science of the spiritual life at the school of Johannes Tauler and Henry Suso, his contemporaries and companions in religion.

After about thirty years spent in the active life, he was in 1340 given permission to become a Carthusian, on the grounds that he felt a calling to the stricter life of silence and solitude practiced by that order; in that year he entered the Charterhouse (Carthusian monastery) of Strasburg. Three years later he was called upon to govern the newly founded (1331) Charterhouse of Koblenz; but scruples of conscience led him to resign his office of prior in 1348. Having again become a simple monk, first at Mainz and afterwards at Strasburg, he spent the last thirty years of his life in retreat and prayer, and died on 13 April 1378 an octogenarian, universally esteemed for his sanctity, although he never seems to have been honoured with any public cult.

== Works ==
Ludolph is principally remembered for two works:

- A Commentary upon the Psalms, concise but excellent for its method, clearness and solidity. He especially developed the spiritual sense, according to the interpretations of Jerome, Augustine of Hippo, Cassiodorus and Peter Lombard. This commentary, which was very popular in Germany in the Middle Ages, has passed through numerous editions, of which the first dates from 1491, and that of Montreuil-sur-Mer is from 1891.
- The Vita Christi, his principal work, is not a simple biography, but a history, a commentary on the Gospels with large texts borrowed from the Fathers, a series of dogmatic and moral dissertations, of spiritual instructions, meditations and prayers, in relation to the life of Christ, from birth to his Ascension. It has been called a summa evangelica, so popular at that time, in which the author has condensed and resuméd all that over sixty writers had said before him upon spiritual matters.

It is possible that Ludolph also wrote the Speculum Humanae Salvationis. Other treatises and sermons now either lost or very doubtful have also been attributed to him.

== Influence ==
At times, the Imitation of Christ has been attributed to Ludolph of Saxony. The 1913 Catholic Encyclopedia assesses this attribution as mistaken, but agrees that the Imitation draws on Ludolph's thought.

Pope Francis sees Ludolph's work as influencing the development of devotion to the Sacred Heart of Jesus within monastic settings, in advance of its wider permeation throughout the Catholic church.

== Resources ==
- Vita Christi, Ludolphus de Saxonia (Archiginnasio Municipal Library)
- Vita Christi at Google Books
