= Philip Krey =

Former seminary president

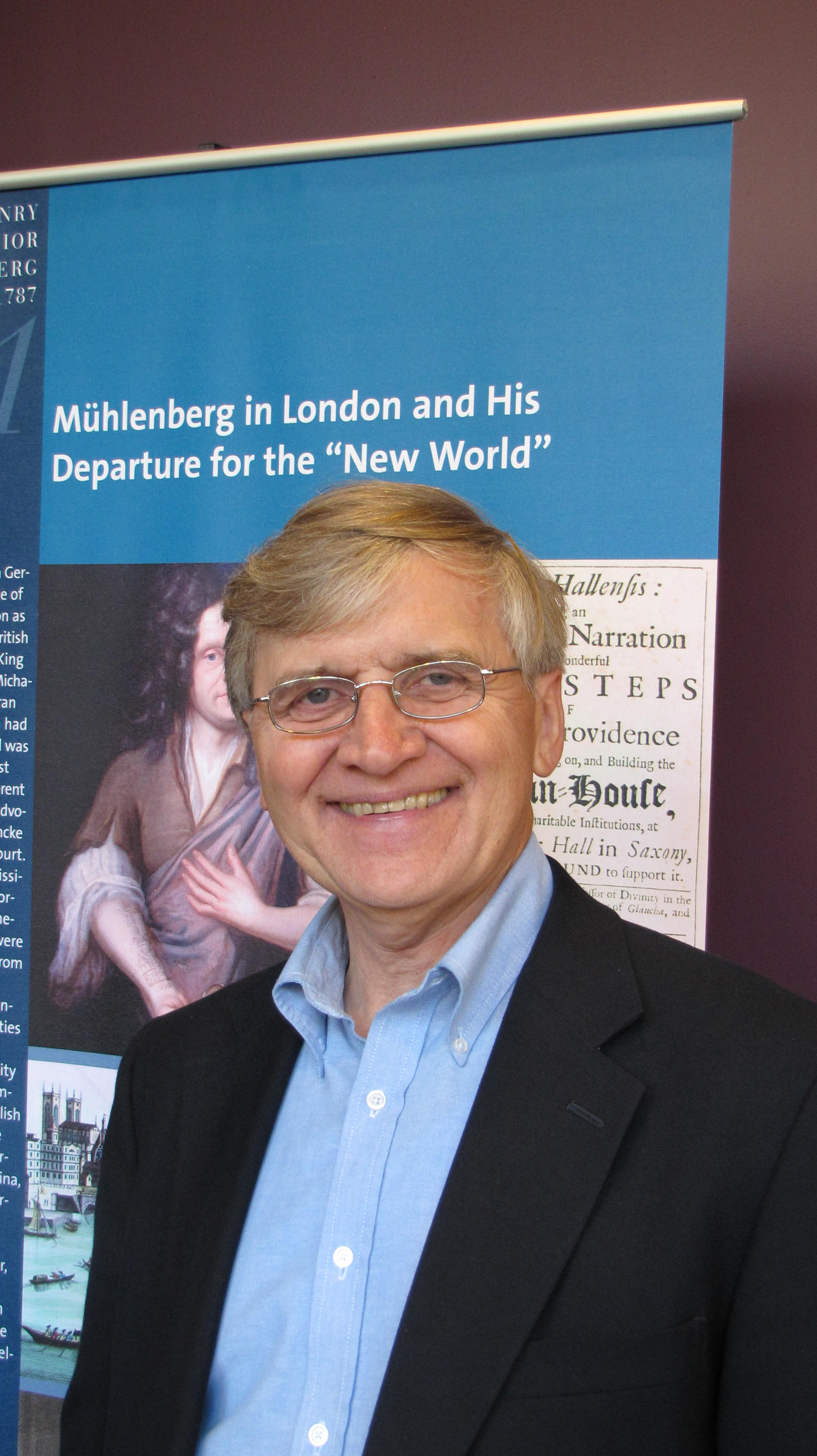
Philip Krey

Philip D. W. Krey (born May 1, 1950) is the former president of the Lutheran Theological Seminary at Philadelphia. He was born in Brooklyn (New York) and was ordained a minister of the Lutheran Church in America.

Krey has degrees from the University of Massachusetts Boston, the Lutheran Theological Seminary at Gettysburg, the Catholic University of America, and the University of Chicago. He was also a Fulbright Fellow at LMU Munich. Krey's research interests include the history of biblical interpretation, medieval theology, and urban ministry.

Krey is the author of ten non-fiction books and is now pastor of St. Andrews Lutheran Church in Perkasie, Pennsylvania.

== Non-fiction ==
- For All The Saints (Rejoice) 1991
- Nicholas of Lyra's Apocalypse Commentary (Eastman Studies in Music) (1997)
- A Seminary in Mission for a Church in Mission: Reflections as a Presidency Begins (2000)
- Nicholas of Lyra: The Senses of Scripture (Studies in the History of Christian Thought) (2000)
- Hebrews (Ancient Christian Commentary on Scripture) (2005)
- Luther's Spirituality (Classics of Western Spirituality) (2007)
- The Letter to the Romans (The Bible in Medieval Tradition (BMT)) (2013)
- The Catholic Luther: His Early Writings (2016)
- Romans 9-16 (Reformation Commentary on Scripture) (2016)
- Reformation Observances: 1517-2017 (2017)
