= Henry Suso =

German Dominican friar and writer (1295–1366)

Blessed Henry Suso OP
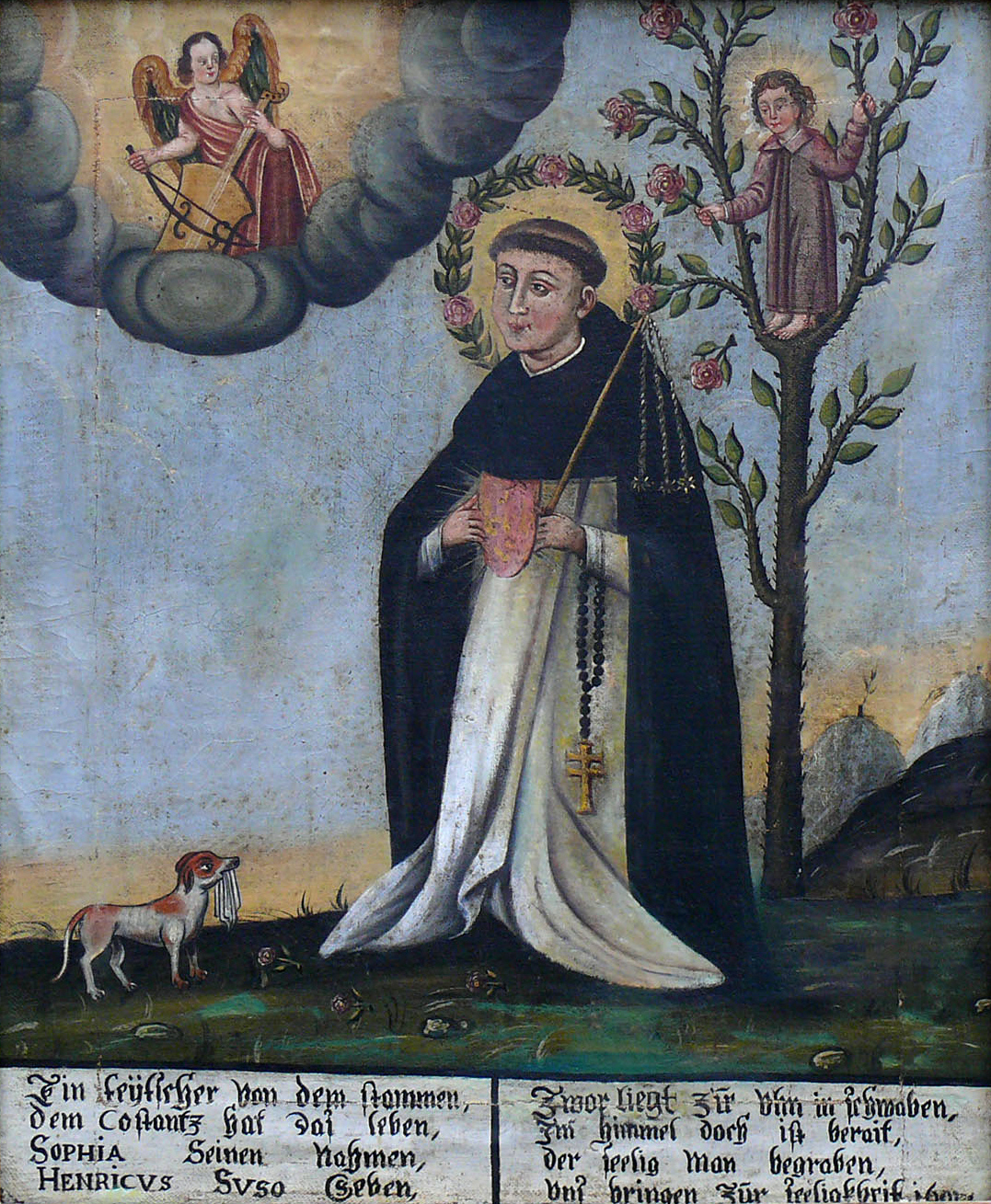

Religious, priest and mystic
- Born: 21 March 1295; Free Imperial City of Überlingen, Holy Roman Empire
- Died: 25 January 1366 (aged 70); Free Imperial City of Ulm, Holy Roman Empire
- Venerated in: Catholic Church
- Beatified: 22 April 1831, Saint Peter's Basilica, Papal States by Pope Gregory XVI
- Feast: 25 January (previously 2 March)
- Influences: Meister Eckhart

Henry Suso, OP (also called Amandus, a name adopted in his writings, and Heinrich Seuse or Heinrich von Berg in German; 21 March 1295 – 25 January 1366) was a German Dominican friar and the most popular vernacular writer of the fourteenth century (when considering the number of surviving manuscripts). An important author in both Latin and Middle High German, he is also notable for defending Meister Eckhart's legacy after Eckhart was posthumously condemned for heresy in 1329. He died in Ulm on 25 January 1366, and was beatified by the Catholic Church in 1831.

== Biography ==
Suso was born Heinrich von Berg, a member of the ruling family of Berg. He was born in either the free imperial city of Überlingen on Lake Constance or nearby Constance, on 21 March 1295 (or perhaps on that date up to 1297–99). Later, out of humility and devotion to his mother, he took her family name, which was Sus (or Süs, meaning "sweet"). At 13 years of age he was admitted to the novitiate of the Dominican Order at their priory in Constance. After completing that year of probation, he advanced to do his preparatory, philosophical, and theological studies there.

In the prologue to his Life, Suso recounts how, after about five years in the monastery (in other words, when he was about 18 years old), he experienced a conversion to a deeper form of religious life through the intervention of Divine Wisdom. He made himself "the Servant of Eternal Wisdom", which he identified with the divine essence and, in more specific terms, with divine Eternal Wisdom made man in Christ. From this point forward in his account of his spiritual life, a burning love for Eternal Wisdom dominated his thoughts and controlled his actions; his spiritual journey culminated in a mystical marriage to Christ in the form of the Eternal Wisdom, an allegorical Goddess in the Hebrew Bible associated with Christ in medieval devotion.

=== Career ===
Suso was then sent on for further studies in philosophy and theology, probably first at the Dominican monastery in Strasbourg, perhaps between 1319 and 1321, and then from 1324 to 1327 he took a supplementary course in theology in the Dominican Studium Generale in Cologne, where he would have come into contact with Meister Eckhart, and probably also Johannes Tauler, both celebrated mystics.

Returning to his home priory at Constance in about 1327, Suso was appointed to the office of lector (lecturer). His teaching, however, aroused criticism – most likely because of his connection with Eckhart in the wake of the latter's trial and condemnation in 1326–29. Suso's Little Book of Truth, a short defence of Eckhart's teaching, probably dates from this time, perhaps 1329. In 1330 this treatise, and another, were denounced as heretical by enemies in the Order. Suso traveled to the Dominican General Chapter held at Maastricht in 1330 to defend himself. The outcome is not entirely clear. At some point between 1329 and 1334 he was removed from his lectorship in Constance, though he was not personally condemned.

Knowledge of Suso's activities in subsequent years is somewhat sketchy. It is known that he served as prior of the Constance convent – most likely between 1330 and 1334, though possibly in the 1340s. It is also known that he had various devoted disciples, a group including both men and women, especially those connected to the Friends of God movement. His influence was especially strong in many religious communities of women, particularly in the Dominican Monastery of St. Katharinental in the Thurgau, a famous nursery of mysticism in the 13th and 14th centuries. In the mid-1330s, during his visits to various communities of Dominican nuns and Beguines, Suso became acquainted with Elsbeth Stagel, prioress of the monastery of Dominican nuns in Töss. The two became close friends. She translated some of his Latin writings into German, collected and preserved most of his extant letters, and at some point began gathering the materials that Suso eventually put together into his Life of the Servant.

Suso shared the exile of the Dominican community from Constance between 1339 and 1346, during the most heated years of the quarrel that began between Pope John XXII and Louis IV, Holy Roman Emperor which was continued by Pope Benedict XII. Suso was transferred to the monastery at Ulm in about 1348. He seems to have remained there for the rest of his life. Here, during his final years (possibly 1361–63), he edited his four vernacular works into The Exemplar.

Suso died in Ulm on 25 January 1366.

=== Mortifications ===
Early in his life, Suso subjected himself to extreme forms of mortifications; later on he reported that God told him they were no longer necessary. During this period, Suso devised for himself several painful devices. Some of these were: an undergarment studded with a hundred and fifty brass nails, a very uncomfortable door to sleep on, and a cross with thirty protruding needles and nails under his body as he slept. In the autobiographical text in which he reports these, however, he ultimately concludes that they are unnecessary distractions from the love of God.

== Writings ==
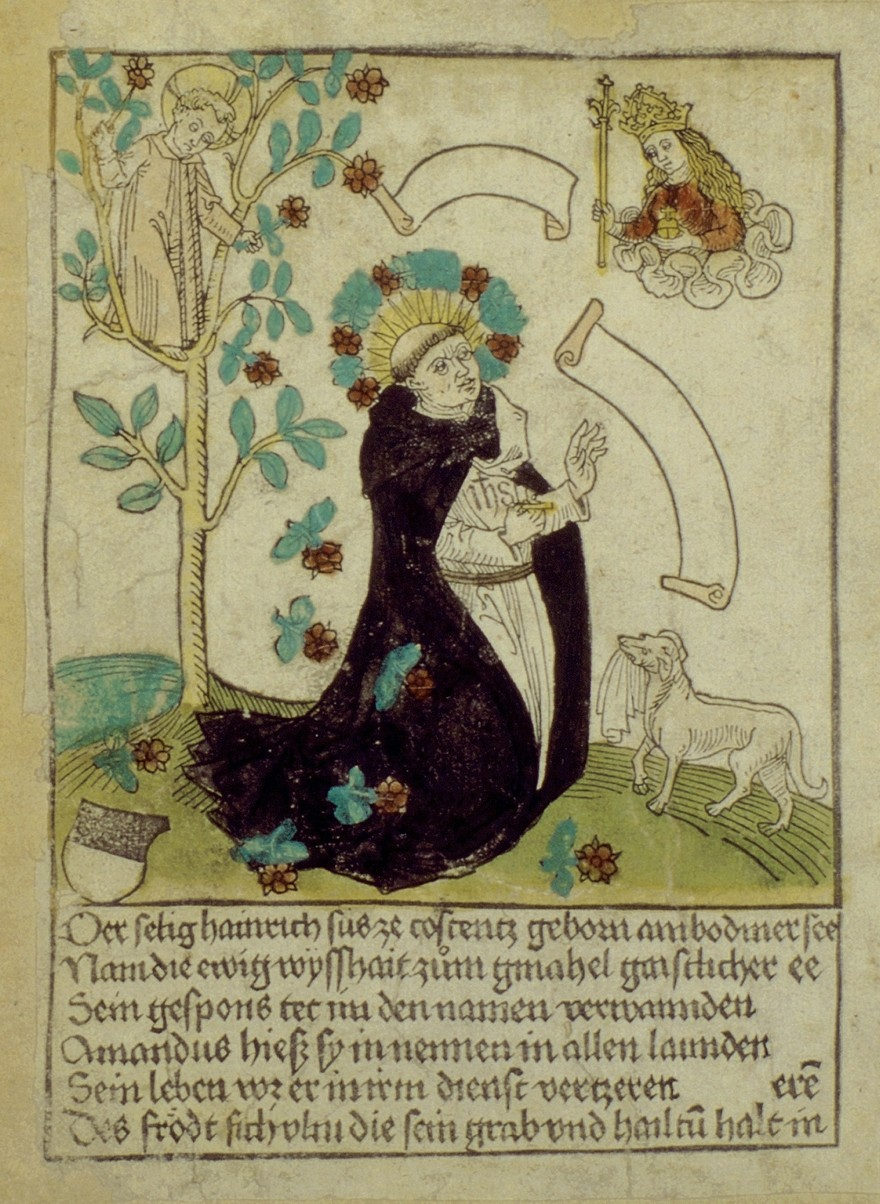
Bl. Henry Suso in Literature.

Suso's first work was the Büchlein der Wahrheit (Little Book of Truth) written between 1328 and 1334 in Constance. This was a short defence of the teaching of Meister Eckhart, who had been tried for heresy and condemned in 1328–29. In 1330 this treatise and another (possibly the Little Book of Eternal Wisdom) were denounced as heretical by Dominican opponents, leading Suso to travel to the Dominican General Chapter held at Maastricht in 1330 to defend himself.

Suso's next book, Das Büchlein der ewigen Weisheit (The Little Book of Eternal Wisdom), written around 1328–1330, is less speculative and more practical. At some point between 1334 and 1337 Suso translated this work into Latin, but in doing so added considerably to its contents, and made of it an almost entirely new book, which he called the Horologium Sapientiae (Clock of Wisdom). This book was dedicated to the new Dominican Master General, Hugh of Vaucemain, who appears to have been a supporter of his.

At some point in the following decades, Stagel formed a collection of 28 of Suso's letters in the Grosses Briefbuch (Great Book of Letters), which survives. Suso also wrote a long text purporting to tell the story of his spiritual life and ascetic practices (variously referred to as the Life of the Servant, Life, Vita, or Leben Seuses), and revised the Büchlein der Wahrheit and the Büchlein der ewigen Weisheit. At some point in his later years, perhaps 1361–63, he collected these works, together with 11 of his letters (the Briefbüchlein, or Little Book of Letters, a selection of letters from the Grosses Briefbuch), and wrote a prologue, to form one book he referred to as The Exemplar.

There are also various sermons attributed to Suso, although only two appear to be authentic. A treatise known as the Minnebüchlein (Little Book of Love) is sometimes, but probably incorrectly, attributed to Suso.

Suso was very widely read in the later Middle Ages. There are 232 extant manuscripts of the Middle High German Little Book of Eternal Wisdom. The Latin Clock of Wisdom was even more popular: over four hundred manuscripts in Latin, and over two hundred manuscripts in various medieval translations (it was translated into eight languages, including Dutch, French, Italian, Swedish, Czech, and English). Many early printings survive as well. The Clock was therefore second only to the Imitation of Christ in popularity among spiritual writings of the later Middle Ages. Among his many readers and admirers were Thomas à Kempis and John Fisher.

Wolfgang Wackernagel and others have called Suso a "Minnesinger in prose and in the spiritual order" or a "Minnesinger of the Love of God" both for his use of images and themes from secular, courtly, romantic poetry and for his rich musical vocabulary. The mutual love of God and man which is his principal theme gives warmth and color to his style. He used the full and flexible Alemannic idiom with rare skill, and contributed much to the formation of good German prose, especially by giving new shades of meaning to words employed to describe inner sensations.

== Legacy and veneration ==
In the world Suso was esteemed as a preacher, and was heard in the cities and towns of Swabia, Switzerland, Alsace, and the Netherlands. His apostolate, however, was not with the masses, but rather with individuals of all classes who were drawn to him by his singularly attractive personality, and to whom he became a personal director in the spiritual life.

Suso was reported to have established among the Friends of God a society which he called the Brotherhood of the Eternal Wisdom. The so-called Rule of the Brotherhood of the Eternal Wisdom is but a free translation of a chapter of his Horologium Sapientiae and did not make its appearance until the fifteenth century.

Suso was beatified in 1831 by Pope Gregory XVI, who assigned 2 March as his feast day, celebrated within the Dominican Order. The Dominicans now celebrate his feast on 23 January, the feria, or "free" day, nearest the day of his death.

The words of the Christmas song "In dulci jubilo" are attributed to Suso.

== Editions and translations ==
The Exemplar (Middle High German):

- Henry Suso, Das Buch von dem Diener (The Life of the Servant), ed. K. Bihlmeyer, Heinrich Seuse. Deutsche Schriften, 1907

(translated by Frank Tobin, in The Exemplar, with Two German Sermons, New York: Paulist Press, 1989, pp. 61–204)

- Das Büchlein der ewigen Weisheit (The Little Book of Eternal Wisdom), ed. K. Bihlmeyer, ibid.

(trans. in F. Tobin, ibid., pp. 204–304)

- Das Büchlein der Wahrheit (The Little Book of Truth), ed. K. Bihlmeyer, ibid.

(trans. in F. Tobin, ibid., pp. 305–332)

- Das Briefbüchlein (The Little Book of Letters), ed. K. Bihlmeyer, ibid., pp. 360–393

(trans. in F. Tobin, ibid., pp. 333–360)

- "The exemplary life and writings of Blessed Henry Suso, Complete ed. based on manuscripts, with a critical introd. & explanatory notes by Nicholas Heller

(translated from the German by Sister M. Ann Edward (Sister Mary of the Immaculate Heart). 2 v. (c) Priory Press; 15 Apr 1962)

- Exemplar, A complete and illustrated (bilingual) Dutch translation. Seusewerken.freens.eu

(translated from the Middle High German by Peter Freens; with illustrations by Anna Ruiters).

Preaching and Letters (Middle High German):

- Henry Suso, The Great Book of Letters, ed. K. Bihlmeyer, Heinrich Seuse. Deutsche Schriften, 1907, pp. 405–494
- Sermons 1 and 4 (those now recognized as authentic) are published in English translation in The Exemplar, with Two German Sermons

(trans. F. Tobin, (New York: Paulist Press, 1989), pp. 361–376)

Latin:

- Henry Suso, Horologium sapientiae (Clock of Wisdom), ed. P. Künzle, Heinrich Seuses Horologium sapientiae, Freiburg: Universitatsverlag, 1977

(translated by Edmund Colledge, Wisdom's Watch upon the Hours, Catholic University of America Press [1994])

- Heinrich Seuse, De Klok van de Wijsheid (Horologium Sapientiae). A complete (bilingual) Dutch translation (translated from the Medieval Latin by Peter Freens, 2023). SeuseWerken.freens.eu

== Memory ==
Croatian writer Sida Košutić wrote novel in a form of hagiography devoted to him, Sluga Vječne Mudrosti ("Servant of Eternal Wisdom", 1930), in which she depicts him as a Servant, Poet and the Sufferer.

== See also ==
- Ludus amoris
