= Elsie McKee =

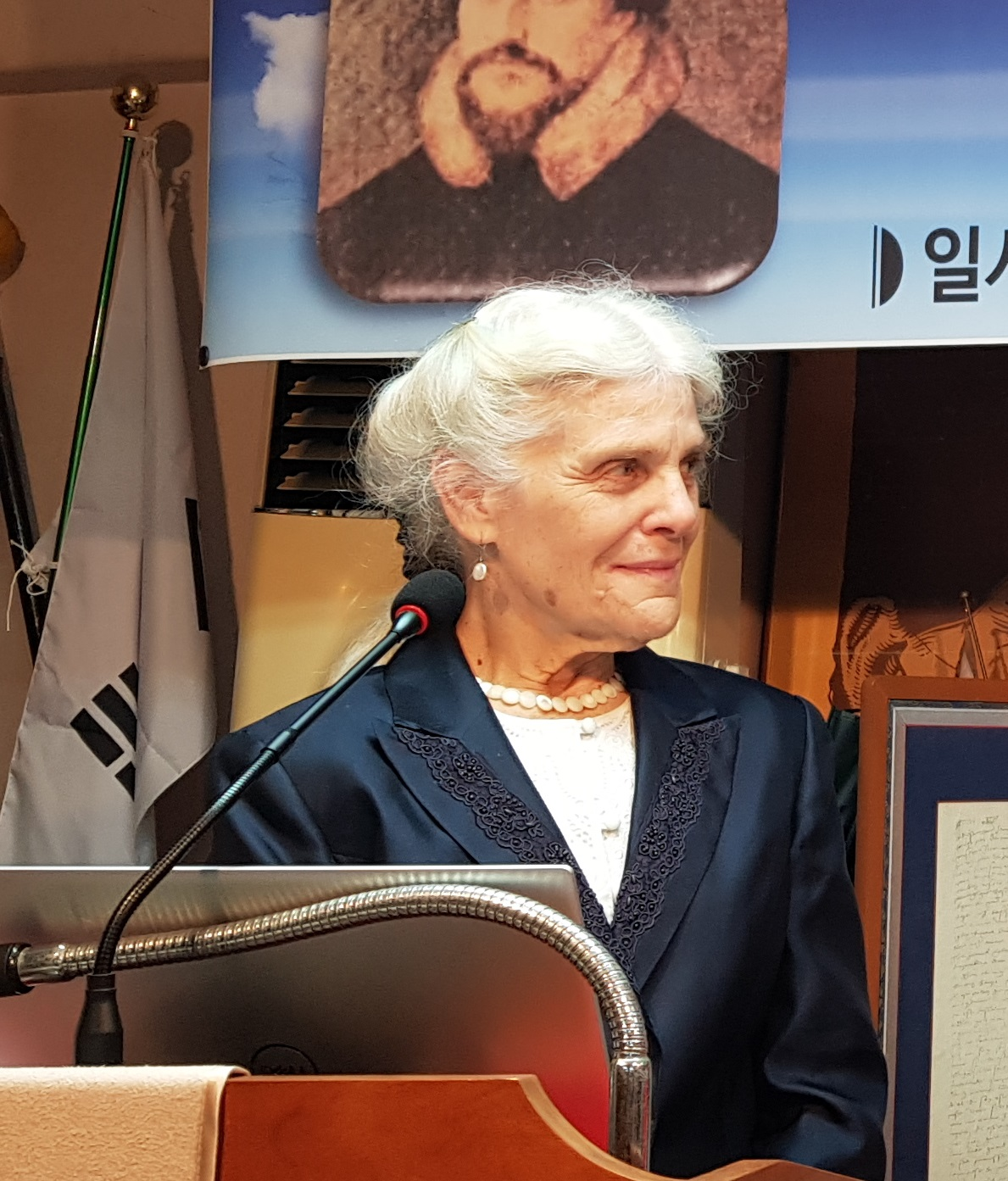
- Prof. Elsie Anne McKee, 27th Oct. 2022, Institutes for Calvinistic Studies in Korea
- Known for: Study of John Calvin and Katharina Zell

Academic background
- Education: Hendrix College, University of Cambridge, Princeton Theological Seminary

Elsie Anne Tshimunyi McKee is a retired professor of theology, the Archibald Alexander Professor of Reformation Studies and the History of Worship at Princeton Theological Seminary. She is known for her research of the doctrines of John Calvin and the work of Protestant reformer Katharina Schütz Zell.

McKee's grandparents moved to the Democratic Republic of the Congo in 1911 as missionaries. McKee was born and raised in the DRC until she moved to the United States to attend college.

McKee received a bachelor's degree from Hendrix College in 1973. She received her diploma in Theology from the University of Cambridge in 1974, and her Ph.D. from Princeton Theological Seminary in 1982.

McKee was granted a fellowship from the American Council of Learned Societies in 1986 for her project creating translations of John Calvin's sermons. Hendrix College awarded McKee the Odyssey Medal for research in 2014.

McKee retired from Princeton Theological Seminary in 2021, after 29 years of teaching there.

In 2021, McKee authored the preface for Cradling Abundance, the memoir of her friend Monique Misenga Ngoie Mukuna, aka Maman Monique, detailing the latter's life as an African Christian woman in the DRC.

External videos
- "Dr. Elsie McKee video from Adult Ed", March 23, 2022, St. Marks Episcopal Church

== Bibliography ==
- Cradling Abundance: One African Christian's Story of Empowering Women and Fighting Systemic Poverty. IVP Academic. 2021. ISBN 9780830852987. - Preface, with Monique Misenga Ngoie Mukuna
- The pastoral ministry and worship in Calvin's Geneva. Librairie Droz S.A. 2016. ISBN 9782600019620.
- Writings on pastoral piety. Paulist Press. 2001. ISBN 9780809140466. - Translation of John Calvin
- Katharina Schütz Zell / 1 : the life and thought of a sixteenth-century reformer. Brill. 1999. ISBN 9789004111257.
- Katharina Schütz Zell / 2 : The writings : a critical edition. Brill. 1999. ISBN 9789004111264.
- Reforming popular piety in sixteenth-century Strasbourg : Katharina Schütz Zell and her hymnbook. Princeton Theological Seminary. 1994. OCLC 33927790.
- Diakonia in the classical Reformed tradition and today. W.B. Eerdmans. 1989. ISBN 9780802803528.
- Elders and the plural ministry : the role of exegetical history in illuminating John Calvin's theology. Travaux d'humanisme et Renaissance. Librairie Droz S.A. 1988. OCLC 20998019.
- John Calvin : on the diaconate and liturgical almsgiving. Travaux d'humanisme et Renaissance. Librairie Droz S.A. 1984. OCLC 875295092.
