= Rosemary Dorward =

Translator of Middle English (1921 – 1998)

Rosemary Dorward (née Birts, 1921 – 1998) was a British translator of Middle English mystical texts.

Birts served with the WRNS during World War II, achieving the rank of Third Officer in January 1944.

She studied English Language and Literature as an Exhibition Scholar at St Hilda’s College, Oxford in 1945, under Dorothy Everett, Helen Gardner, and Dorothy Whitelock. She received a B.Litt for her work towards an edition of fourteenth-century mystic Walter Hilton’s Scale of Perfection, Book One, which had been started by Gardner.

In 1951, she married forestry worker Frank Dorward, and they moved to Africa, living in Tanzania, Malawi, and Swaziland. During this time Rosemary worked as a secondary school teacher. They had three sons.

She continued to work towards an edition of Scale of Perfection alongside Alan Bliss, and it was finally published in 1991. When she returned from Africa to live in the Scottish Borders, she produced other translations of Hilton’s work: Eight Chapters on Perfection and Angels’ Songs (published 1983) and Mixed Life (published posthumously in 2024).

She died on 26 June 1998.
