= Regis J. Armstrong =

American academic

Rev. Regis J. Armstrong, OFMCap is a Capuchin religious priest and a professor in the School of Religious Studies at The Catholic University of America.

He holds an M.Div. and an M.Th. from the Capuchin Theological Seminary, an M.S.Ed. from Iona College and a Ph.D from Fordham University.

He is an authority on Saint Francis of Assisi and Saint Clare of Assisi, who has authored nine books and many journal and encyclopedia articles as well as editing a number of other books.

== Works ==
- Francis and Clare: The Complete Writings (Translation with Ignatius Brady and Introduction )
- True Joy: The Wisdom of Francis and Clare (Translation with Ignatius Brady and Introduction )
- Clare of Assisi: Early Documents (Translation and Introduction)
- Towards the Discovery of Clare of Assisi, Volumes I, II, III, IV.
- St. Francis of Assisi: Writings for a Gospel Life
- Francis of Assisi: Early Documents, Volumes I, II, III, IV, Index (Translation)
- Bonaventure: The Enkindling of Love (Translation and Introduction)
- Constitutions of the Order of the Capuchin Friars Minor (Translation with critical apparatus and indices)
- Towards Renewal: The Documents of the Plenary Councils of the Capuchin Friars Minor (Translation with critical apparatus)
- Into God: Itinerarium Mentis in Deum of Saint Bonaventure. Catholic University of America Press, (2020).
