= Bernard McGinn (theologian) =

Theologian, historian, and scholar of spirituality

The Reverend Bernard McGinn
- Born: August 19, 1937
- Occupations: Professor (Emeritus), University of Chicago, Divinity School
- Notable work: The Presence of God
- Theological work
- Language: English
- Tradition or movement: Catholic

Bernard McGinn (born August 19, 1937) is an American Catholic theologian, religious historian, and scholar of spirituality. A specialist in medieval mysticism, McGinn is widely regarded as the preeminent scholar of mysticism in the Western Christianity. He is best known for his comprehensive series on mysticism, The Presence of God.

== Life ==
McGinn graduated cum laude from Saint Joseph's Seminary (Dunwoodie) in Yonkers, New York. In 1963, he earned a STL from the Gregorian University, and in 1970 a Ph.D. in history from Brandeis University, writing his dissertation on a twelfth-century Cistercian mystical author named Isaac of Stella. His areas of concentration are theology and Medieval intellectual history.

According to McGinn, "Even for people who may not have any religious commitment of their own, a study of the great mystics can reveal something about human creativity and genius." "McGinn is widely considered the preeminent scholar of mysticism in the Western Christian tradition and a leading authority on the theology of the 14th-century mystic Meister Eckhart".

McGinn taught for a year at the Catholic University of America before joining the faculty of the University of Chicago Divinity School, where he taught Historical Theology and the History of Christianity from 1969 to 2003. He was appointed to the Donnelley chair in 1992 and is the Naomi Shenstone Donnelley Professor Emeritus of Historical Theology and of the History of Christianity at the school and serves on the Committees on Medieval Studies and on General Studies at the University of Chicago.

From 1988 to 2015, McGinn was editor-in-chief of the Paulist Press Classics of Western Spirituality Series; he also served as a member of the editorial boards of Cistercian Publications, and other publications. In 2003, he co-wrote Early Christian Mystics: The Divine Vision of the Spiritual Masters with his wife, psychotherapist Pat McGinn. McGinn is a past-president of the American Society of Church History and the American Catholic Historical Association.

Although he assumed emeritus status in 2003, he has continued publishing scholarly work since that time. In 2005 he participated in a symposium on "Spiritual Information", sponsored by the John Templeton Foundation at Trinity College, Cambridge. In 2015, he gave the Costan Lecture at Georgetown University. In June of that same year, he spoke on Teresa of Avila at the "Agricola Seminar" of the University of Groningen. In 2017, McGinn spoke on John of the Cross for the Annual Candlemas Lecture at Boston College.

== Recognition ==
- Fellow of the Medieval Academy and the American Academy of Arts and Sciences
- Fellow of the American Academy of Arts and Sciences
- Fulbright-Hays Research Fellowship
- Lily Foundation Senior Research Fellowship (1993)
- Research fellowships for work at the Institute for Advanced Study at Hebrew University of Jerusalem
- Research fellowship at the Institute for Ecumenical and Culture Research at St. John's University
- Mellon Foundation Emeritus Grant

== Reviews ==
Writing in The Christian Century, Lawrence S. Cunningham said,

In terms of sheer scholarship, this series [the Presence of God] is the most important contribution to the field of theology in the past quarter century. McGinn takes readers from the biblical materials through the Western tradition to detect the ways in which classical spiritual texts give evidence of the experience of the presence of God. With four volumes in print and a fifth to come, McGinn's magisterial work is stunning in its sophisticated methodology and its close reading of texts. Both historical in approach and profoundly theological in presupposition, these volumes constitute a classic work that will not soon be overtaken.

Mary Frohlich, of the Catholic Theological Union said of The Flowering of Mysticism: Men and Women in the New Mysticism--1200-1350, "The third volume of Bernard McGinn's history of western Christian mysticism is, as usual for McGinn's work, stellar. Drawing on his exhaustive knowledge of history and theology, McGinn provides a magisterial interpretation of the context and trends of the "new mysticism" that began to appear in the thirteenth century .... Anyone in need of a concise but encyclopedic review of studies on aspects of mysticism during this period will do well to make this the first stop." She also noted, "... that this is most likely not the book to use as a course text in undergraduate or adult education settings. Its level of analysis and scholarship make it ideal for graduate courses, or as a recommended reference work for students researching specific figures or movements."

A review of The Varieties of Vernacular Mysticism: 1350–1550 in Religion and Theology said, "Bernard McGinn's monumental series on the history of Western Christian mysticism continues, here reaching its fifth highly impressive volume .... As in the previous volumes, the analysis is always lucid and extensive, a testament to McGinn's encyclopedic understanding of the writers located in the mystical tradition."

In reviewing Mysticism in the Golden Age of Spain (1500–1650), part 2 of volume 6 of The Presence of God, Harvey D. Egan wrote, "M[cGinn]’s synthetic-analytic prowess in delineating mystics in their historical context accounts for his volumes being definitive. If a manuscript dealing with the Western mystical tradition that I am requested to evaluate contains no evidence of M.’s work, I rarely suggest that it be published."

== Publications (selected) ==
The following volumes of McGinn's history of Christian mysticism, The Presence of God series, have so far been published:

- McGinn, Bernard (1991). The Foundations of Mysticism. New York: Crossroad. ISBN 0-8245-1121-2. OCLC 25839970. (494 pages)
- McGinn, Bernard (1994). The Growth of Mysticism. New York: Crossroad. ISBN 0-8245-1450-5. OCLC 247412043. (630 pages)
- McGinn, Bernard (1998). The Flowering of Mysticism: Men and Women in the New Mysticism (1200-1350). New York: Crossroad. ISBN 0-8245-1742-3. OCLC 38199636. ISBN 0-8245-1743-1 (paperback) (526 pages)
- McGinn, Bernard (2005). The Harvest of Mysticism in Medieval Germany (1300-1500). New York: Crossroad. ISBN 0-8245-2345-8. OCLC 162272507. (738 pages)
- McGinn, Bernard (2013). The Varieties of Vernacular Mysticism (1350-1550). New York: Crossroad. ISBN 978-0-8245-9901-0. OCLC 785874270. (864 pages)
- McGinn, Bernard (2017). Mysticism in the Reformation (1500-1650). New York: Crossroad. ISBN 9780824522308. OCLC 960089660. (350 pages; Part 1 of Volume 6 of Presence of God series)
- McGinn, Bernard (2017). Mysticism in the Golden Age of Spain (1500-1650). New York: Crossroad. ISBN 9780824500900. (500 pages; Part 2 of Volume 6 of Presence of God series)
- McGinn, Bernard (2020). The Persistence of Mysticism in Catholic Europe: France, Italy, and Germany 1500-1675. New York: Crossroad. ISBN 9780824589004. (500 pages; Part 3 of Volume 6 of Presence of God series)
- McGinn, Bernard (2021). The Crisis of Mysticism: Quietism in Seventeenth-Century Spain, Italy, and France. New York: Crossroad. ISBN 9780824504670. (400 pages; Volume 7 of Presence of God series)

Other books by McGinn include:

- The Essential Writings of Christian Mysticism, 2006
- McGinn, Bernard (2014). Thomas Aquinas's Summa Theologiae: A Biography. Princeton, NJ: Princeton University Press. ISBN 978-0691154268. OCLC 861542567. (260 pages)
