= Stimulus Amoris =

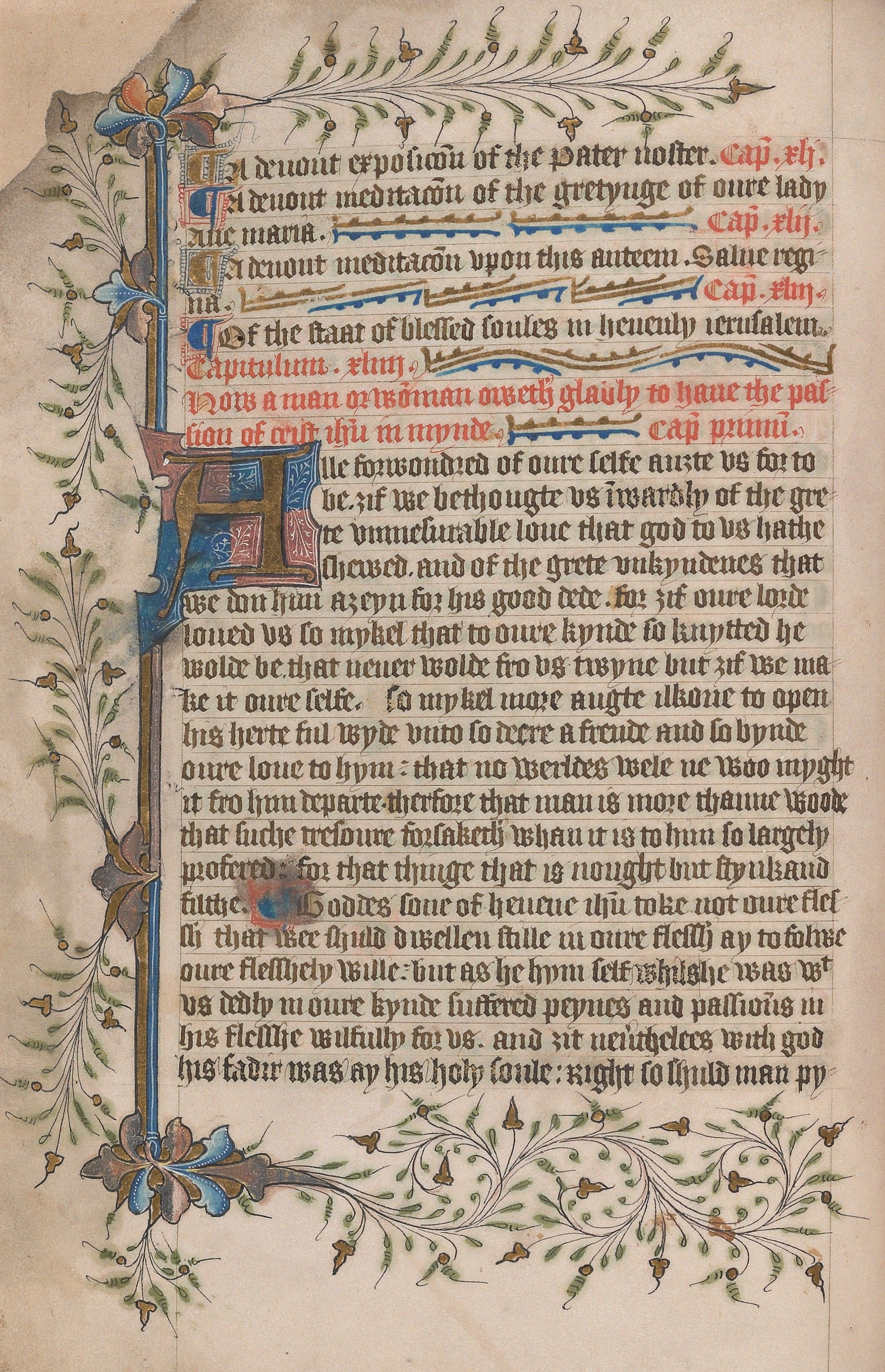
Start of the first chapter in a manuscript of Hilton's translation from 1400–1450

The Stimulus Amoris is a mystical treatise on love written by the Franciscan James of Milan in the late thirteenth century. The text was expanded after James's death, growing from twenty-three to fifty-three chapters by the early fourteenth century, and growing yet again in its 1476 and 1596 printings. There are at least six forms of the Latin text in existence. In its original version, it survives in ninety manuscripts. The early fourteenth century version, however, often called the Stimulus maior or Forma longa, exists in complete form in 221 manuscripts and partially in another 147.

It is the long text that provides the basis for the Middle English translation of Stimulus Amoris, entitled The Prickynge of Love, which was made around 1380, perhaps by Walter Hilton. The Prickynge of Love survives in sixteen manuscripts, eleven from the fifteenth century.

A version of the Stimulus Amoris also served as the source for the Middle French translation, L'Aguillon d'amour divine, by Simon de Courcy, a Franciscan friar and confessor of Marie de Berry, c. 1406.

The Stimulus Amoris was later translated again into English in Douai in 1642 by English recusants.

== Modern editions ==
- Stimulus Amoris [long text] [Attributed to Bonaventure], in Bonaventure, Opera Omnia, ed A. C. Peltier, 15 vols, (Paris: L Vivès, 1864–71), 12:288-291 and 631-703.
- James of Milan, Stimulus Amoris, Bibliotheca Franciscana Ascetica Medii Aevi IV, Quaracchi (Florence): Colegii S. Bonaventurae, 1949.
- The Goad of Love [attributed to Walter Hilton], translated by Clare Kirchberger, (London: Faber & Faber, 1952) [edited in a lightly modified English version from the Vernon manuscript]
- Prickynge of Love, ed. Harold Kane, 2 vols., (Salzburg: Institut für Anglistik und Amerikanistik der Universität Salzburg, 1983)
- JPH Clark, 'Walter Hilton and the Stimulus Amoris ', Downside Review 102, (1984), pp79–118.
