= Edmund Colledge =

British academic and priest

- Born: John Eric Colledge; 14 August 1910; North Shields, Northumberland
- Died: 16 November 1999 (aged 89); Deal, Kent
- Education: Liverpool University
- Scientific career
- Fields: Medieval literature
- Workplaces: Liverpool University; Pontifical Institute of Mediaeval Studies; Austin Friars St Monica's School

Edmund Colledge (14 August 1910 – 16 November 1999) was an English academic, military officer, and Roman Catholic priest. He is chiefly known for his scholarly publications on European medieval literature, in particular spiritual writers from that era. His 1962 anthology, The Medieval Mystics of England, is still widely used in university courses to this day. Chief among his works is his edition of A book of showings to the anchoress Julian of Norwich (published by the Pontifical Institute of Mediaeval Studies, Toronto, 1978) which he co-edited with James Walsh.

== Life and career ==
Born John Eric Colledge in Tynemouth, (Note: More precisely, Edmund Colledge, O. S. A., whose name in religion was adopted from Edmund Rich, was born in North Shields.) Northumberland, Colledge graduated with first class honours in English from Liverpool University (LU) in 1932. He later earned an MA from LU in 1935, and also served as an Assistant Lecturer in LU's Department of English Language and Philology from 1937 to 1939. One of his influential professors at LU was John Henry Grafton Grattan (15 September 1878 – 22 October 1951). In 1932-1933 he pursued further studies in Munich. As a student in Munich, he personally witnessed the rants of Adolf Hitler.

Colledge was an excellent linguist with mastery of the French, German and Dutch languages. He was recruited by British Intelligence shortly after the outbreak of World War II, and spent the war working on military intelligence for Great Britain. Between 1945 and 1946, he served on the Allied Control Council's committee, which oversaw the restoration of German universities in Berlin. He returned to LU in 1946 as a full Lecturer, and was subsequently appointed Senior Lecturer (1952–1961) and Reader (1961–1963). He lectured on medieval literature and the history of the English language. Many of his students have gone on to chair English departments at universities in the United Kingdom and the United States. In addition to teaching, he also directed and acted in productions with the university's Dramatic Society. Through this interest, he became friends with the actress Patricia Routledge while she was a Liverpool student. She credits Colledge for persuading her to pursue a professional acting career.

In 1963, Colledge resigned from his post at LU in order to join the Order of Saint Augustine at Clare Priory in Suffolk. At this time he assumed the religious name of Brother Edmund. He pursued further religious studies in Rome, after which he was ordained a priest in 1967. In 1968, he became an assistant professor at the Pontifical Institute of Mediaeval Studies in Toronto, Ontario, Canada. He was soon after promoted to full Professor at that institution, remaining there through 1977. He then returned to England to join the teaching staff at Austin Friars St Monica's School in Carlisle. He lived his latter years in Kent and died in Deal in 1999 at the age of 89.
