= Walter Hilton =

English Augustinian mystic (1340/1345–1396)

- Born: 1340-1345; Lancashire
- Died: 24 March 1396
- Feast: 24 March (UK); 9 November (US)
- Major works: List of works

Walter Hilton, Can. Reg. (c. 1340/1345 – 24 March 1396) was an English Augustinian mystic, whose works gained influence in 15th-century England and Wales. He is commemorated by the Church of England and by the Episcopal Church in the United States.

== Life ==
Walter Hilton was born about 1340–1345. Writing centuries later, an early 16th-century Carthusian, James Grenehalgh of Lancashire, referred to Hilton as a mystic coming "from the same region".

There is presumptive evidence that Hilton attended the University of Cambridge, some time between about 1360 and 1382. Walter de Hilton, Bachelor of Civil Law, clerk of Lincoln Diocese, was granted the reservation of a canonry and prebend of Abergwili, Carmarthen, in January 1371. In January 1371 Hilton was a bachelor of law attached to the diocesan court of Ely. Some manuscripts describe Hilton as a commensor or inceptor decretorum, i.e. one who had completed the studies and examinations for a mastership of canon law, but had not undertaken the regency that would give him the title.

In the early 1380s, Hilton turned away from the world and became a solitary, as he tells in his earliest extant work, a Latin letter De Imagine Peccati (On the Image of Sin). Not long after (perhaps in 1384), Hilton states in a Latin epistle of spiritual counsel, De Utilitate et Prerogativis Religionis (On the Usefulness and Prerogatives of Religion, also known as Epistola aurea), addressed to his friend Adam Horsley, a former officer of the Exchequer, who was about to enter the Carthusian Order, that he is himself open to the idea of joining a religious community but still uncertain of his vocation. Since Horsley entered the Beauvale Charterhouse in 1386, it seems likely that Hilton also joined a community around that date: 1386 is often suggested as his date of entry into Thurgarton Priory, Nottinghamshire, as an Augustinian Canon Regular.

Between 1386 and 1390, Hilton was probably the author of Epistola de Leccione, Intencione, Oracione, Meditacione et Allis (Letter on Reading, Intention, Prayer and Meditation), of a brief treatise in English Of Angels' Song, which criticizes an aspect of Richard Rolle's spirituality, and of The Epistle on the Mixed Life, which instructs a devout layman about wealth and household responsibility, advising him not to give up his active life to become a contemplative, but to mix the two. Strong echoes between the Mixed Life and the first of the two books of Hilton's major work, The Scale of Perfection suggest they were probably written about the same time, in the late 1380s. Hilton may also have translated The Prickynge of Love (Stimulus Amoris), an expansion of a book originally by the 13th-century Franciscan James of Milan, which by then was passing under the name of Bonaventure), although this remains a matter of dispute.

Start of Hilton's translation of Lluis de Font's Eight Chapters on Perfection

In his final years from about 1390 to about 1396, Hilton probably wrote his Latin letter Epistola ad Quemdam Seculo Renunciare Volentem (To Someone Wanting to Renounce the World) and a brief piece on scruples entitled Firmissime crede. He also produced an English version of Eight Chapters on Perfection, which translates a now lost Latin work by the Franciscan Lluis de Font (or Luis de Fontibus), an Aragonese Franciscan who had a regency in theology at Cambridge in either 1391–1393 or 1393–1394. Also in that period, Hilton produced the second book of The Scale of Perfection. According to manuscript tradition, Hilton died on 24 March 1396 as an Augustinian Canon Regular at Thurgarton Priory. However, the manuscript concerned was written much later than the history it reports and contains several historical mistakes.

== Works ==
The first book of The Scale of Perfection (the title is editorial, appearing only on half the manuscripts of Book One) is addressed to a woman recently enclosed as an anchoress, offering her appropriate spiritual exercises. Most of its 93 chapters deal with extirpation of the "foul image of sin" in the soul – perversion of the image of the Trinity in the three spiritual powers of Mind, Reason and Will (reflecting the Father, Son and Holy Spirit, after a tradition drawn from St Augustine) – through a series of meditations on the seven deadly sins. The second book, which addresses itself to Hilton's former reader, who he says has further questions, seems from its style and content rather to address a larger, perhaps more sophisticated audience. Its main theme is reformation of the soul, in faith alone and in both faith and feeling. The latter is presented in an extended metaphor as a spiritual journey to Jerusalem, which is "contemplation in perfect love of God". The first book of the Scale was apparently written some time before the second and circulated separately.

The Mixed Life occasionally appears with the Scale in 15th-century manuscripts and was printed by De Worde in 1494 as a third book of the Scale, possibly at the desire of Lady Margaret Beaufort, Countess of Richmond and Derby, mother of King Henry VII. It occurs in only half the surviving copies of that printing, but all later printings of the Scale included it.

Hilton wrote three other Latin letters of spiritual guidance – the Epistola de Leccione, Intencione, Oracione, Meditacione et Allis, the Epistola ad Quemdam Seculo Renunciare Volentem and Firmissime crede – and a scholastic quodlibet defending images in churches, a practice criticised by Lollards. He also wrote commentaries on the Psalm texts Qui Habitat and Bonum Est (Psalms 90.1 and 91.2), and perhaps on the Canticle Benedictus (Luke 1.68).

== Later influence ==
Hilton's mystical system is, in the main, a simplification of that of Richard of Saint Victor. His spiritual writings were influential in 15th-century England. They were applied extensively shortly after his death in the Speculum spiritualium. The most famous was the Scale of Perfection, which survives in some 62 manuscripts, including 14 of a Latin translation (the Liber de nobilitate anime) made about 1400 by Hilton's contemporary at Cambridge and Ely, the Carmelite friar Thomas Fishlake (or Fyslake). This translation became the first work written originally in English to circulate on the European continent. The Scale and Mixed Life were printed by Wynkyn de Worde in Westminster in 1494 at the request of Lady Margaret, and five more times before the English Reformation of the 1530s.

With the revival of the Roman Catholic Church in England in the 19th century, a modernised version of a 1659 edition was issued by J. B. Dalgairns in 1870. Evelyn Underhill published an edition of the Scale in 1923.

== Veneration ==
While never canonized by the Catholic Church, Hilton was honoured with a commemoration in the Church of England on 24 March and in the American Episcopal Church on 9 November, along with Richard Rolle and Margery Kempe.

== Modern editions ==
- Walter Hilton: The Scale of Perfection, ed. Thomas H. Bestul, TEAMS Middle English Texts Series, (Kalamazoo, Michigan: Medieval Institute Publications, 2000). The only modern edition of the original Middle English text
- The Scale of Perfection, ed. Halcyon Backhouse, (London: Hodder and Stoughton, 1992). A translation based on Underhill's 1923 text
- Walter Hilton, The Scale of Perfection, translated by John P. H. Clark and Rosemary Dorward, (New York: Paulist Press, 1991). The most recent modern translation
- Walter Hilton's Latin Writings, ed. J. P. H. Clark and C. Taylor, (Salzburg: Institut für Anglistik und Amerikanistik, 1987)
- Walter Hilton's Mixed Life: edited from Lambeth Palace MS 472, ed. S. J. Ogilvie-Thomson, (Salzburg: Institut für Anglistik und Amerikanistik, 1986)
- The Prickynge of Love, ed. Harold Kane. 2 vols., (Salzburg: Institut für Anglistik und Amerikanistik, 1983). Middle English edition of The Goad of Love
- Two Minor Works of Walter Hilton, ed. Fumio Kuriyagawa and Toshiyuki Takamiya, (Tokyo: T. Takamiya, 1980). Editions of Of Angels' Song and Eight Chapters on Perfection
- The Scale of Perfection, abridged and presented by Illtyd Trethowan, (London: Geoffrey Chapman, 1975). A translation based on Underhill's 1923 text
- The Ladder of Perfection, translated and introduced by Leo Sherley-Price, (Penguin Classics, 1957). A translation based on Underhill's 1923 text
- An Exposition of "Qui habitat" and "Bonum est" in English, ed. Björn Wallner, (Lund: C. W. K. Gleerup, 1954)
- The Goad of Love: An Unpublished Translation [by] Walter Hilton, of the Stimulus Amoris formerly attributed to St. Bonaventura, edited and translated by Clare Kirchberger, (London: Faber and Faber, 1952). A work previously attributed to Hilton
- The Scale of Perfection, ed. Evelyn Underhill, (London: J. M. Watkins, 1923)
- C. Horstman, ed., Yorkshire Writers: Richard Rolle of Hampole, an English Father of the Church and His Followers, 2 vols, (London: S. Sonnenschein & Co.), 1895–1896. Includes editions of Hilton's Of Angels' Song (1:175–82) and On the Mixed Life (1:264–92)
