= St. Catherine of Siena's Church =

St. Catherine of Siena's Church or St. Catherine of Siena Church may refer to:

== Philippines ==
- Santa Catalina de Siena Church (Bambang), Nueva Vizcaya
- Saint Catherine of Siena Parish Church, Samal, Bataan

== United Kingdom ==
- St Catherine of Siena Church, Birmingham
- St Catherine of Siena Church, Cocking, West Sussex
- St Catherine of Siena, Richmond, Sheffield
- Church of Our Lady and St Catherine of Siena, Bow, London

== United States ==
- St. Catherine of Siena Church and School, Reseda, California
- St. Catherine of Siena Church (Riverside, Connecticut)
- St. Catherine of Siena Church (Trumbull, Connecticut)
- Chapel on the Rock (Saint Catherine of Siena Chapel), Allenspark, Colorado
- St. Mary – St. Catherine of Siena Parish, Charlestown, Massachusetts
- St. Catherine of Siena Roman Catholic Church, Detroit, Michigan
- St. Catherine of Siena Church (New York City)
- St. Catherine of Siena Catholic Church (Wake Forest, North Carolina)
- St. Catherine of Siena (Moscow, Pennsylvania)

== See also ==
- Saint Catherine of Siena Parish School (disambiguation)
- Catherine of Siena
