= Saint Catherine of Siena Parish School =

St. Catherine of Siena Parish School may refer to a number of Catholic schools:

- Saint Catherine of Siena Parish School, Laguna Beach, California, part of the Roman Catholic Diocese of Orange
- Saint Catherine of Siena Parish School, Reseda, California, part of the Roman Catholic Archdiocese of Los Angeles
- Saint Catherine of Siena Parish School, Wake Forest, North Carolina, part of the Roman Catholic Diocese of Raleigh
- Saint Catherine of Siena Parish School, Cedar Grove, New Jersey, part of the Roman Catholic Archdiocese of Newark

== See also ==
- Catherine of Siena
- St Catherine's School (disambiguation)
- St. Catherine of Siena Church and School
