= The Dialogue of Saint Catherine of Siena =

14th century Christian mysticism work

The Dialogue of Saint Catherine of Siena, or The Dialogue of Divine Providence, or The Book of Divine Teaching is a 14th century work by Catherine of Siena, a saint, mystic, and a Doctor of the Church.

The Dialogue is one of the chief classic of Christian mysticism. In Catherine's spirituality, special experiences and personal crises are not central, but the light of the Gospel seen through the eyes of faith, and the renewal of the Church and the world in this light. Traditionally, the work is divided into four parts, the themes of which are God's providence, discretion, prayer, and obedience. Since then, scholars have considered that this division obscures the true structure of the work. The longest section of the work presents Christ as a bridge between people and God. Its theme is that the salvation of the world can only happen through Christ, his blood and sacrificial love. The contemplation of the heart of Christ is one of the central themes of Catherine. The work ends with a hymn of praise.

English translations of The Dialogue include:

- The Dialogue, trans. Suzanne Noffke, OP Paulist Press (Classics of Western Spirituality), 1980.
- The Dialogue of St. Catherine of Siena, TAN Books, 2009. ISBN 978-0-89555-149-8
- Phyllis Hodgson and Gabriel M. Liegey, eds., The Orcherd of Syon, (London; New York: Oxford University Press, 1966) [A Middle English translation of the Dialogo from the early fifteenth century, first printed in 1519].
