= Catherine of Siena =

Italian Dominican philosopher and saint (1347–1380)

Saint Catherine of Siena TOSD
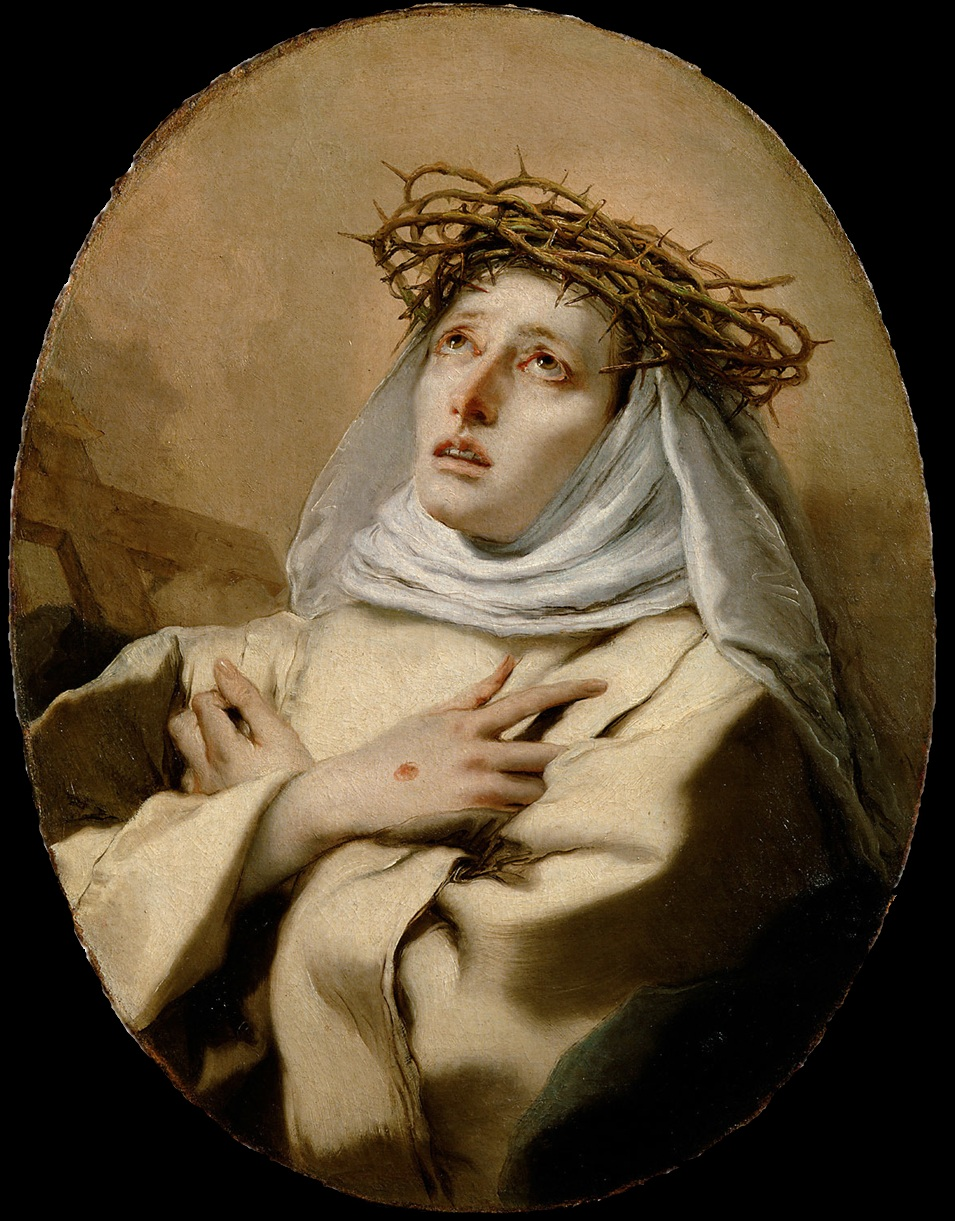
- St. Catherine of Siena by Giovanni Battista Tiepolo

Virgin, Doctor of the Church
- Born: Caterina di Jacopo di Benincasa; 25 March 1347; Siena, Republic of Siena
- Died: 29 April 1380 (aged 33); Rome, Papal States
- Venerated in: Catholic Church; Anglican Communion; Lutheranism
- Beatified: 29 December 1460
- Canonized: 29 June 1461 by Pope Pius II
- Major shrine: Santa Maria sopra Minerva, Rome and the Sanctuary of Saint Catherine, Siena
- Feast: 29 April; 30 April (Roman Calendar, 1628–1969); 4 October (Italian civil calendar with Saint Francis)
- Attributes: habit of a Dominican tertiary, ring, lily, cherubim, crown of thorns, stigmata, crucifix, book, heart, skull, dove, rose, miniature church, miniature ship bearing papal coat of arms
- Patronage: against fire; bodily ills; people ridiculed for their piety; nurses; sick people; miscarriages; Europe; Italy; Diocese of Allentown, Pennsylvania, US; Bambang, Nueva Vizcaya, Philippines; Samal, Bataan, Philippines

Caterina di Jacopo di Benincasa, TOSD (25 March 1347 – 29 April 1380), known as Catherine of Siena, was an Italian Catholic mystic and diplomat who engaged in papal and Italian politics through extensive letter-writing and advocacy. Canonised in 1461, she is revered as a saint and as a Doctor of the Church due to her extensive theological authorship. She is also considered to have influenced Italian literature.

Born and raised in Siena, Catherine wanted from an early age to devote herself to God, against the will of her parents. She joined the mantellates, a group of pious women, primarily widows, informally devoted to Dominican spirituality; later these types of urban pious groups would be formalised as the Third Order Dominicans, but not until after Catherine's death. Her influence with Pope Gregory XI played a role in his 1376 decision to leave Avignon for Rome. The Pope then sent Catherine to negotiate peace with the Florentine Republic. After Gregory XI's death (March 1378) and the conclusion of peace (July 1378), she returned to Siena.

Catherine dictated to secretaries her set of spiritual treatises, The Dialogue of Divine Providence, between 1377 and 1378. Thereafter, the Great Schism of the West led Catherine of Siena to go to Rome with the pope. She sent numerous letters to princes and cardinals to promote obedience to Pope Urban VI and to defend what she calls the "vessel of the Church". She died on 29 April 1380, exhausted by her rigorous fasting. Her funeral and burial took place in the Basilica of Santa Maria sopra Minerva in Rome.

Devotion to Catherine developed rapidly after her death. Pope Pius II canonised her in 1461; she was declared a patron saint of Rome in 1866 by Pope Pius IX, and of Italy (together with Francis of Assisi) in 1939 by Pope Pius XII. She was the second woman to be declared a Doctor of the Church, on 4 October 1970 by Pope Paul VI – only days after Teresa of Ávila. In 1999 Pope John Paul II proclaimed her a patron saint of Europe.

Catherine is one of the outstanding figures of medieval Catholicism due to the strong influence she had in the history of the papacy and her extensive authorship. Her many missions entrusted to her by the pope were rare for a woman of her time. Her Dialogue, hundreds of letters, and dozens of prayers also give her a prominent place in the history of Italian literature.

== Early life ==
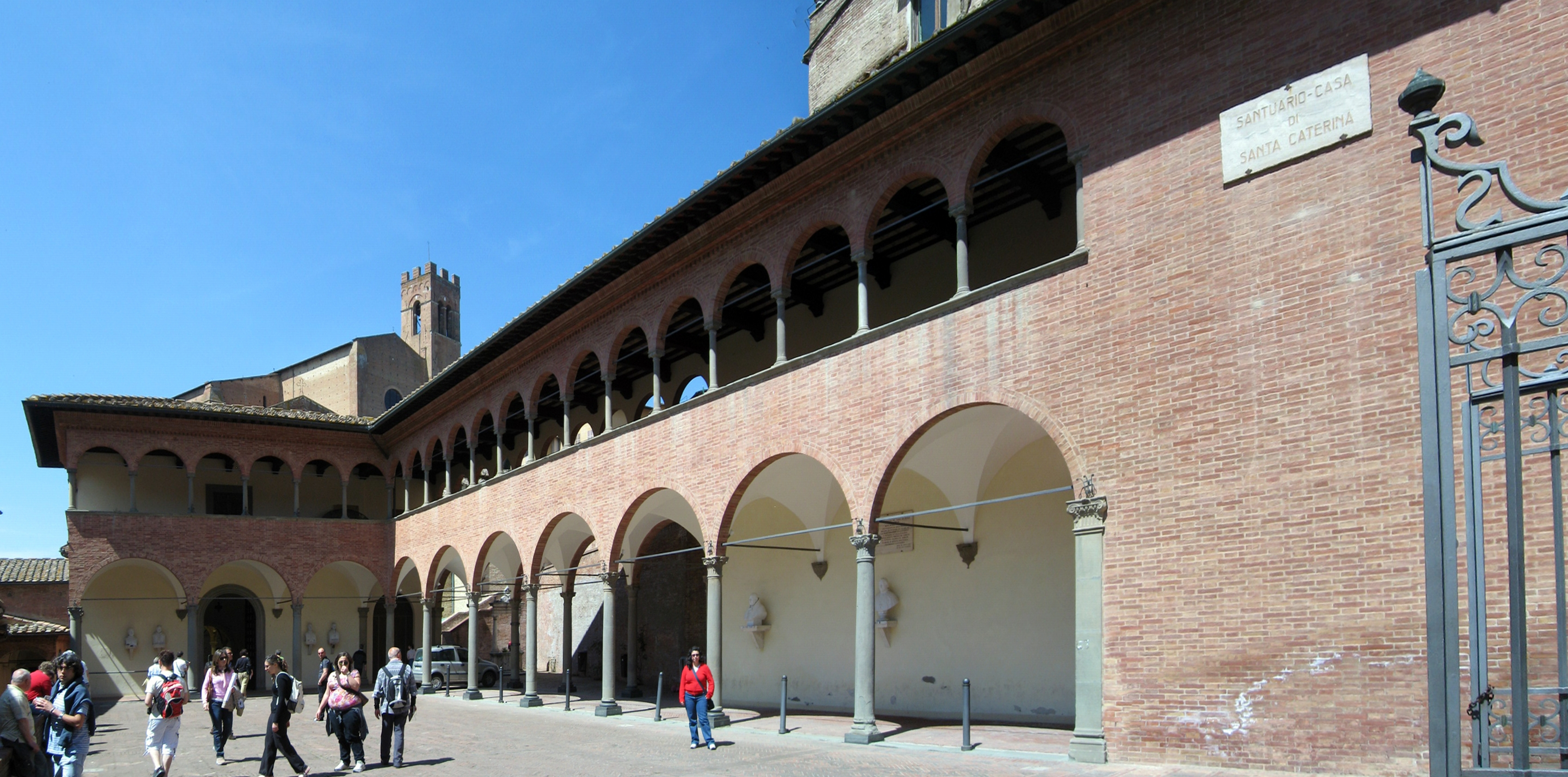
The house of Saint Catherine in Siena

Caterina di Jacopo di Benincasa was born on 25 March 1347 (shortly before the Black Death ravaged Europe) in Siena, Republic of Siena (today Italy), to Lapa Piagenti, the daughter of a local poet, and Jacopo di Benincasa, a cloth dyer who ran his enterprise with the help of his sons. The house where Catherine grew up still exists.

Lapa was about forty years old when she gave birth prematurely to her 23rd and 24th children, twin daughters, named Catherine and Giovanna. After birth, Giovanna was handed over to a wet nurse and died soon after. Catherine was nursed by her mother and developed into a healthy child. She was two years old when Lapa had her 25th child, another daughter named Giovanna. As a child, Catherine was so merry that the family gave her the pet name of "Euphrosyne", which is Greek for "joy", and the name of Euphrosyne of Alexandria.

Catherine is said by her confessor and biographer Raymond of Capua's Life to have had her first vision of Christ when she was five or six years old: she and a brother were on the way home from visiting a married sister when she is said to have experienced a vision of Christ seated in glory with the Apostles Peter, Paul, and John. Raymond continues that at age seven, Catherine vowed to give her whole life to God.

When Catherine was 16, her older sister Bonaventura died in childbirth; already anguished by this, Catherine soon learned that her parents wanted her to marry Bonaventura's widower. She was absolutely opposed and started a strict fast to protest the wedding. She had learned this from Bonaventura, whose husband had been far from considerate but had changed his attitude after his wife refused to eat until he showed better manners. Besides fasting, Catherine further disappointed her mother by cutting off her long hair in protest of being encouraged to improve her appearance to attract a husband.

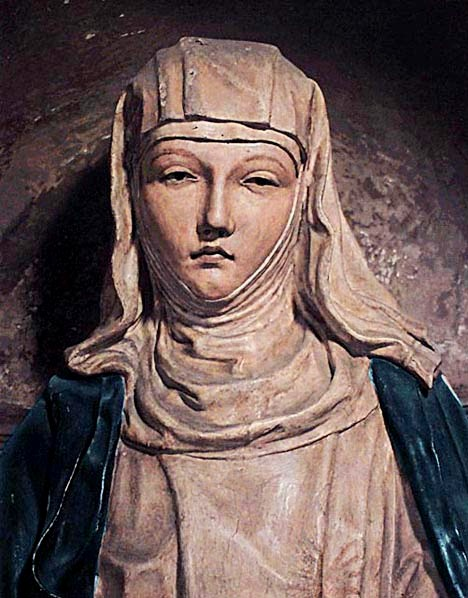
Statuette by Neroccio di Bartolomeo de' Landi (1475)

Catherine would later advise Raymond of Capua to do during times of trouble what she did now as a teenager: "Build a cell inside your mind, from which you can never flee." Although her family often interrupted her external solitude, she cultivated an interior life of recollection and prayer that she believed no external circumstance could take away.

She also imagined her father as representing Christ, her mother the Blessed Virgin Mary, and her brothers the Apostles. Serving them humbly became an opportunity for spiritual growth. Catherine resisted the accepted course of marriage and motherhood on the one hand, or a nun's veil on the other. She chose to live an active and prayerful life outside a convent's walls, following the model of the Dominicans. Eventually, her parents gave up and permitted her to live as she pleased and stay unmarried.

A vision of Dominic de Guzmán gave strength to Catherine, but her wish to join his order was no comfort to Lapa, who took her daughter with her to the baths in Bagno Vignoni to improve her health. Catherine fell seriously ill with a violent rash, fever and pain, which conveniently made her mother accept her wish to join the "Mantellate", the local association of devout women. The Mantellate taught Catherine how to read, and she lived in almost total silence and solitude in the family home.

It was customary for Catherine to give away clothing and food without asking anyone's permission, which cost her family significantly. However, she requested nothing for herself and by staying in their midst, she could live out her rejection of them more strongly. She did not want their food, referring to the table laid for her in Heaven with her real family. Shortly after joining the Mantellate, Catherine started to fast for longer but found it challenging. While tending to a woman with cancerous breast sores, she was disgusted. Intending to overcome that disgust, she gathered the sore pus into a ladle and drank it all. That night, she was visited by Jesus who invited her to drink the blood gushing out of his pierced side. It was with this visitation that her stomach "no longer had need of food and no longer could digest."

== Later life ==
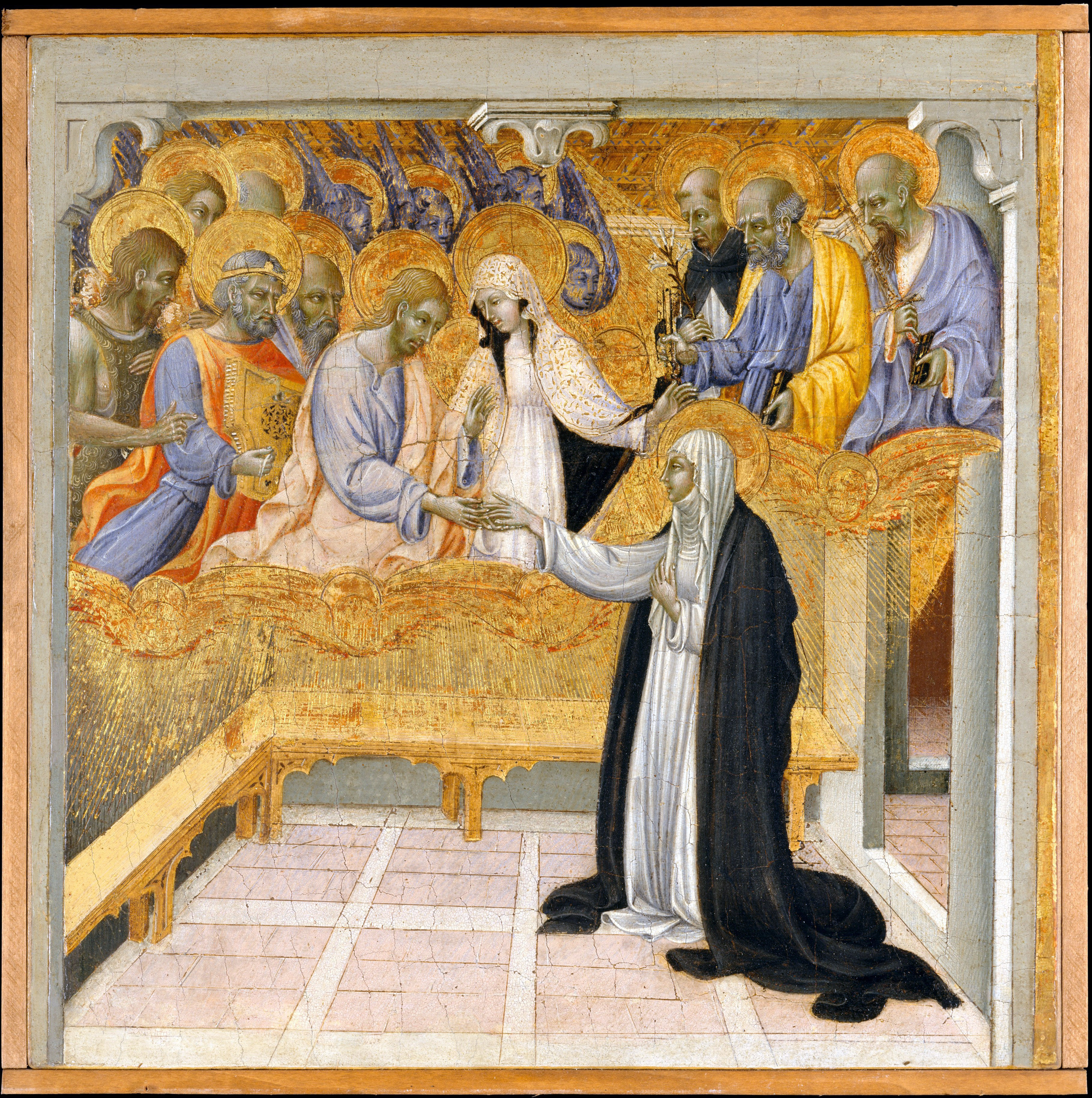
Giovanni di Paolo, The Mystic Marriage of Saint Catherine of Siena

According to Raymond of Capua, at the age of twenty-one (c. 1368), Catherine experienced what she described in her letters as a Mystical Marriage with Jesus, later a popular subject in art as the Mystic marriage of Saint Catherine. She wrote in a letter (to encourage a nun who seems to have been undergoing a prolonged period of spiritual trial and torment: "Bathe in the blood of Christ crucified. See that you don't look for or want anything but the crucified, as a true bride ransomed by the blood of Christ crucified – for that is my wish. You see very well that you are a bride and that he has espoused you – you and everyone else – and not with a ring of silver but with a ring of his own flesh." Raymond of Capua also records that she was told by Christ to leave her withdrawn life and enter the public life of the world. Catherine rejoined her family and began helping the ill and the poor, where she took care of them in hospitals or homes. Her early pious activities in Siena attracted a group of followers, women and men, who gathered around her.

The Medieval scholar Caroline Walker Bynum with regards to Catherine's mystic marriage, imagines: "Underlining the extent to which the marriage was a fusion with Christ's physicality [...] Catherine received, not the ring of gold and jewels that her biographer reports in his bowdlerized version, but the ring of Christ's foreskin." Catherine herself mentions the ring ‘of flesh’ motif in one of her letters (#221), equating the wedding ring of a virgin with the flesh of Jesus; she typically claimed that her own wedding ring to Christ was simply invisible.

Between the years 1367 and 1374, Catherine devoted herself to helping the sick and incarcerated of Siena. With her help in the Hospital of Santa Maria della Scala and within the neighbourhood that she was living, Catherine's acts of charity became well-known. This led to her being known as santa donna, or a holy woman. This reputation of holiness eventually led to her involvement in politics and a hearing with the pope.

As social and political tensions mounted in Siena, Catherine found herself drawn to intervene in wider politics. She made her first journey to Florence in 1374, probably to be interviewed by the Dominican authorities at the General Chapter held in Florence in May 1374, though this is disputed (if she was interviewed, then the absence of later evidence suggests she was deemed sufficiently orthodox). It seems that at this time she acquired Raymond of Capua as her confessor and spiritual director.

After this visit, she began travelling with her followers throughout northern and central Italy advocating reform of the clergy and advising people that repentance and renewal could be done through "the total love for God". In Pisa, in 1375, she used what influence she had to sway that city and Lucca away from alliance with the anti-papal league whose force was gaining momentum and strength. She also lent her enthusiasm toward promoting the launch of a new crusade. It was during this time in Pisa, according to Raymond of Capua's biography, that she received the stigmata (visible, at Catherine's request, only to herself).

Her physical travels were not the only way in which Catherine made her views known. From 1375 onward, she began dictating letters to scribes. These letters were intended to reach men and women of her circle, increasingly widening her audience to include figures in authority as she begged for peace between the republics and principalities of Italy and for the return of the Papacy from Avignon to Rome. She carried on a long correspondence with Pope Gregory XI, asking him to reform the clergy and the administration of the Papal States.

In June 1376, Catherine went to Avignon as ambassador of the Republic of Florence to make peace with the Papal States (on 31 March 1376 Gregory XI had placed Florence under interdict). She was unsuccessful and was disowned by the Florentine leaders, who sent ambassadors to negotiate on their own terms as soon as Catherine's work had paved the way for them. Catherine sent an appropriately scorching letter back to Florence in response. Her criticism of clerical corruption did not lessen her strong view of obedience to the papal office. Johannes Jørgensen summarised Catherine's position as teaching that even if the pope were "Satan incarnate", Christians should not rebel against him, because dishonor shown to the pope, as "Christ on earth", was dishonor shown to Christ. Catherine made the same point directly in Letter 68, addressed to the leaders of Florence, where she argued that even if "the priests, the pastors, and Christ-on-earth were incarnate devils", Christians should remain "obedient and subject to them", not for their personal virtue, but "for the sake of God, and out of obedience to Him." While in Avignon, Catherine also tried to convince Pope Gregory XI, the last Avignon Pope, to return to Rome. Gregory returned his administration to Rome in January 1377; to what extent this was due to Catherine's influence is a topic of modern debate.

Catherine returned to Siena and spent the early months of 1377 founding a women's monastery of strict observance outside the city in the old fortress of Belcaro. She spent the rest of 1377 at Rocca d'Orcia, about 20 miles (32 km) from Siena, on a local mission of peace-making and preaching. During this period, in autumn 1377, she had the experience which led to the writing of her Dialogue and learned to write, although she still seems to have chiefly relied upon her secretaries for her correspondence.

Late in 1377 or early in 1378, Catherine again travelled to Florence, at the order of Gregory XI, to seek peace between Florence and Rome. Following Gregory's death in March 1378 riots, the revolts of the Ciompi broke out in Florence on 18 June in the ensuing violence Catherine was nearly assassinated. Eventually, in July 1378, peace was agreed between Florence and Rome and Catherine returned quietly to Florence.

In late November 1378, with the outbreak of the Western Schism, the new Pope, Urban VI, summoned her to Rome. She stayed at Pope Urban VI's court and tried to convince nobles and cardinals of his legitimacy, both meeting with individuals at court and writing letters to persuade others.

For many years she had accustomed herself to a rigorous abstinence. She received the Holy Eucharist almost daily. This extreme fasting appeared unhealthy in the eyes of the clergy and her own sisterhood. Her confessor, Raymond, ordered her to eat properly. However, Catherine replied that she was unable to, describing her inability to eat as an infermità (illness). From the beginning of 1380, Catherine could neither eat nor swallow water. On 26 February she lost the use of her legs.

Catherine died in Rome on 29 April 1380, at the age of thirty-three, having suffered a massive stroke eight days earlier, which paralysed her from the waist down. Her last words were, "Father, into Your Hands I commend my soul and my spirit".

== Works ==
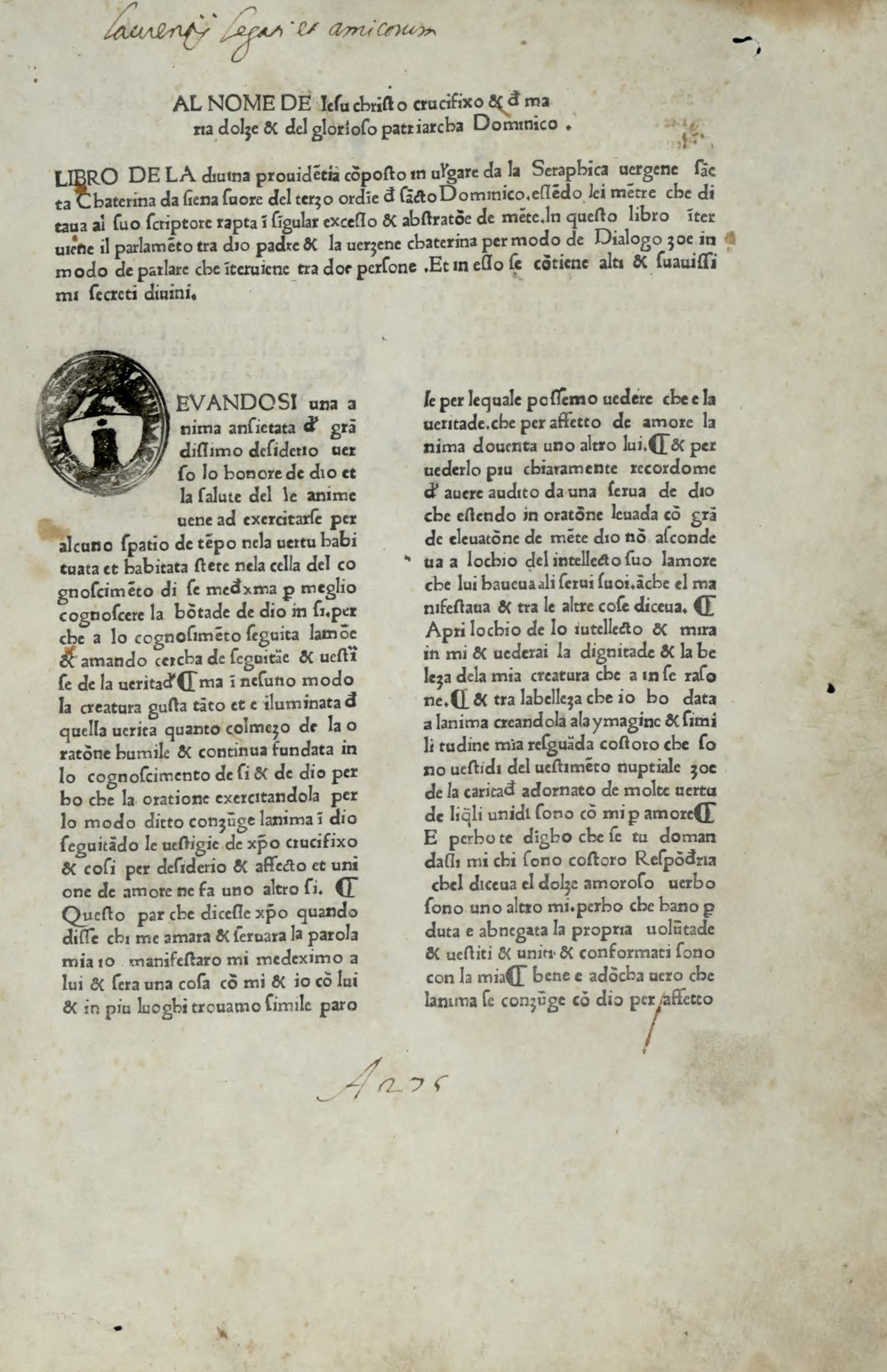
Libro della divina dottrina (commonly known as The Dialogue of Divine Providence), c. 1475

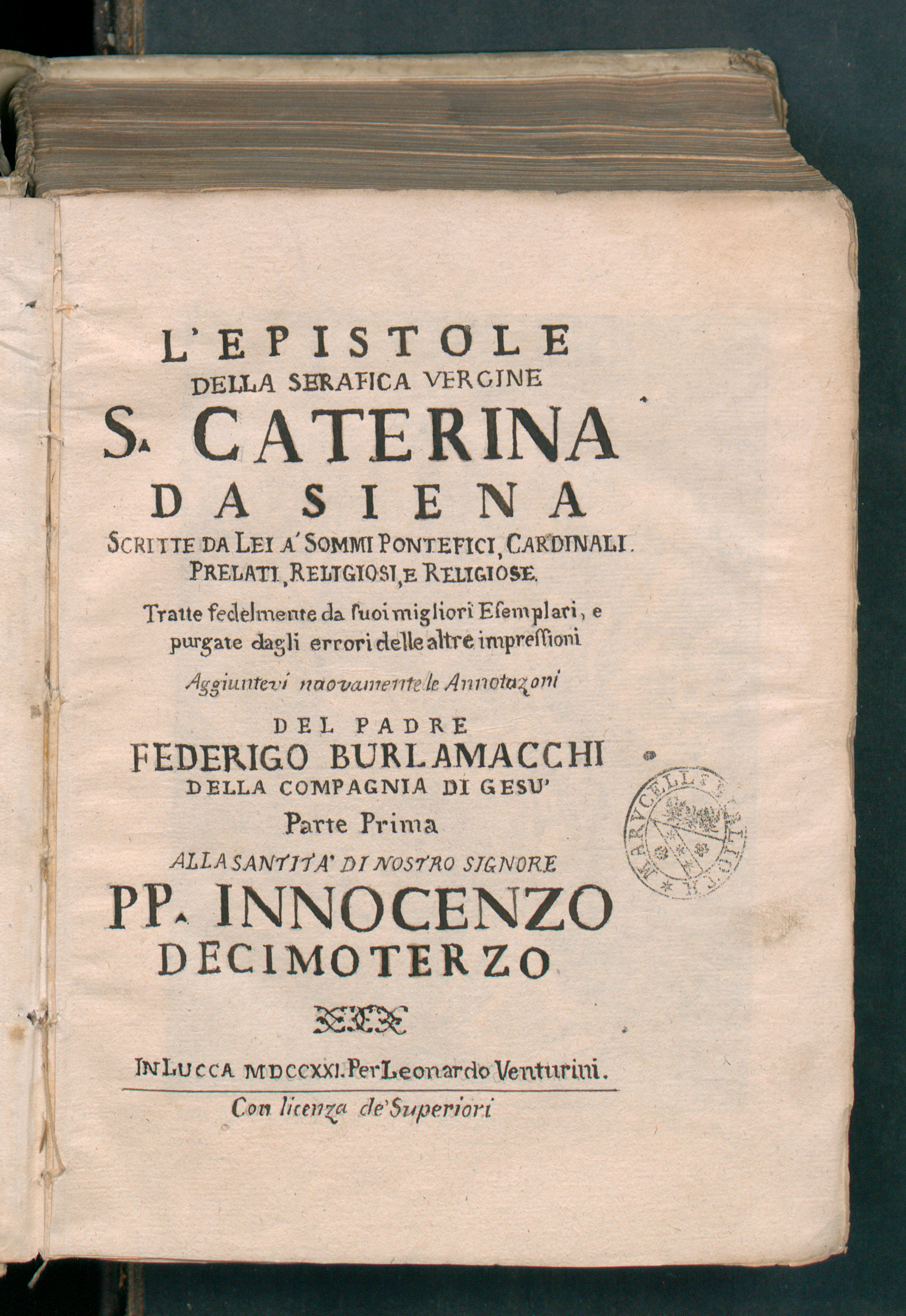
L'epistole della serafica vergine s. Caterina da Siena (1721)

Three genres of work by Catherine survive:

- Her major treatise is The Dialogue of Divine Providence, which is thought to have been begun in October 1377 and finished by November 1378. Contemporaries of Catherine are united in asserting that much of the book was dictated while Catherine was in ecstasy, though it also seems possible that Catherine herself may then have re-edited many passages in the book. This text is described as a dialogue between God and a soul.
- Catherine's letters are considered one of the great works of early Tuscan literature. Many of these were dictated, although she herself learned to write in 1377; 382 have survived. In her letters to the Pope, she often addressed him affectionately simply as Babbo ('Dearest Daddy'), instead of the formal form of address "Your Holiness". Other correspondents include her various confessors, among them Raymond of Capua, the kings of France and Hungary, the infamous mercenary John Hawkwood, the Queen of Naples, members of the Visconti family of Milan, and numerous religious figures.
- 26 prayers of Catherine of Siena also survive, mostly composed in the last 18 months of her life.

== Theology ==
Catherine's theology can be described as mystical, and was employed toward practical ends for her own spiritual life or those of others. She used the language of medieval scholastic philosophy to elaborate her experiential mysticism. Interested mainly with achieving an incorporeal union with God, Catherine practised extreme fasting and asceticism, eventually to the extent of living solely on the Eucharist every day. For Catherine, this practice was the means to fully realise her love of Christ in her mystical experience, with a large proportion of her ecstatic visions relating to the consumption or rejection of food during her life. She viewed Christ as a "bridge" between the soul and God and transmitted that idea, along with her other teachings, in her book The Dialogue. The Dialogue is highly systematic and explanatory in its presentation of her mystical ideas; however, these ideas themselves are not so much based on reason or logic as they are based in her ecstatic mystical experience. Her work was widely read across Europe, and survives in a Middle English translation called The Orchard of Syon.

In one of her letters she sent to her confessor, Raymond of Capua, she recorded this revelation from her conversation with Christ, in which he said: "Do you know what you are to Me, and what I am to you, my daughter? I am He who is, you are she who is not". This mystical concept of God as the wellspring of being is seen in the works and ideas of Aquinas and can be seen as a simplistic rendering of apotheosis and a more rudimentary form of the doctrine of divine simplicity. She describes God in her work, The Dialogue (which she referred to simply as "her book"), as a "sea, in which we are the fish", the point being that the relationship between God and man should not be seen as man contending against the Divine and vice versa, but as God being the endless being that supports all things.

According to the writings attributed to Catherine, in 1377 she had a vision in which the Virgin Mary confirmed to her a thesis supported by the Dominican Order, to which Catherine belonged: the Virgin said that she had been conceived with the original sin. The Virgin thus contradicted the future dogma of the Immaculate Conception. Cardinal Lambertini (later Pope Benedict XIV) in his treatise De servorum Dei beatificatione et de beatorum canonizatione, 1734–1738, cites theologians who believed that Catherine's directors or editors had falsified her words; he also cites Father Lancicius, who believed that Catherine had made a mistake as a result of preconceived ideas.

== Rhetorical influence ==
Catherine is considered the first woman writer in the Italian literary tradition.

Catherine demonstrated sophisticated and powerful rhetorical style, both as an orator and in her written work, particularly her correspondence. Her epistolary abilities were nurtured during the Middle Ages, a time when letter writing provided a platform for women to engage in communication. According to James A. Herrick, a scholar of rhetoric, women's engagement in letter writing faced fewer obstacles than literature or homiletics, a medium which provided a gateway for Catherine's rhetorical development. Letter writing relied on the use of the vernacular rather than classical languages used by nobility and the clergy. Because men of the late Medieval period were embroiled in wars during this violent time, women were more involved in household business and also had more time to develop literary skills than their male contemporaries. Dictamen manuals, written by men, provided strict guidelines on the proper form for writing letters at this time, with style and conventions that Catherine learned to master.

=== Catherine's epistolary rhetoric ===
Most of Catherine of Siena's letters were written between 1374 and 1380, the year she died. She wrote to many different kinds of people, including mercenaries, queens, popes, housewives, priests, nuns, prostitutes and prisoners. She adjusted her rhetoric to fit each individual to whom she wrote, employing strategies that would both appeal and even surprise her audience. Her letters demonstrate her intelligence, wit, creativity and confidence that she is speaking with authority from God.

Catherine, who was well-versed in Medieval letter-writing conventions, employed traditional forms of dictamen while breaking with these traditions to engage her correspondent. When writing to Pope Gregory XI, a bold critique uncharacteristic of the times would be followed by medieval convention of a humble apology.

In 1717, Girolamo Gigli created the dictionary, Vocabolario Cateriniano, translated "Catrininian Vocabulary", which catalogued hundreds of words from Catherine's written work and also contains essays about her extensive vocabulary and her contributions to the Italian language.

== Veneration ==
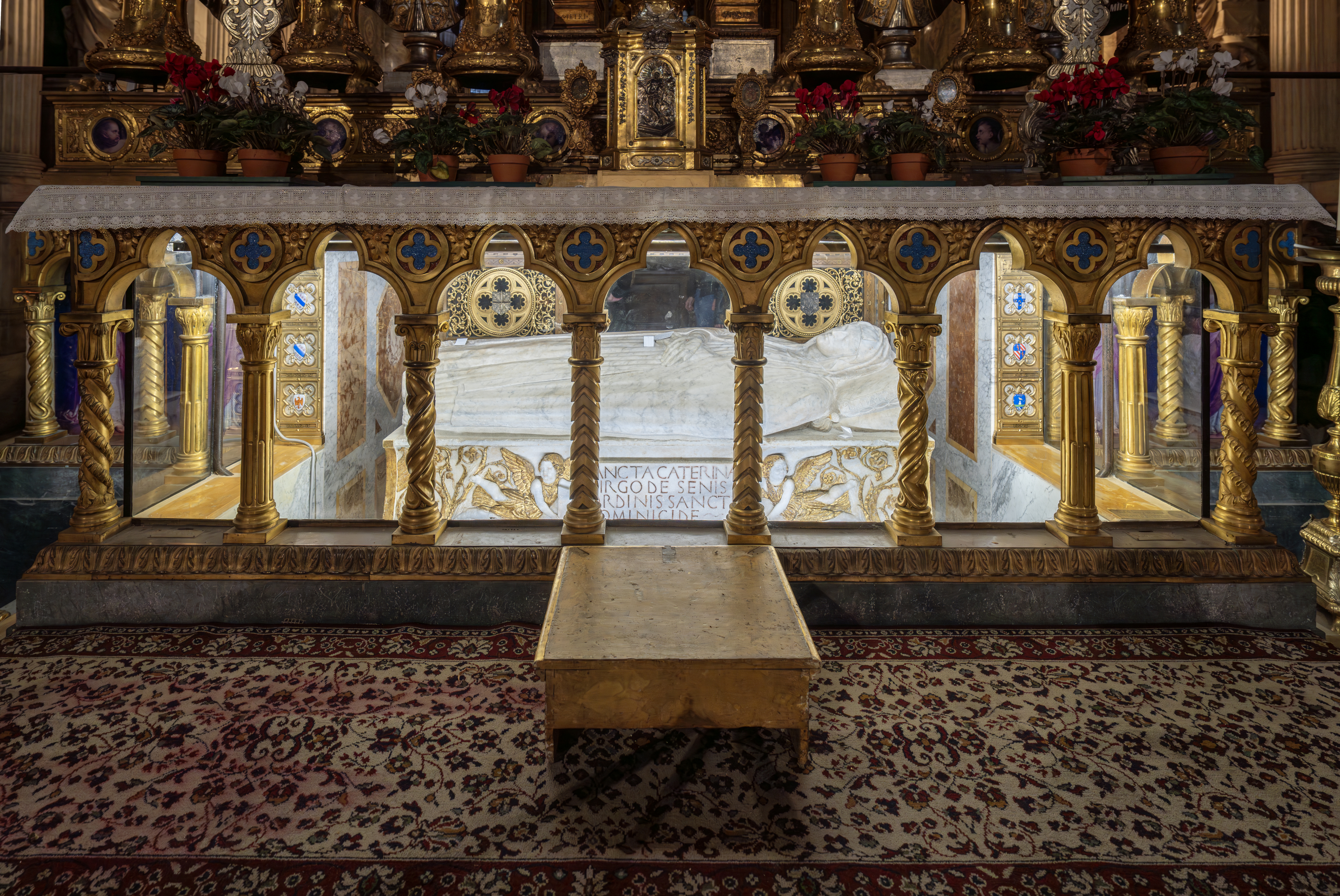
Reliquary of Saint Catherine beneath the High Altar of Santa Maria sopra Minerva, Rome

Catherine was initially buried in the (Roman) cemetery of Santa Maria sopra Minerva which lies near the Pantheon. After miracles were reported to take place at her grave, Raymond moved her inside Santa Maria sopra Minerva, where her body lies to this day.

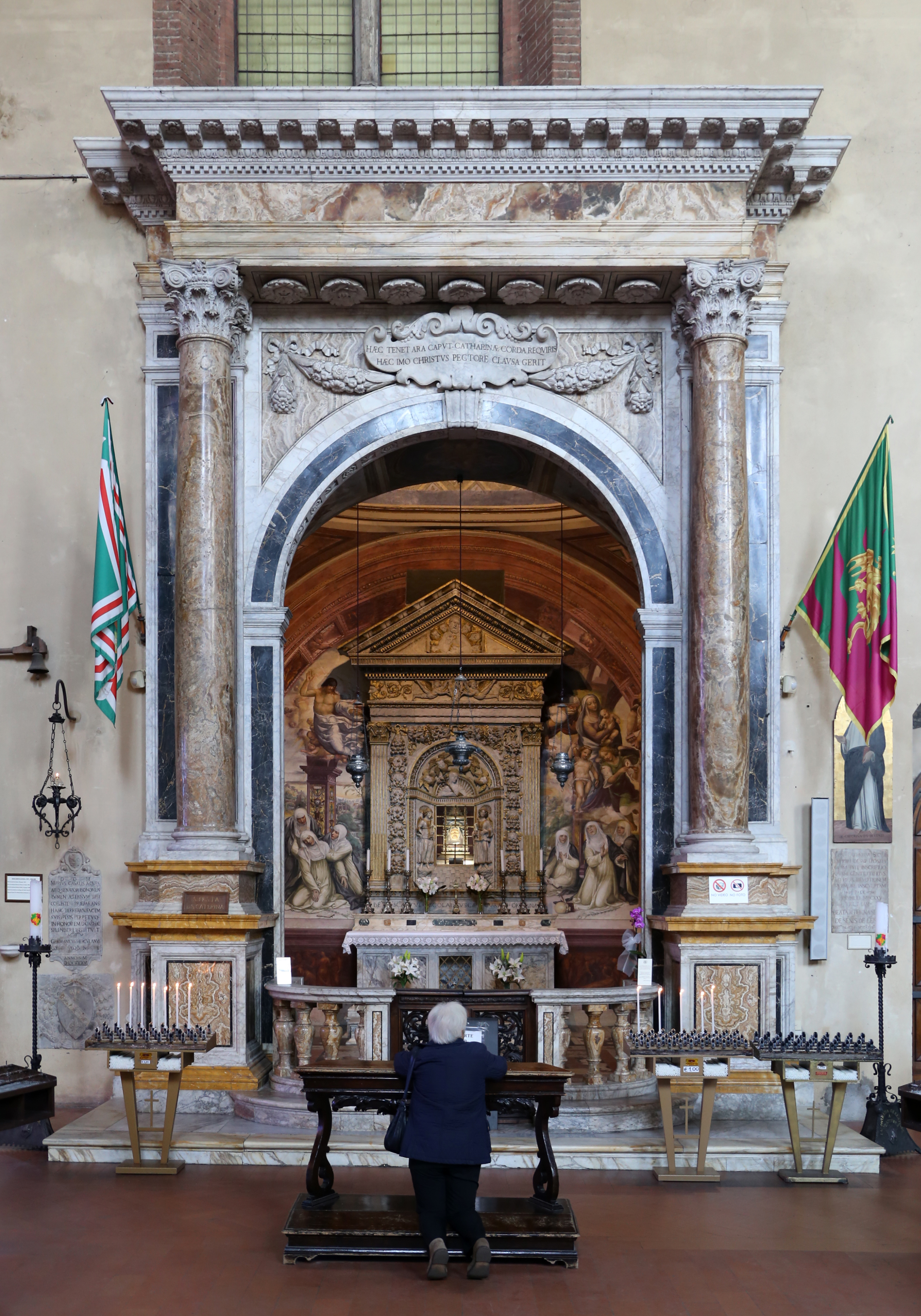
The Chapel of Saint Catherine, Basilica of San Domenico in Siena

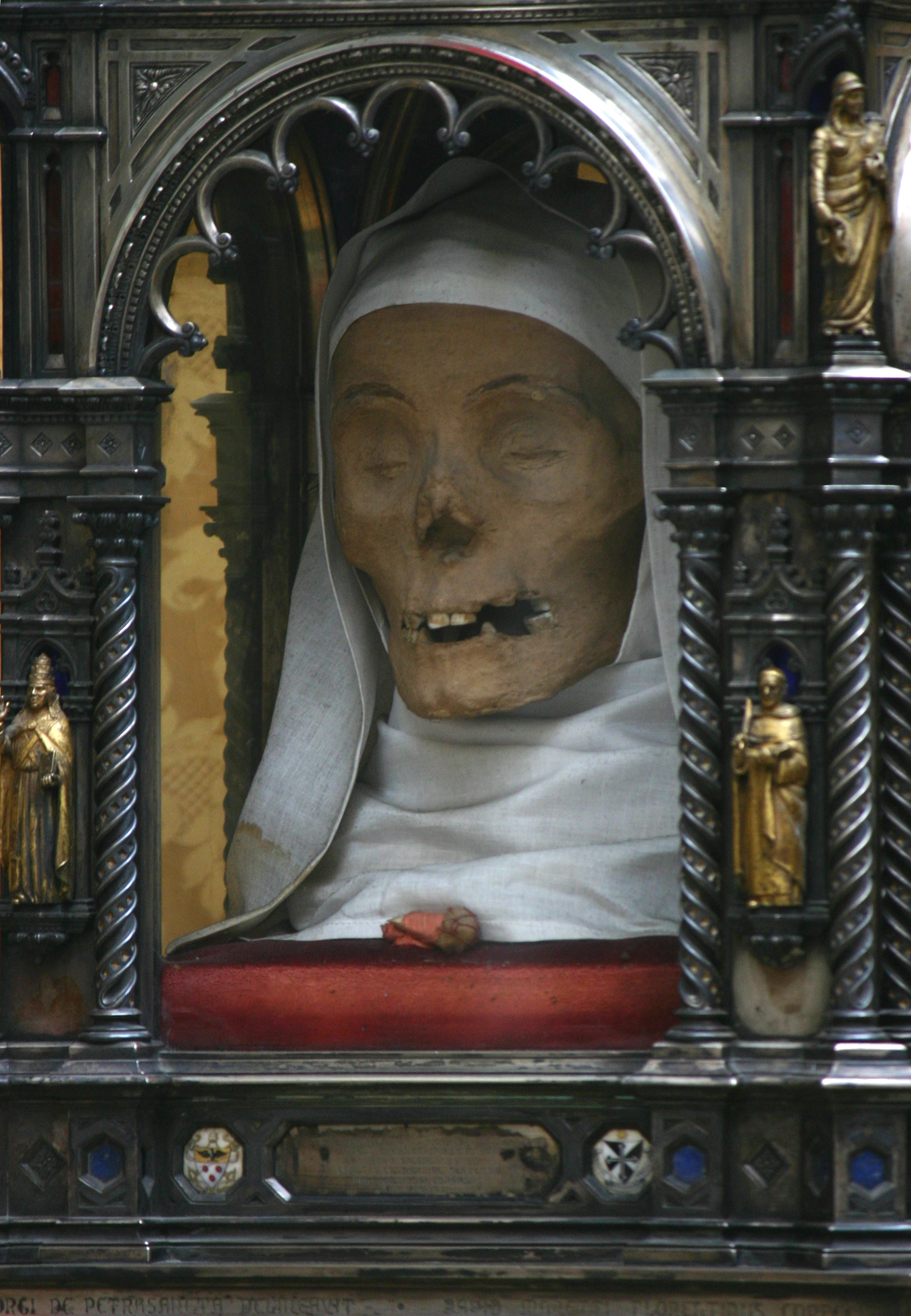
The relic of Catherine's skull, exposed in the Basilica of San Domenico, Siena

Her head, however, was parted from her body and inserted in a gilt bust of bronze. This bust was later taken to Siena, and carried through that city in a procession to the Dominican church. Behind the bust walked Lapa, Catherine's mother, who lived until she was 89 years old. By then she had seen the end of the wealth and the happiness of her family, and followed most of her children and several of her grandchildren to the grave. She helped Raymond of Capua write his biography of her daughter, and said, "I think God has laid my soul athwart in my body, so that it can't get out." The incorrupt head and thumb were entombed in the Basilica of San Domenico at Siena, where they remain.

Pope Pius II himself canonized Catherine on 29 June 1461.

On 4 October 1970, Pope Paul VI named Catherine a Doctor of the Church; this title was almost simultaneously given to Teresa of Ávila (27 September 1970), making them the first women to receive this honour.

However, Catherine's feast day was not initially included in the General Roman Calendar. When it was added in 1597, it was put on the day of her death, 29 April; however, because this conflicted with the feast of Saint Peter of Verona, which also fell on 29 April, Catherine's feast day was moved in 1628 to the new date of 30 April. In the 1969 revision of the calendar, it was decided to leave the celebration of the feast of St Peter of Verona to local calendars, because he was not as well known worldwide, and Catherine's feast was restored to 29 April.

Catherine is remembered in the Church of England and in the Episcopal Church on 29 April. The Evangelical Lutheran Church in America (ELCA) also commemorates Catherine of Siena on 29 April.

=== Patronage ===
In his decree of 13 April 1866, Pope Pius IX declared Catherine of Siena to be a co-patron of Rome. On 18 June 1939 Pope Pius XII named her a joint patron saint of Italy along with Francis of Assisi.

On 1 October 1999, Pope John Paul II made her one of Europe's patron saints, along with Teresa Benedicta of the Cross and Bridget of Sweden. She is also the patron of the historically Catholic American woman's fraternity, Theta Phi Alpha.

=== Severed head ===
The people of Siena wished to have Catherine's body. A story is told of a miracle whereby they were partially successful: knowing that they could not smuggle her whole body out of Rome, they decided to take only her head which they placed in a bag. Reportedly, when stopped by the Roman guards, they prayed to Catherine to help them, confident that she would rather have her body (or at least part thereof) in Siena. When they opened the bag to show the guards, it appeared no longer to hold her head but to be full of rose petals.

== Biographical sources ==
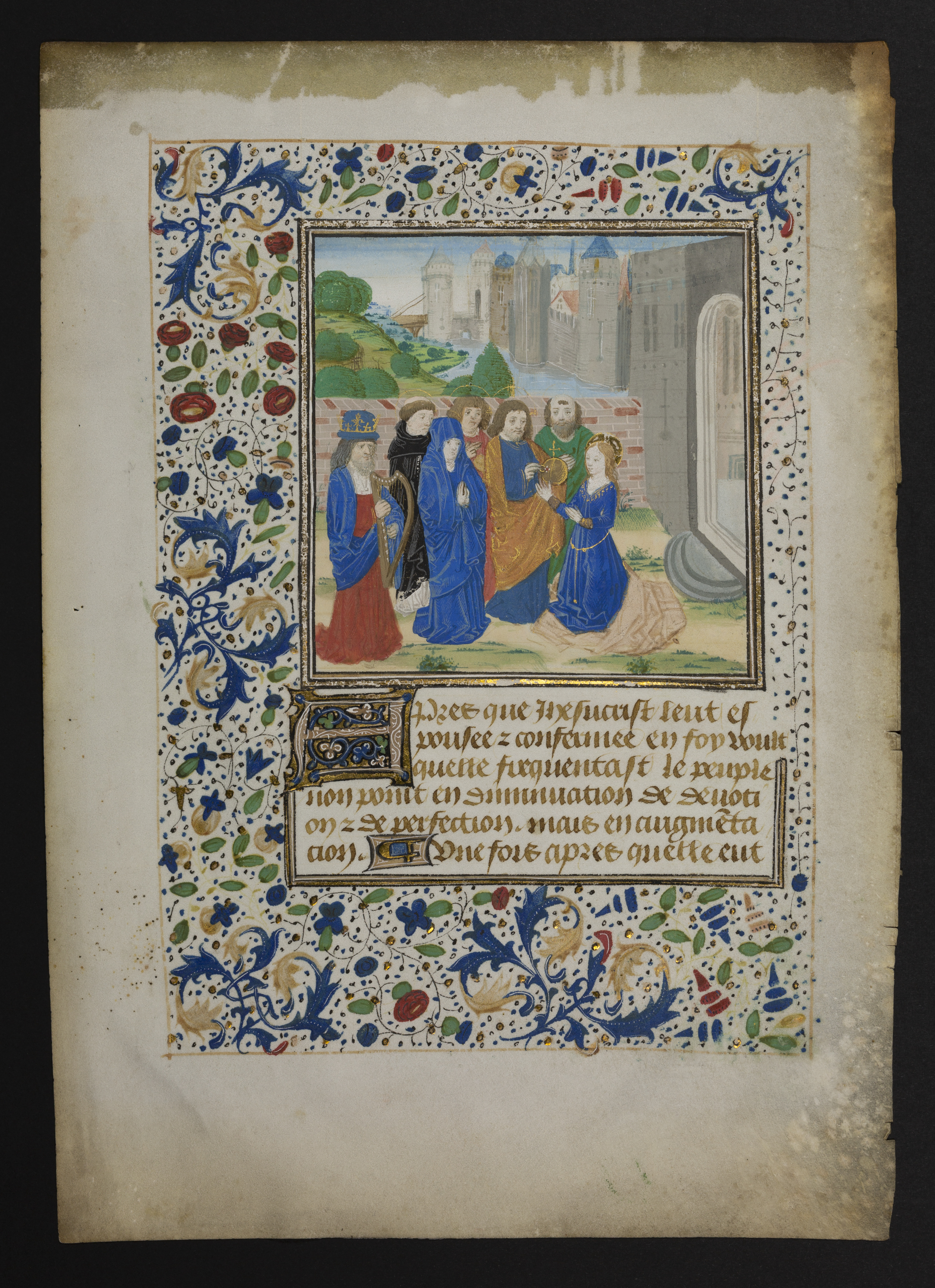
Leaf from an anonymous French translation of the Legenda Major by Raymond of Capua showing the vision of the mystic wedding of Catherine and Christ. (Bruges Public Library, MS 767)

There is some internal evidence of Catherine's personality, teaching and work in her nearly four hundred letters, her Dialogue, and her prayers.

Details about her life have also been drawn from the various sources written shortly after her death to promote her cult and canonisation. Though much of the material is hagiographic, written to promote her sanctity, it is an important early source for historians seeking to reconstruct Catherine's life. Various sources are important, especially the works of Raymond of Capua, who was Catherine's spiritual director and close friend from 1374 to her death and himself became Master General of the Order in 1380. Raymond wrote what is known as the Legenda Major, his Life of Catherine which was completed in 1395, fifteen years after Catherine's death. It was soon translated into other European languages, including German and English.

Another important work written after Catherine's death was Libellus de Supplemento (Little Supplement Book), written between 1412 and 1418 by Tommaso d'Antonio Nacci da Siena (commonly called Thomas of Siena, or Tommaso Caffarini); the work is an expansion of Raymond's Legenda Major making heavy use of the notes of Catherine's first confessor, Tommaso della Fonte, that do not survive anywhere else. Caffarini later published a more compact account of Catherine's life, the Legenda Minor.

From 1411 onward, Caffarini also coordinated the compiling of the Processus of Venice, the set of documents submitted as part of the process of canonisation of Catherine, which provides testimony from nearly all of Catherine's disciples. There is also an anonymous piece, Miracoli della Beata Caterina (Miracle of Blessed Catherine), written by an anonymous Florentine. A few other relevant pieces survive.

== Main sanctuaries ==
The main churches in honour of Catherine of Siena are:

- Santa Maria sopra Minerva in Rome, where her body is preserved.
- Basilica of San Domenico in Siena, where her incorrupt head is preserved.
- Shrine of Saint Catherine in Siena, a complex of religious buildings built around her birthplace.

== Gallery ==
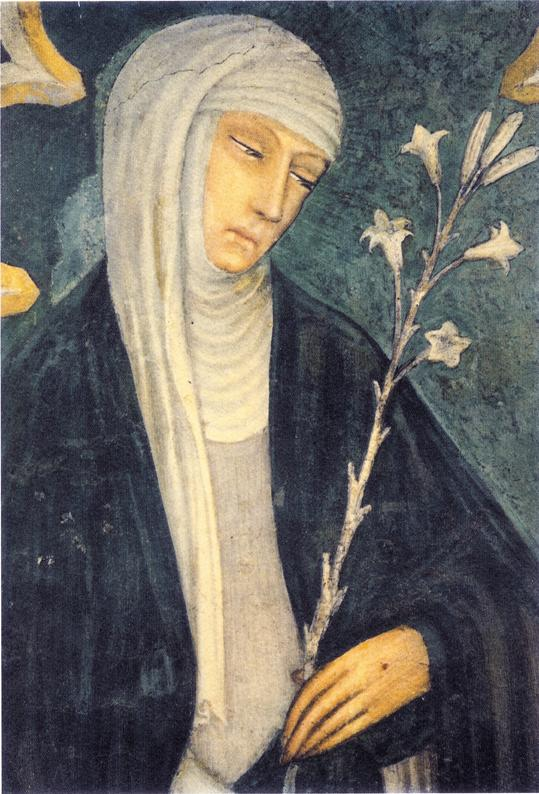
Andrea Vanni, fresco of St. Catherine of Siena (c. 1400)

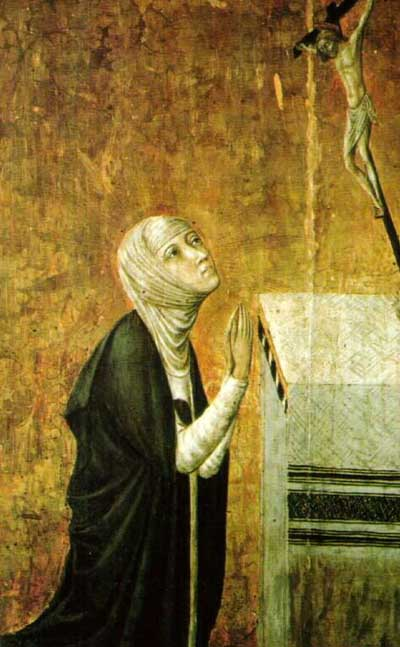
Vecchietta, Arliquiera (1445) detail

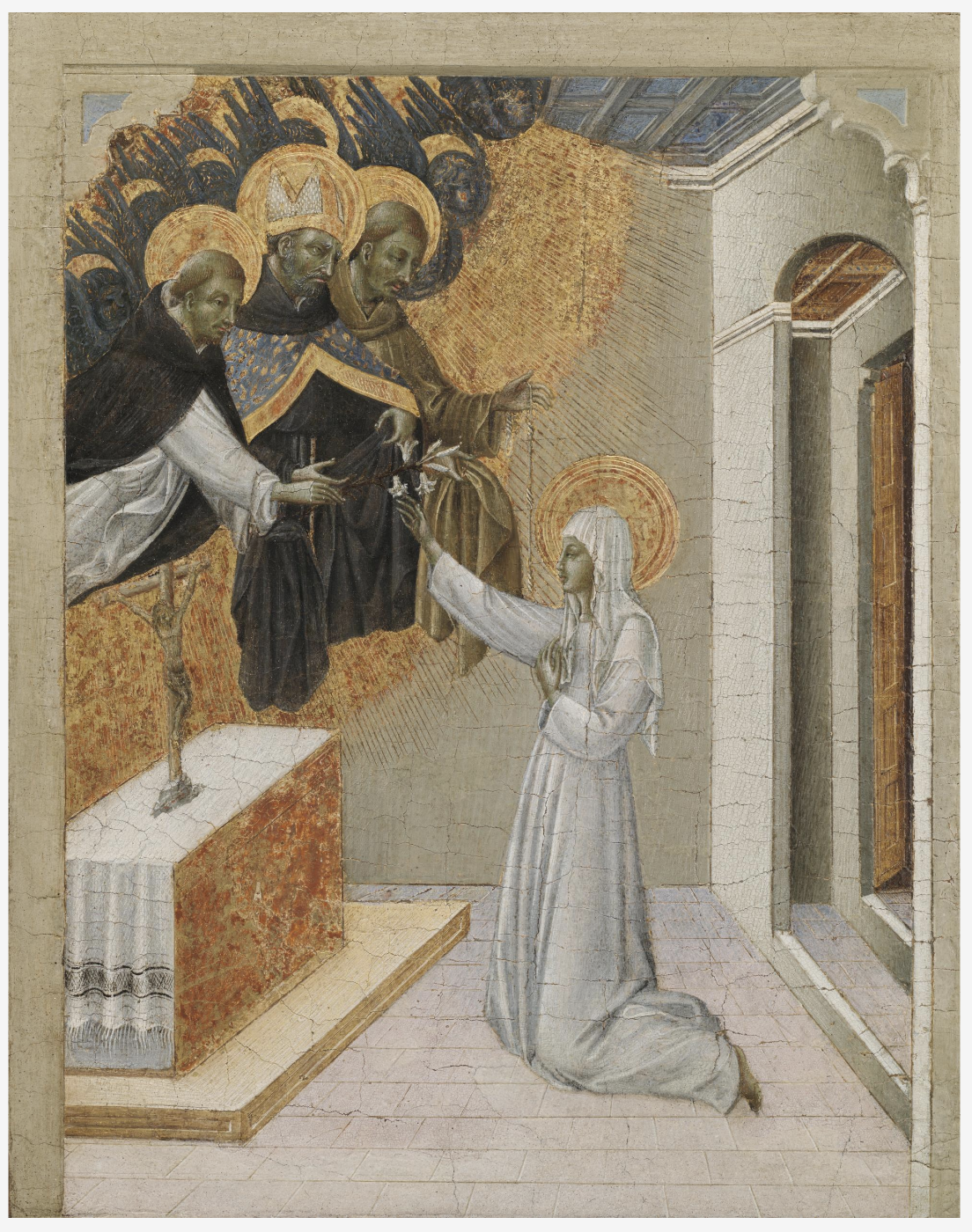
Giovanni di Paolo, Predella Panel from an Altarpiece: St. Catherine of Siena Invested with the Dominican Habit (1460s)

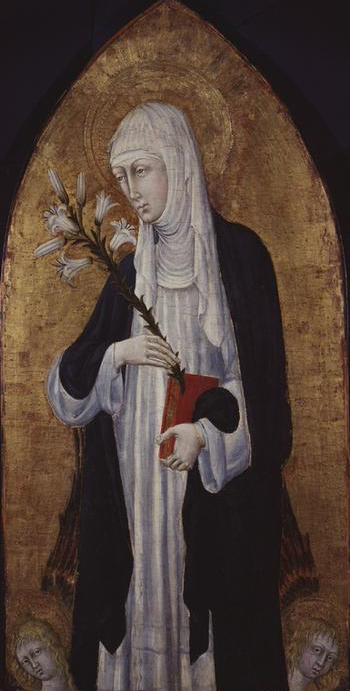
Giovanni di Paolo, St. Catherine of Siena, c. 1475, tempera and gold on panel. Fogg Art Museum, Cambridge, England.

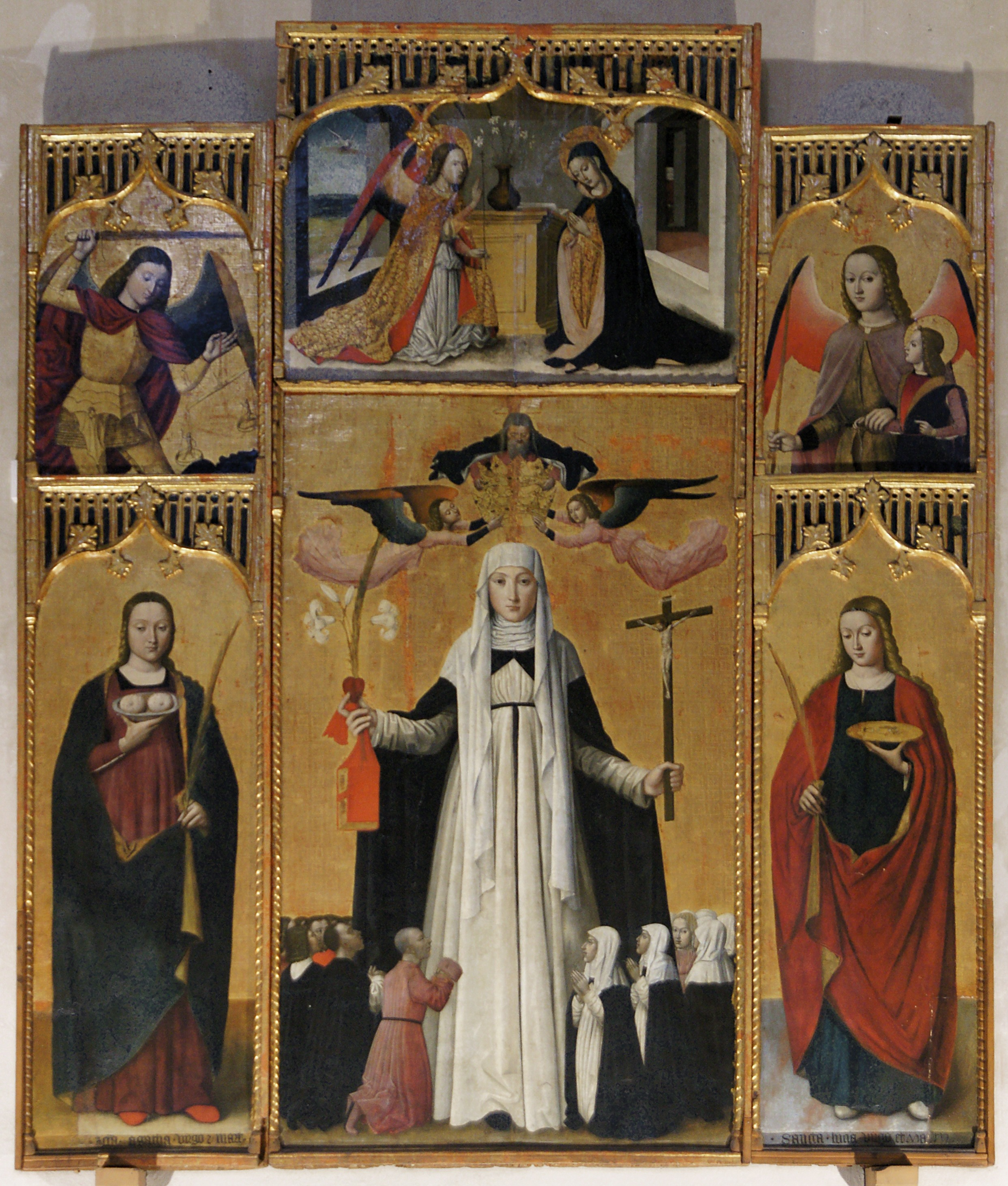
Ludovico Brea (attr.), St. Catherine of Siena (1488)

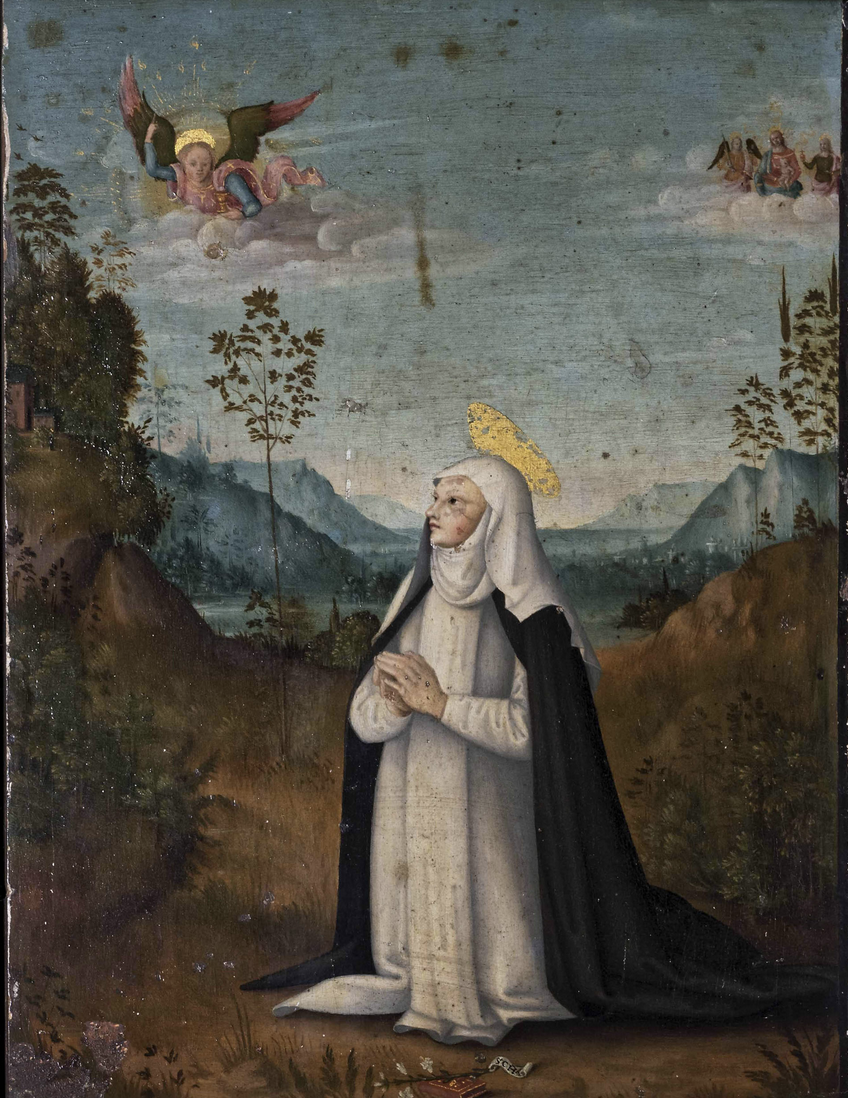
Bernardino Fungai, Communion of Saint Catherine of Siena (1490s)

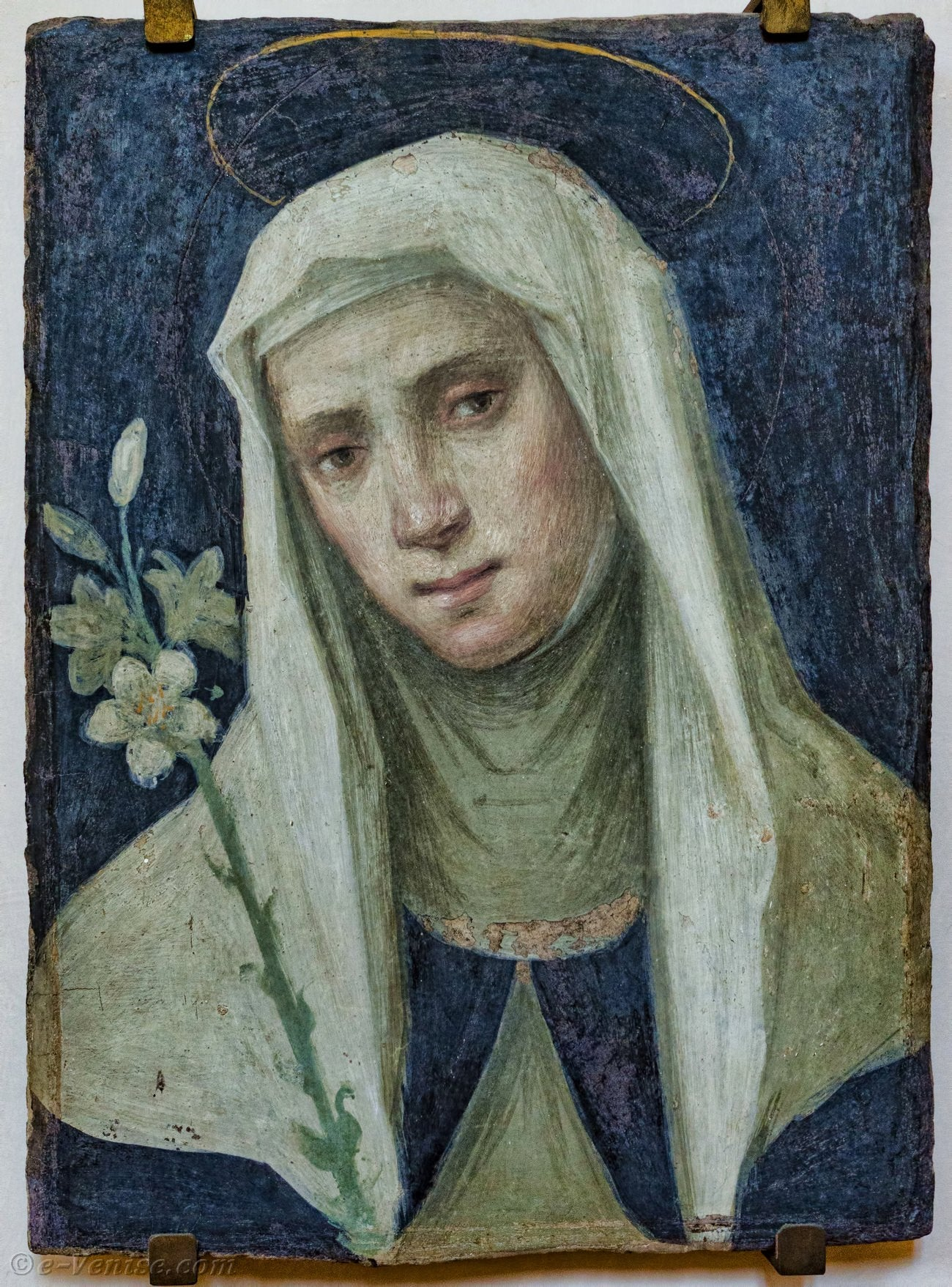
Fra Bartolomeo, Saint Catherine of Siena (1509)

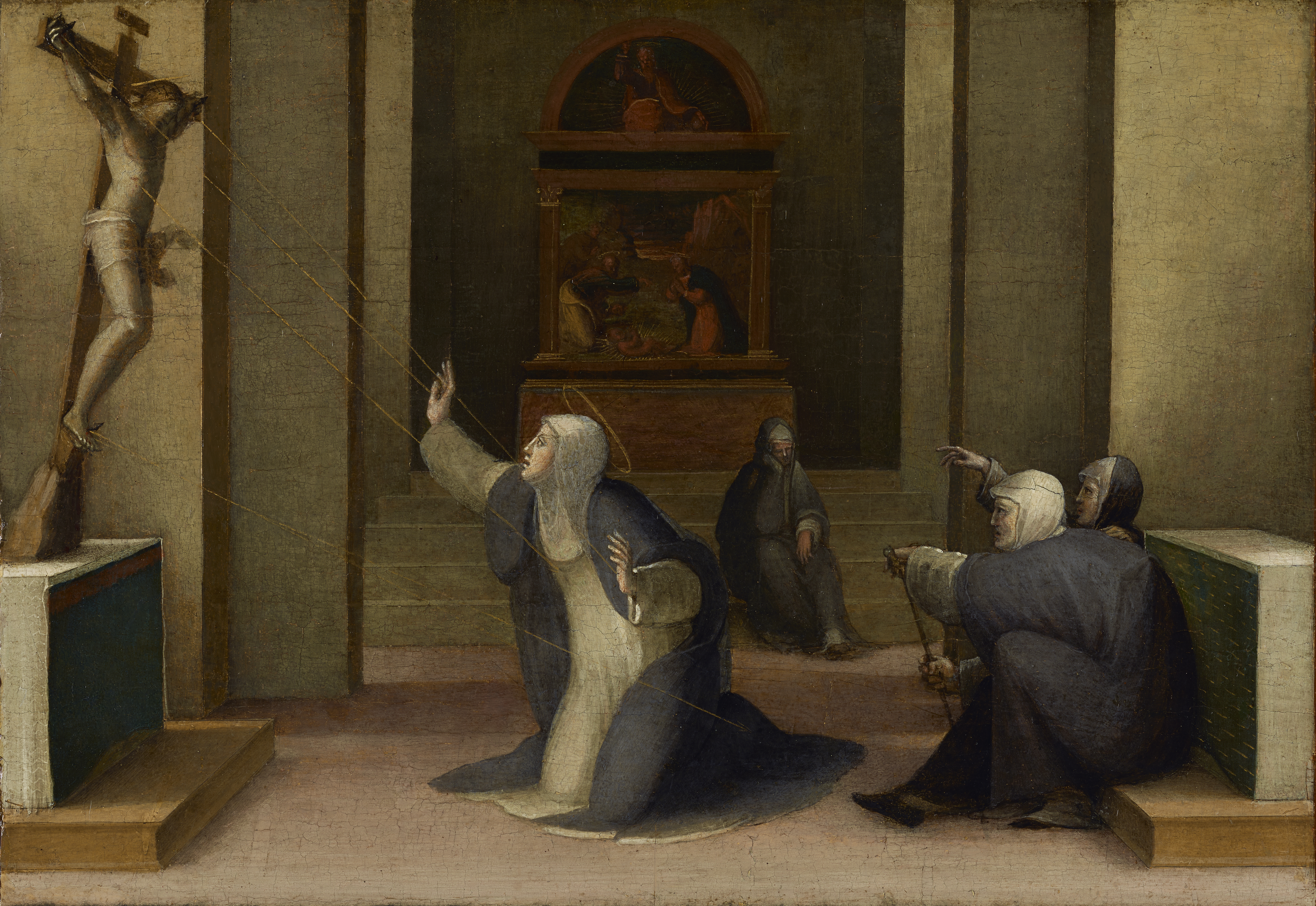
Domenico Beccafumi, Saint Catherine of Siena Receiving the Stigmata (1513–15)

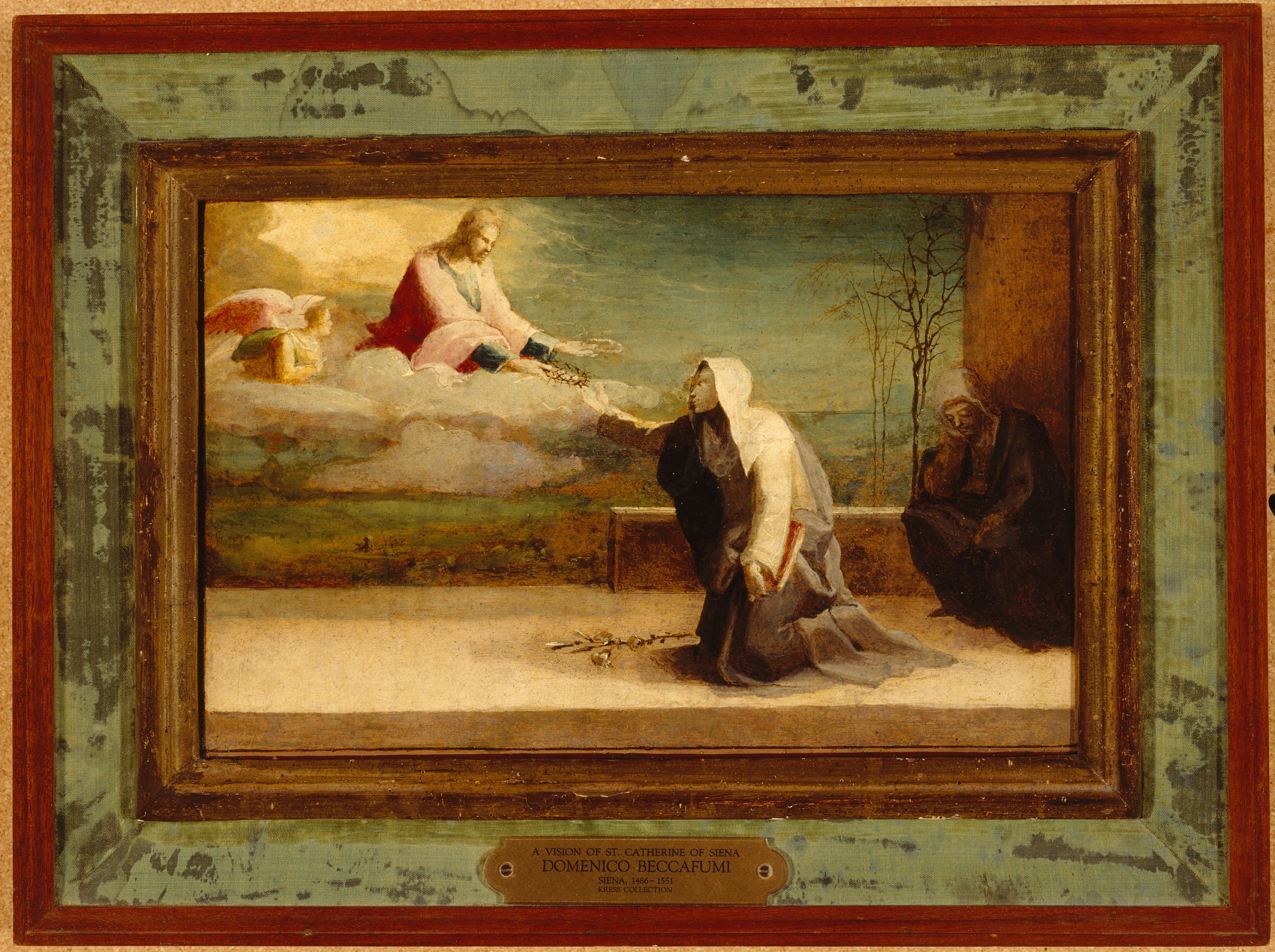
Domenico Beccafumi, A Vision of Saint Catherine of Siena (1528)

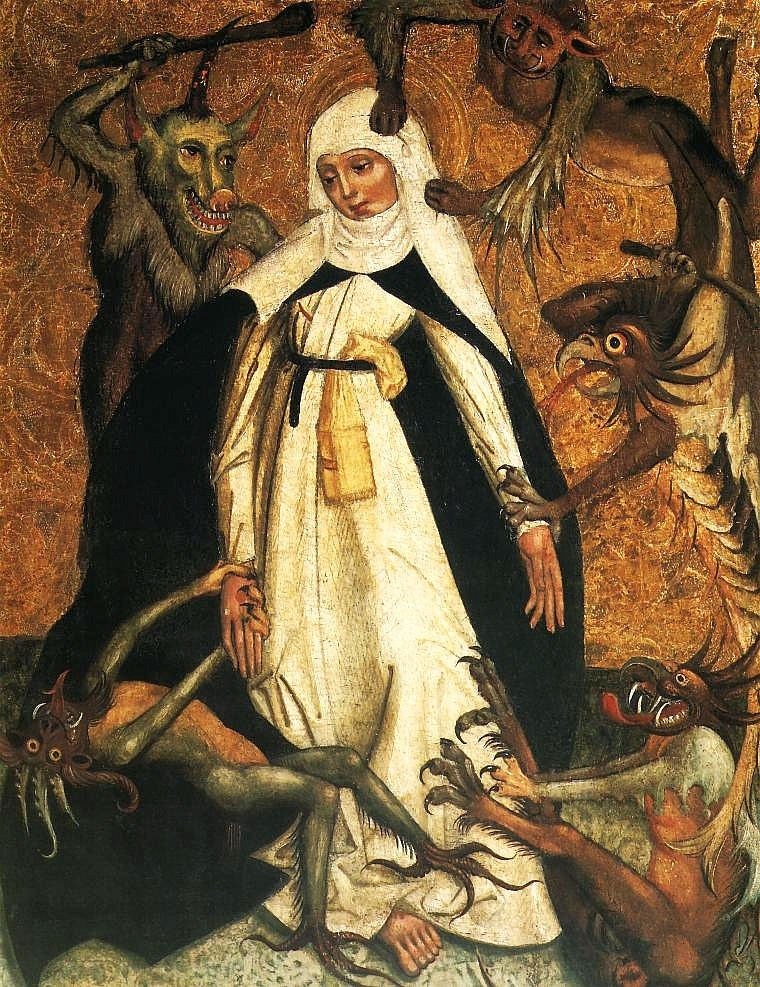
St Catherine and the Demons by an unknown artist, c. 1500, tempera on panel. National Museum, Warsaw.

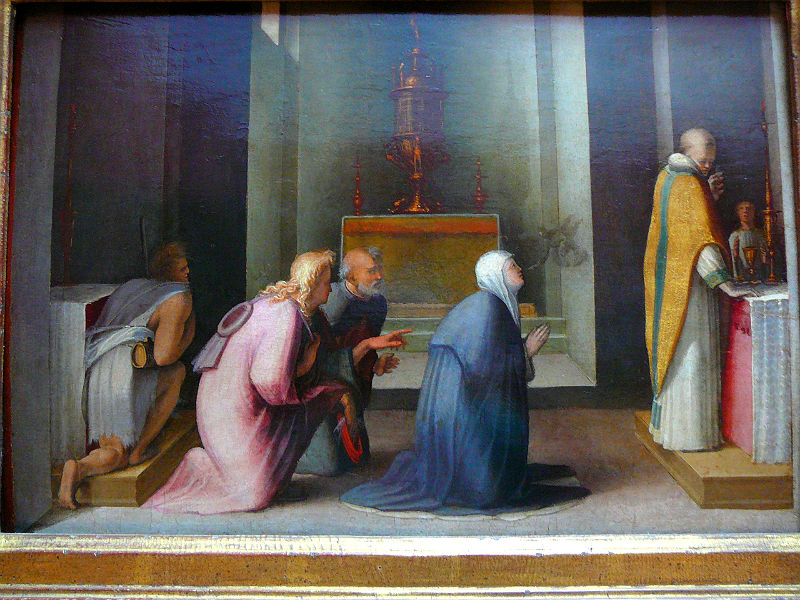
Domenico Beccafumi, The Miraculous Communion of St. Catherine of Siena, c. 1513–1515, Getty Center, Los Angeles, California

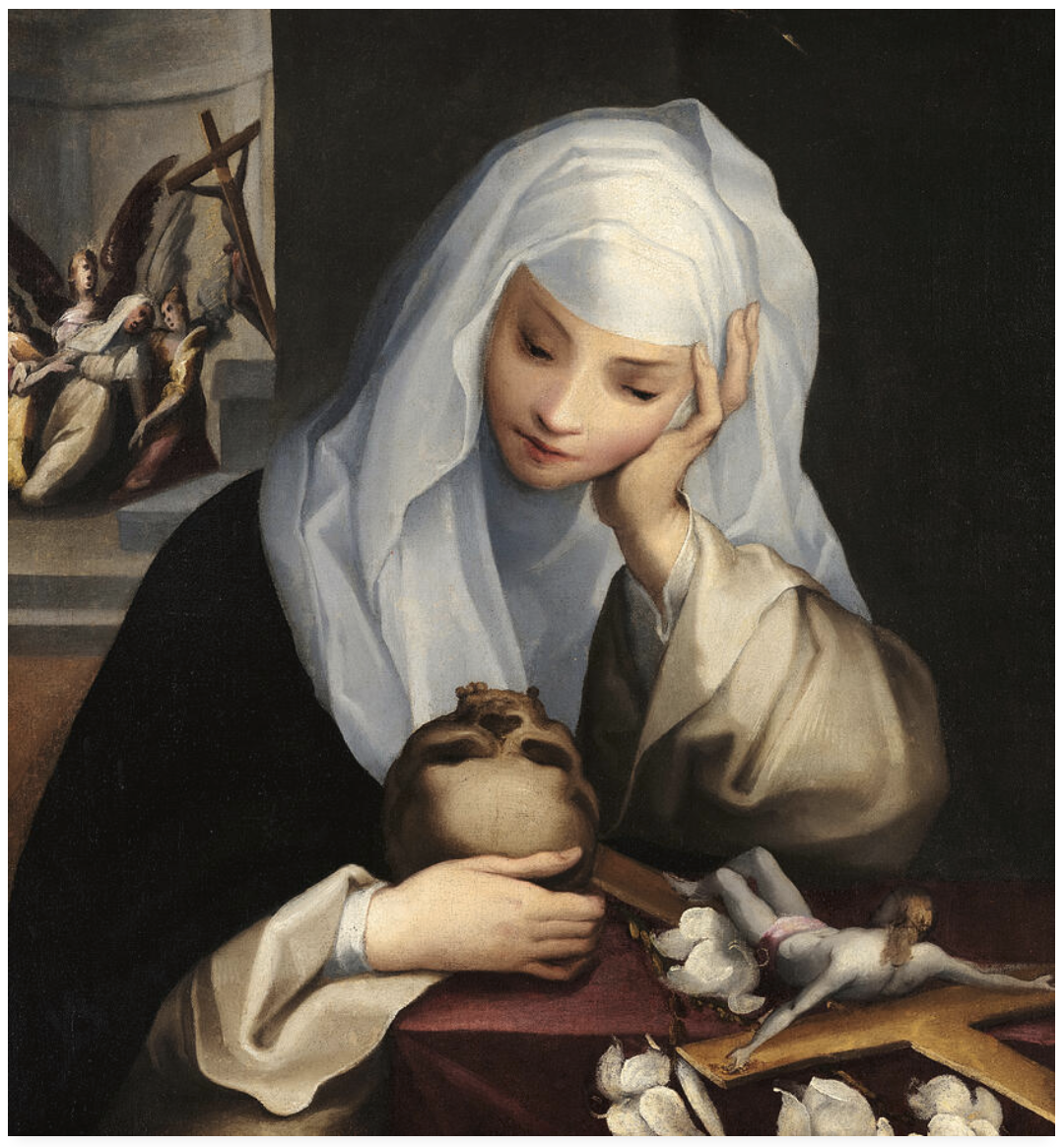
Francesco Vanni, Saint Catherine of Siena (1566)

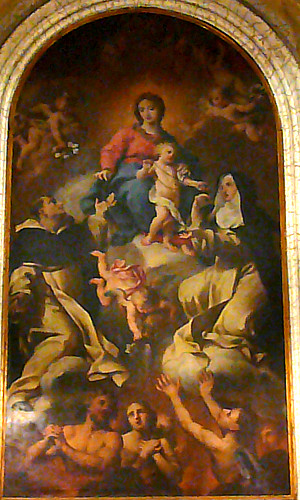
The Virgin Mary Giving the Rosary to St. Dominic and St. Catherine of Siena, Church of Santa Agata in Trastevere, Rome (Bottom of painting: the souls in Purgatory await the prayers of the faithful) (possibly 16th century)

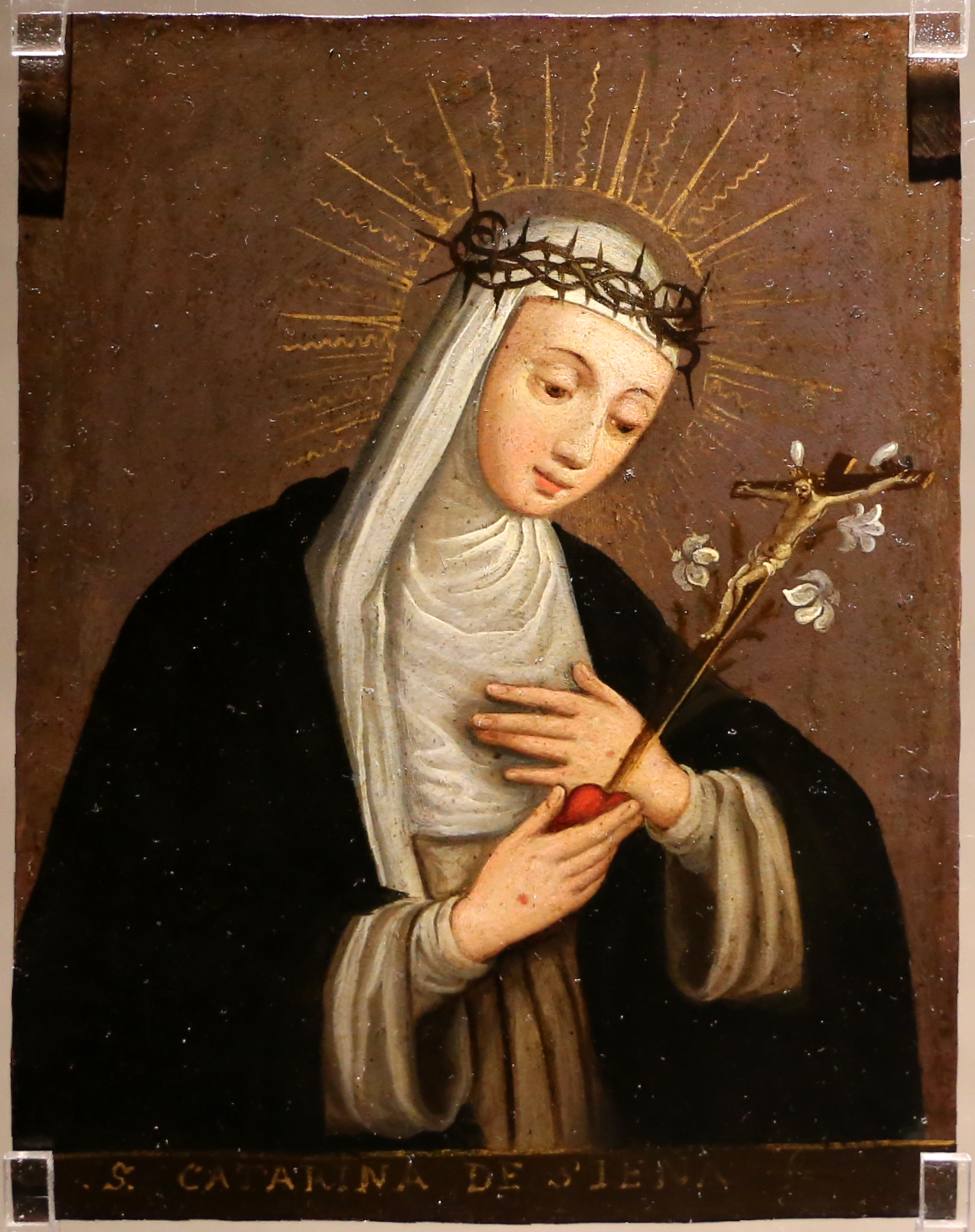
Plautilla Nelli (attr.), St. Catherine of Siena (16th c.)

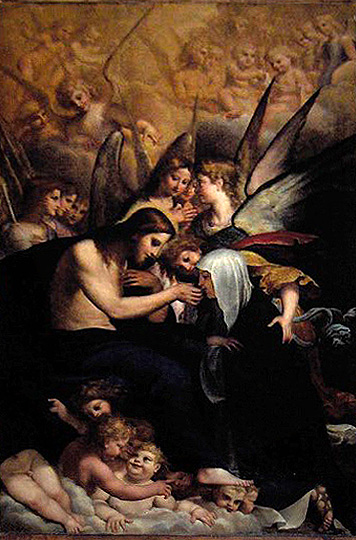
St Catherine's mystic communion by Francesco Brizzi (1615)

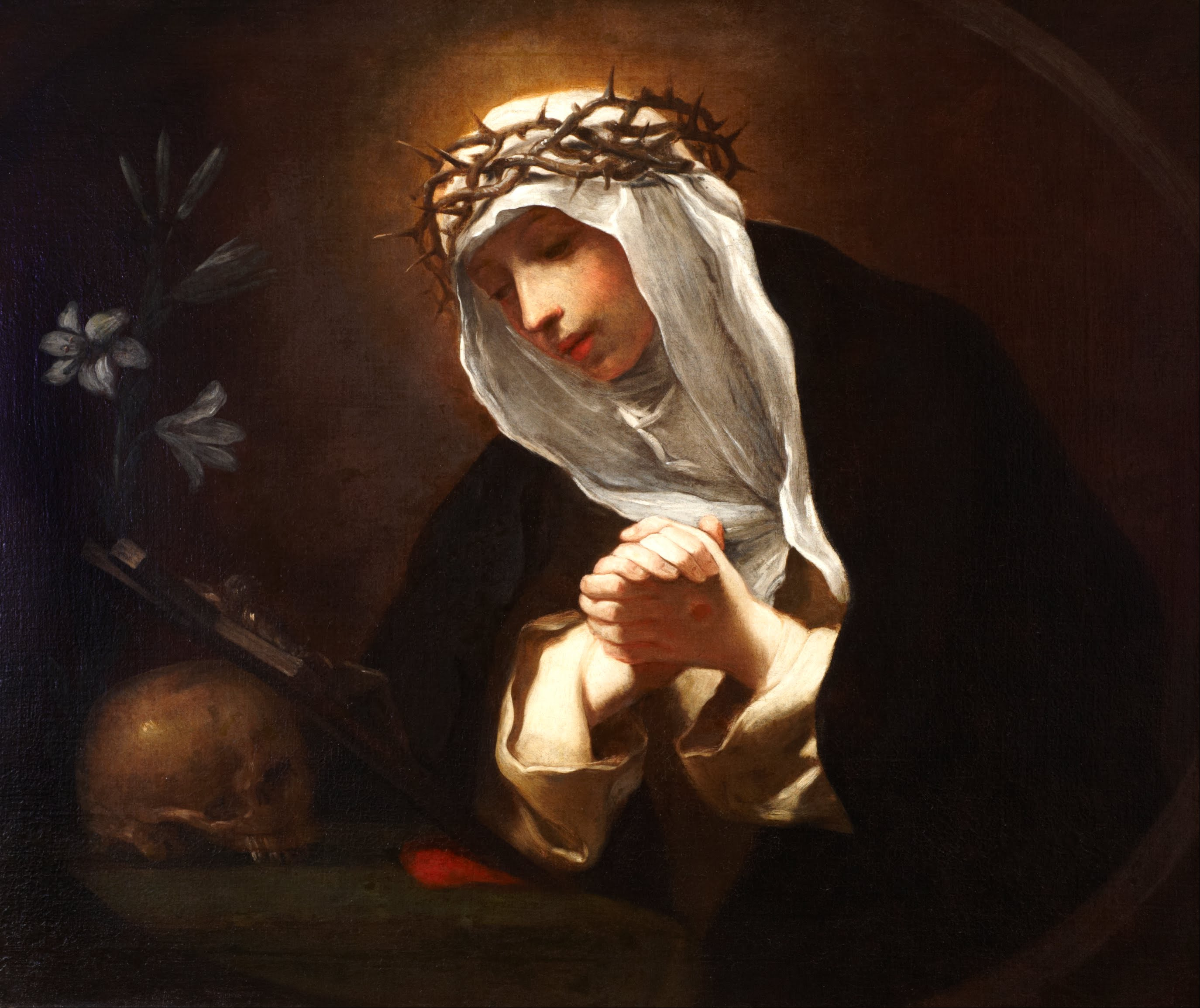
Baldassare Franceschini, Saint Catherine of Siena, 17th century, Dulwich Picture Gallery

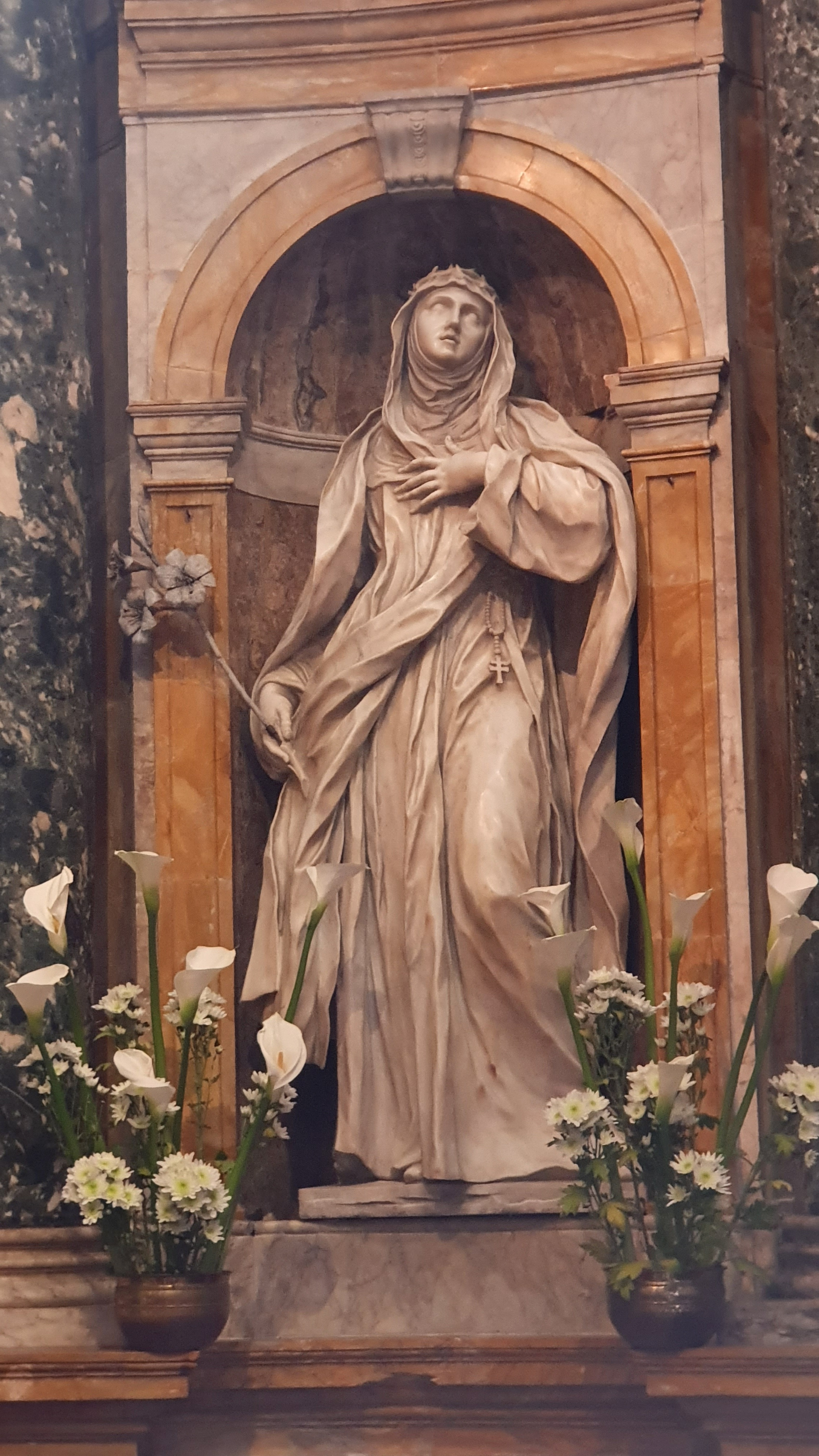
Ercole Ferrata, St. Catherine of Siena (1660s)

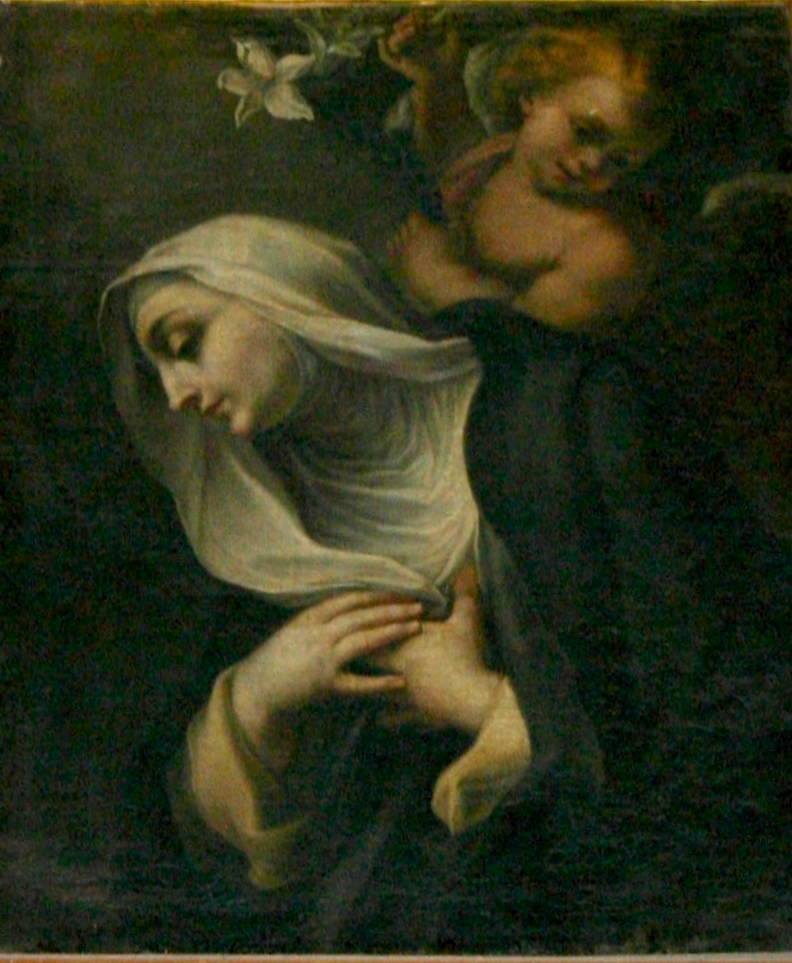
Painting of St. Catherine of Siena (17th c.)

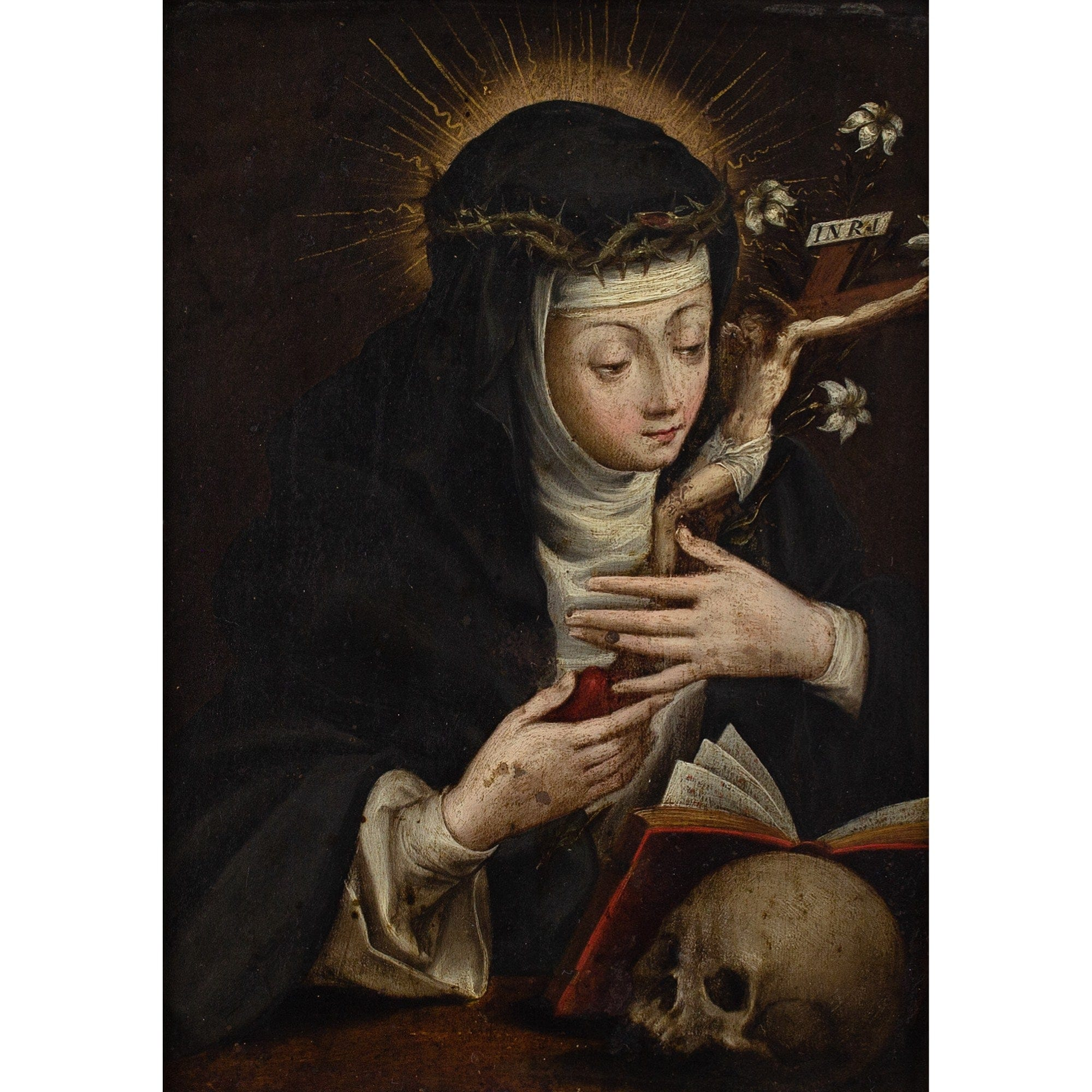
Saint Catherine Of Siena, 17th-Century Flemish School

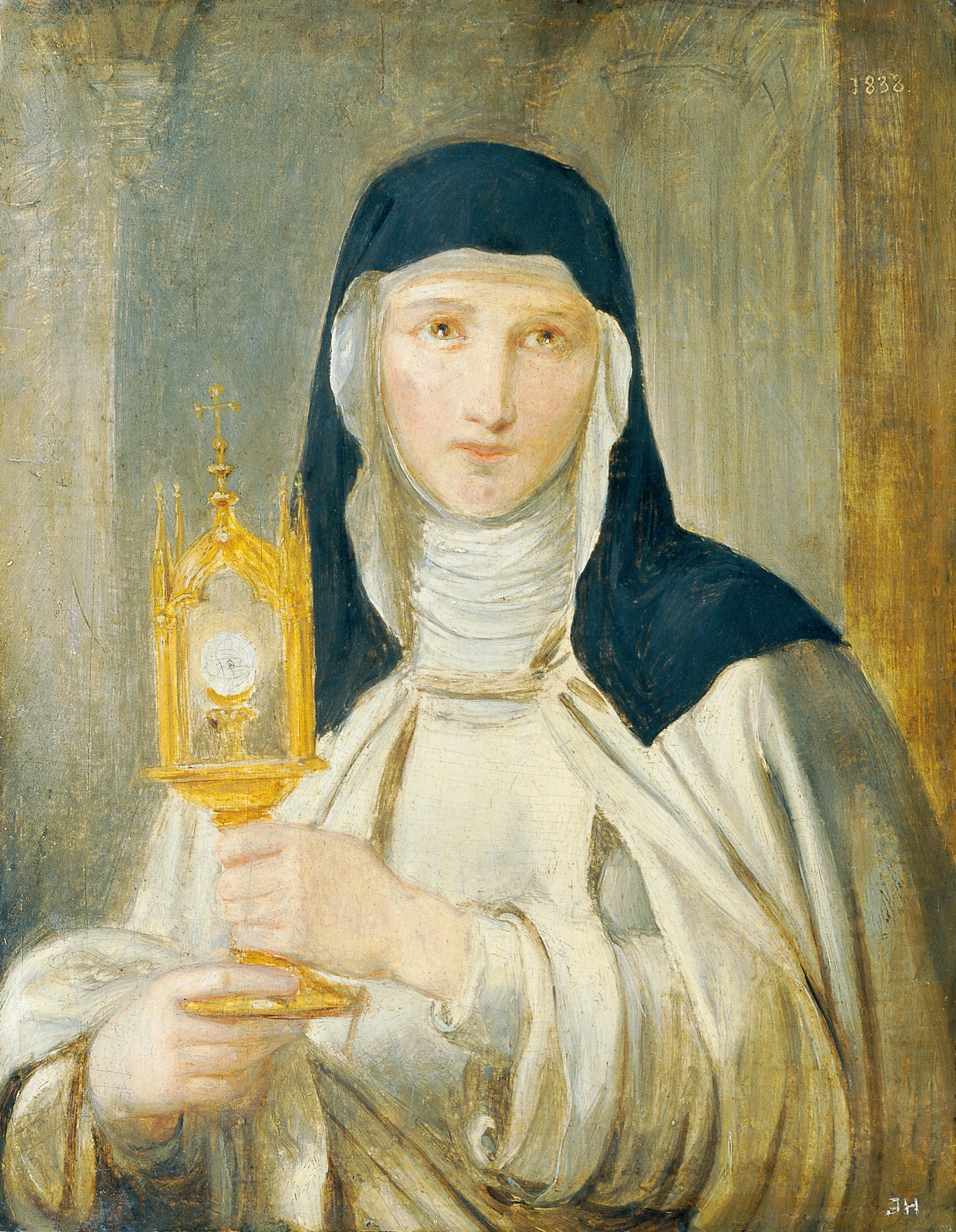
Joseph Hasslwander, St. Catherine with Monstrance (1838)

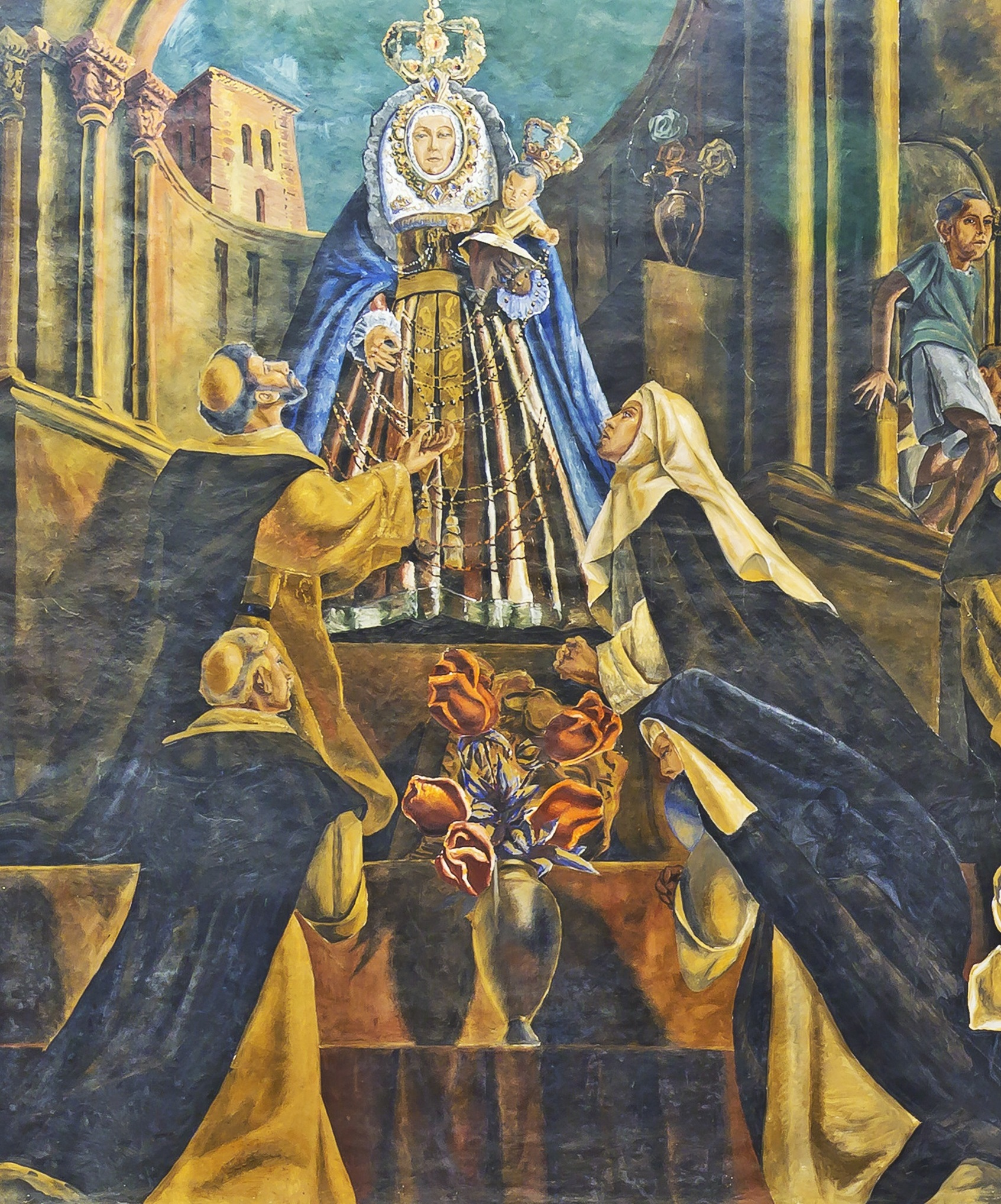
This painting depicts the Virgin giving the rosary to St. Dominic; in the scene also appear Fray Pedro de Santa María Ulloa, Saint Catherine of Siena and Servant of God, Mary of Jesus de León y Delgado. The fresco is located in the Church of Santo Domingo in San Cristóbal de La Laguna, Tenerife, Spain.

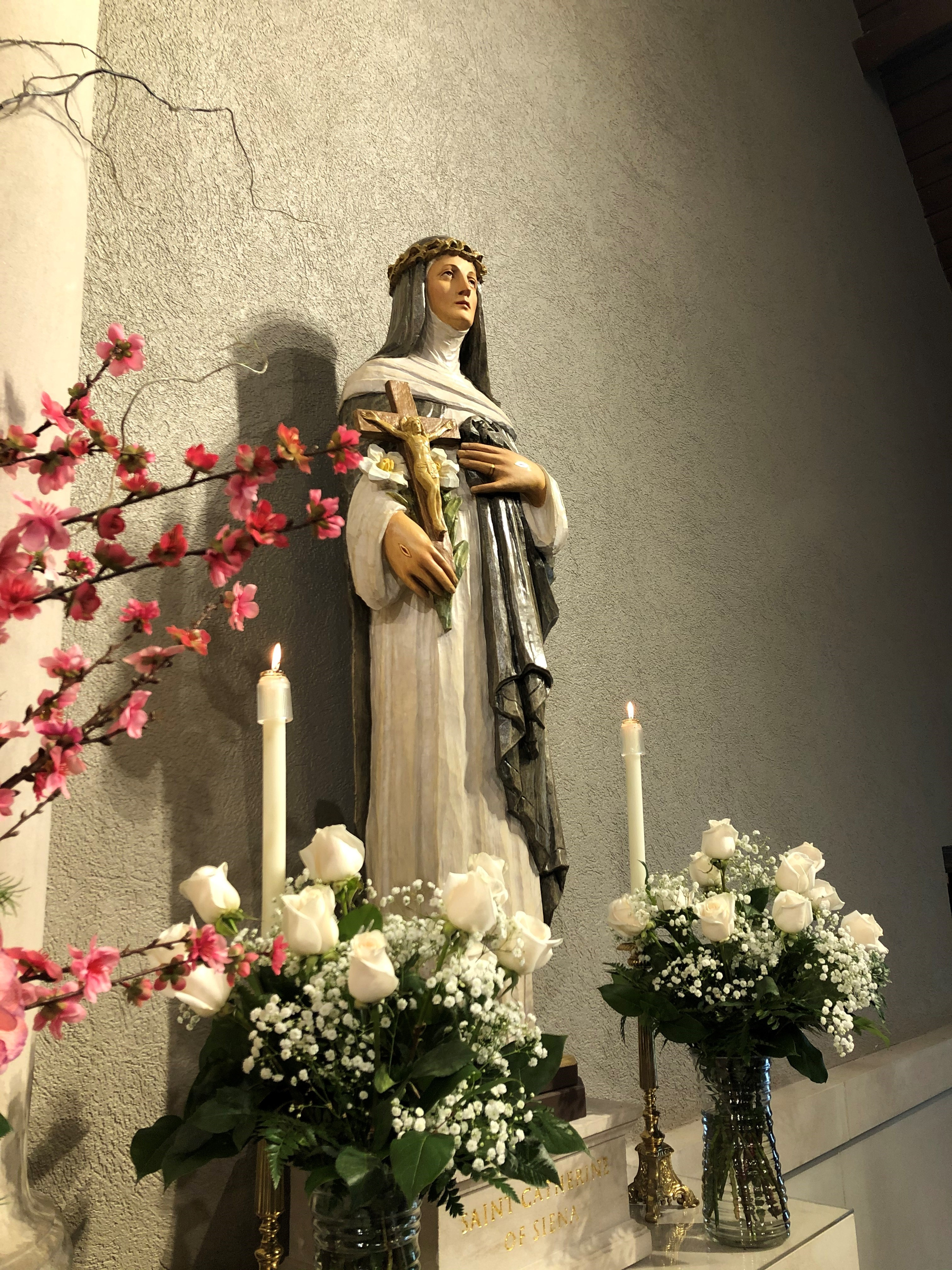
A statue of St. Catherine of Siena at the Parish of St. Catherine of Siena Church in Trumbull, Connecticut

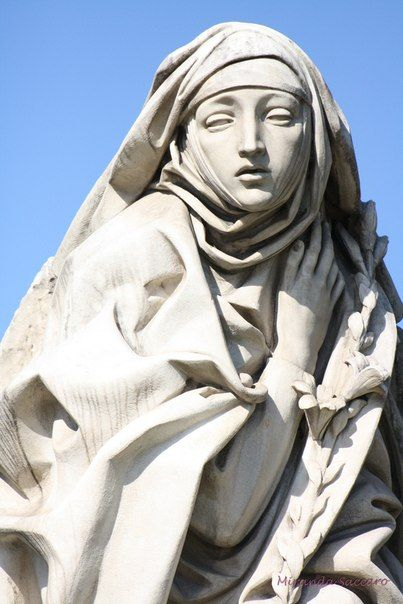
Francesco Messina, St. Catherine of Siena (1961)

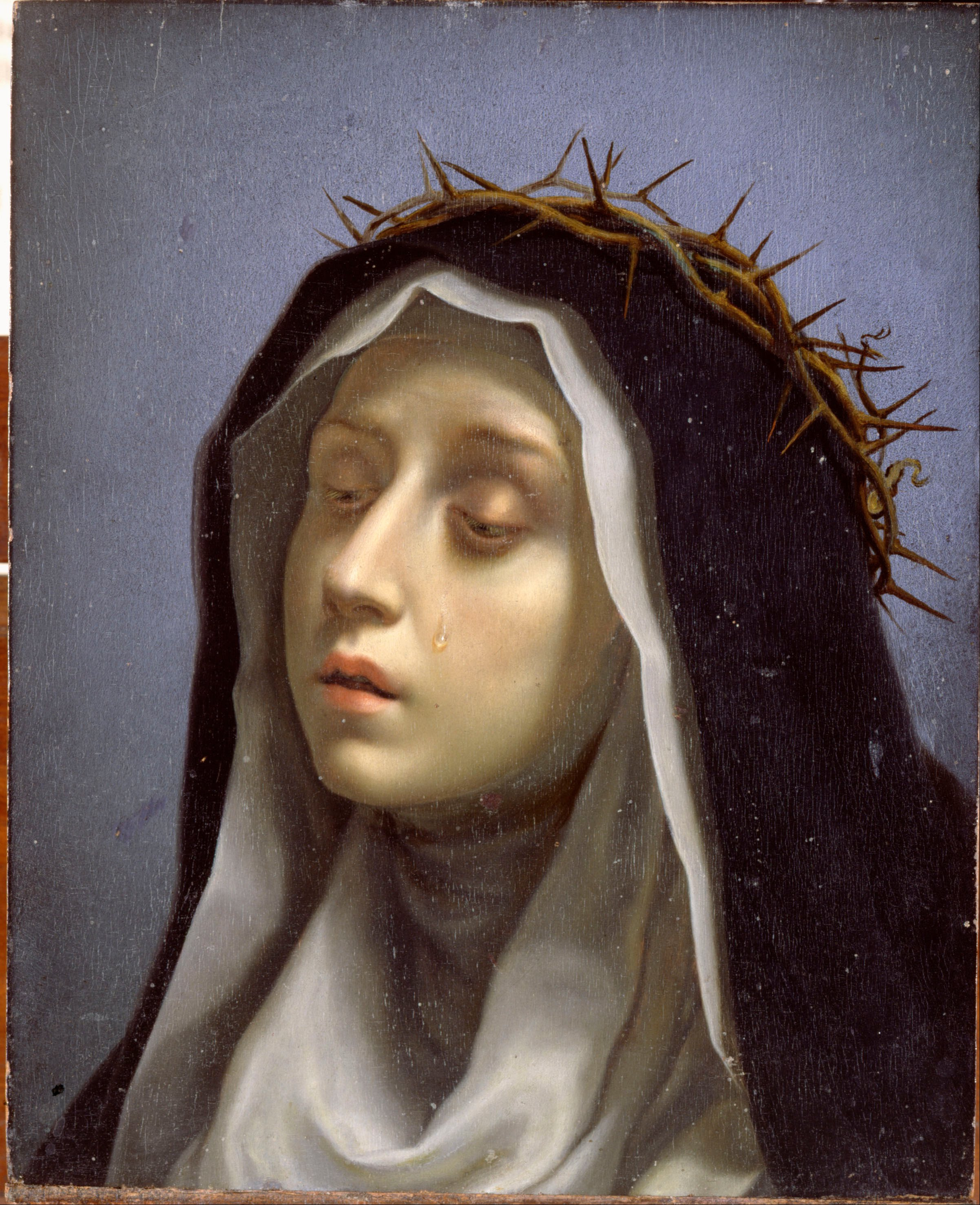
Saint Catherine of Siena by Carlo Dolci

== Bibliography ==
=== Modern editions and English translations ===
- The Italian critical edition of the Dialogue is Catherine of Siena, Il Dialogo della divina Provvidenza: ovvero Libro della divina dottrina, 2nd edition, edited by Giuliana Cavallini (Siena: Cantagalli, 1995; 1st edition, 1968). Cavallini demonstrated that the standard division of the Dialogue in into four treatises entitled the 'Treatise on Discretion', 'On Prayer', 'On Providence', and 'On Obedience', was in fact a result of a misreading of the text in the 1579 edition of the Dialogue. Modern editors and translators, including Noffke (1980), have followed Cavallini in rejecting this fourfold division.
- The Italian critical edition of the 26 Prayers is Catherine of Siena, Le Orazioni, edited bt Giuliana Cavallini (Rome: Cateriniane, 1978)
- The most recent Italian critical edition of the Letters is Le lettere di Santa Caterina da Siena: l'edizione di Eugenio Duprè Theseider e i nuovi problemi, (2002), edited by Antonio Volpato

English translations of The Dialogue include:

- The Dialogue, trans. Suzanne Noffke, OP Paulist Press (Classics of Western Spirituality), 1980.
- The Dialogue of St. Catherine of Siena, TAN Books, 2009. ISBN 978-0-89555-149-8
- Phyllis Hodgson and Gabriel M. Liegey, eds., The Orcherd of Syon, (London; New York: Oxford University Press, 1966) [A Middle English translation of the Dialogo from the early fifteenth century, first printed in 1519].

The Letters are translated into English as:

- Catherine of Siena (1988). Suzanne Noffke (ed.). The Letters of St. Catherine of Siena. Vol. 4. Binghamton: Center for Medieval and Early Renaissance Studies, State University of New York at Binghamton. ISBN 978-0-86698-036-4. (Republished as The letters of Catherine of Siena, 4 vols, trans Suzanne Noffke, (Tempe, Arizona: Arizona Center for Medieval and Renaissance Studies, 2000–2008))

The Prayers are translated into English as:

- The Prayers of Catherine of Siena, trans. Suzanne Noffke, 2nd edn 1983, (New York, 2001)

Raymond of Capua's Life was translated into English in 1493 and 1609, and in Modern English is translated as:

- Raymond of Capua (1980). Conleth Kearns (ed.). The Life of Catherine of Siena. Wilmington: Glazier. ISBN 978-0-89453-151-4.

Letter Excerpts translated into English:

- Letter Excerpts, translations by Diana L. Villegas, PhD from the Volpato critical edition.

== See also ==
- Biblioteca Comunale degli Intronati – Library in Italy
- Saint Catherine of Siena, patron saint archive
- Churches dedicated to Catherine of Siena

== Sources ==
- Raymond of Capua (1862). Life of Saint Catharine of Sienna . P. J. Kenedy & Sons.
- Blessed Raymond of Capua (2003). The Life of St. Catherine of Siena. Translated by Lamb, George. Rockford, Illinois: TAN Books.
- Catherine of Siena (1980). The Dialogue. Translated by Noffke, Suzanne. New York: Paulist Press. ISBN 978-0-8091-2233-2.
- Hollister, Warren; Bennett, Judith (2002). Medieval Europe: A Short History (9 ed.). Boston, Massachusetts: McGraw-Hill Companies Incorporated. ISBN 9780072346572.
- Skårderud, Finn (2008). "Hellig anoreksi Sult og selvskade som religiøse praksiser. Caterina av Siena (1347–80)". Tidsskrift for Norsk Psykologforening (in Norwegian). 45 (4): 408–420.
