= St. Catherine of Siena Church and School =

Saint Catherine of Siena Catholic Church
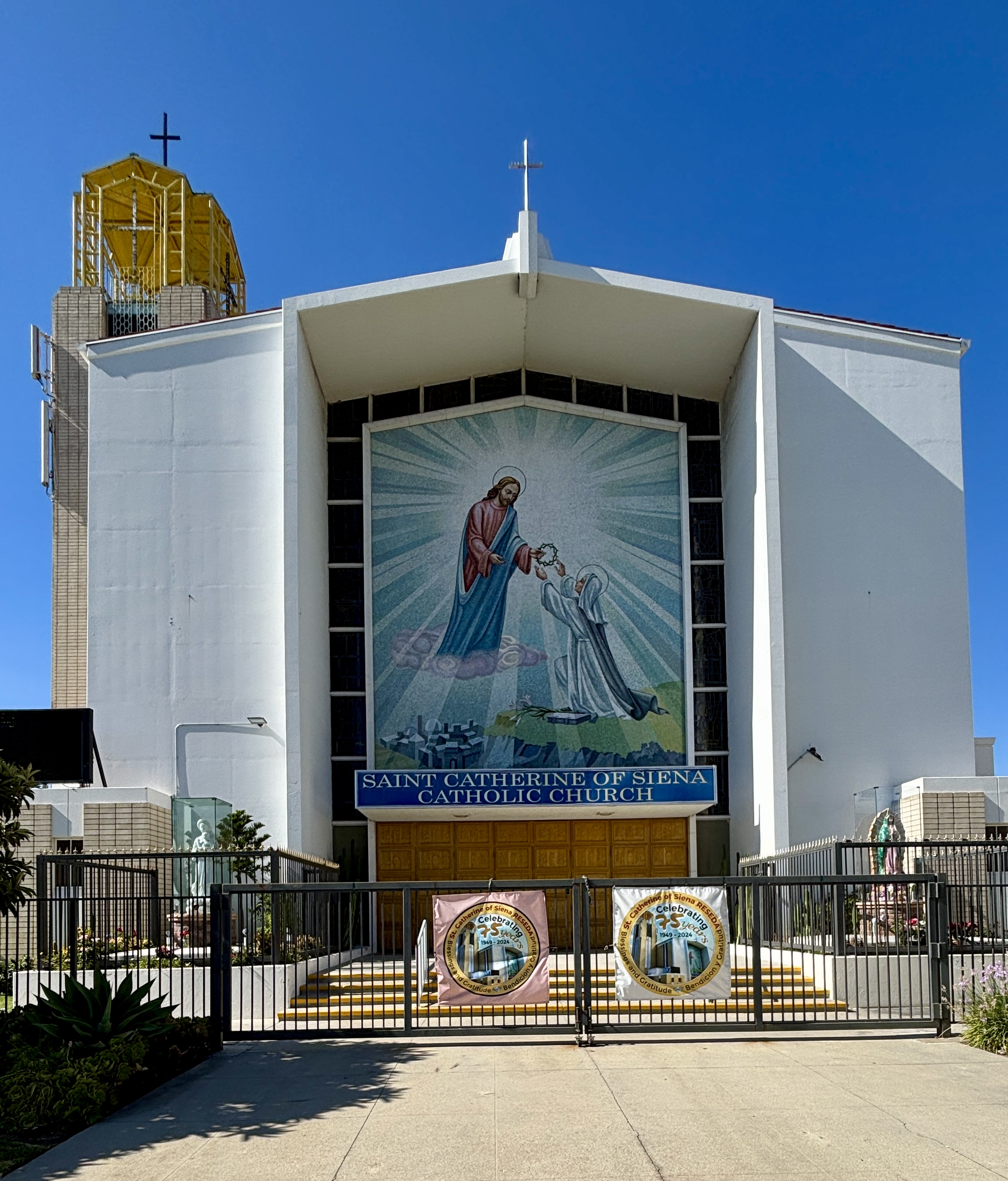
- Saint Catherine of Siena Catholic Church
- 34.20167°N 118.52816°W
- Location: Reseda, California
- Country: USA
- Denomination: Roman Catholic
- Website: https://www.catherineofsienaparish.org/

History
- Founded: 1949

Administration
- Diocese: Archdiocese of Los Angeles

Clergy
- Priest: Rev. Anselm Nwakuna
- Pastor: Rev. Mauricio Goloran III

St. Catherine of Siena is a Catholic church and elementary school (kindergarten through eighth grade) located on Sherman Way in Reseda, California, in the city of Los Angeles. The parish, which is now more than 50 percent Latino, has a membership of more than 1,300 families.

== Parish history ==
The parish was established in 1949 by Monsignor John Hackett. It originally included areas that later became parishes of St. Bridget of Sweden Church, Our Lady of Lourdes, and a large portion of St. Joseph the Worker parish. When the parish was first established, and before the first parish church was built, Mass was celebrated in the Reseda Theater just down Sherman Way. In 1950, church services were moved to the building that now serves as the parish hall.

Due to the population growth in the San Fernando Valley, the parish has been divided several times. In 1955, the territory east of Louise formed the new parish of St. Bridget of Sweden. The parish was again divided with the territory west of Vanalden forming part of the new parish of St. Joseph the Worker in 1956.

The parish moved into the large modern church fronting Sherman Way for Easter Mass in 1966. The church was damaged in the 1994 Northridge earthquake, which devastated much of the surrounding area. The church was deemed unsafe after the earthquake, and the parish hall, after some repairs, once again served as the church for a year while repairs were made to the church.

Monsignor Hackett remained the pastor at St. Catherine's from its founding in 1949 until his retirement in 1981. In 1988, Monsignor Hackett died of Parkinson's disease and the parish hall was renamed in his honor. Monsignor Sean Flanagan became the new pastor in 1981 and remained there until 2002. Father Paul Vigil took over as the pastor at St. Catherine's in 2002.

When St. Catherine's celebrated its 50th anniversary in 1999, Cardinal Roger Mahony joined Monsignor Flanagan in presiding over the 50th anniversary Mass. At the time, Father Flanagan told the Los Angeles Daily News: "Look out at that Mass and you'll see the changes that have taken place over the last 50 years, not only in our parish but in Los Angeles." Nearly 2,000 parishioners squeezed into the church and attended a boisterous reception, featuring strolling guitarists and homemade cookies, in the church's parking lot.

== School history ==
The parish opened a school staffed by the Sisters of St. Joseph of Carondelet in 1952 and added 12 classrooms during the following six years. In 1956, additions to the school and convent were made. By the early 1960s, as the population of the San Fernando Valley exploded, the school had two classrooms for each grade level, one through eight, with 50 to 55 students in each classroom. In 1971, the school began phasing out one classroom each year. The program continued, and the school became an eight-classroom school in 1978. The school is among six elementary schools in the Roman Catholic Archdiocese of Los Angeles that will close in June 2021.

== See also ==
- San Fernando Pastoral Region
