= Julian of Norwich =

English anchoress (c. 1343 – after 1416)

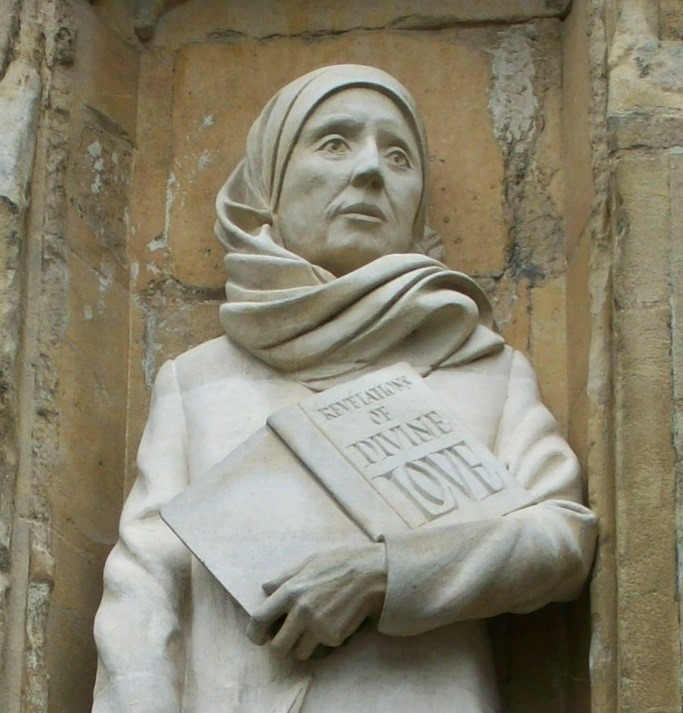
- David Holgate's statue of Julian, outside Norwich Cathedral, completed in 2000
- Born: c. 1343
- Died: after 1416; Norwich, England
- Occupations: Theologian; anchoress; mystic
- Notable work: Revelations of Divine Love
- Theological work
- Language: Middle English

Julian of Norwich (c. 1343 (Note: Sources do not all agree on the year that Julian of Norwich was born; Windeatt gives late 1342; Ramirez states she was born "around 1343".) – after 1416), also known as Juliana of Norwich, the Lady Julian, Dame Julian or Mother Julian, was a medieval English Catholic anchoress. Her writings, now known as Revelations of Divine Love, are the earliest surviving English-language works attributed to a woman. They are also the only surviving English-language works by an anchoress.

Julian lived in the English city of Norwich in Norfolk, an important centre for commerce that also had a vibrant religious life. During her lifetime, the city suffered the devastating effects of the Black Death of 1348–1350, the Peasants' Revolt (which affected large parts of England in 1381), and the suppression of the Lollards. In 1373, aged 30 and so seriously ill she thought she was on her deathbed, Julian received a series of visions or shewings of the Passion of Christ. She recovered from her illness and wrote two versions of her experiences, the earlier one being completed soon after her recovery—a much longer version, today known as the Long Text, was written many years later.

Julian lived in permanent seclusion as an anchoress in her cell attached to St Julian's Church, Norwich. Four wills are known in which sums were bequeathed to a Norwich anchoress named Julian, and an account by the celebrated mystic Margery Kempe exists which provides evidence of counsel Kempe was given by the anchoress.

Details of Julian's family, education, or of her life before becoming an anchoress are not known; it is unclear whether her actual name was Julian. Preferring to write anonymously, and seeking isolation from the world, she was nevertheless influential in her lifetime. While her writings were carefully preserved, the Reformation prevented their publication in print. The Long Text was first published in 1670 by the Benedictine monk Serenus de Cressy, reissued by George Hargreaves Parker in 1843, and published in a modernised version in 1864. Julian's writings emerged from obscurity in 1901 when a manuscript in the British Museum was transcribed and published with notes by Grace Warrack; many translations have been made since. Julian is today considered to be an important Christian mystic and theologian.

== Background ==
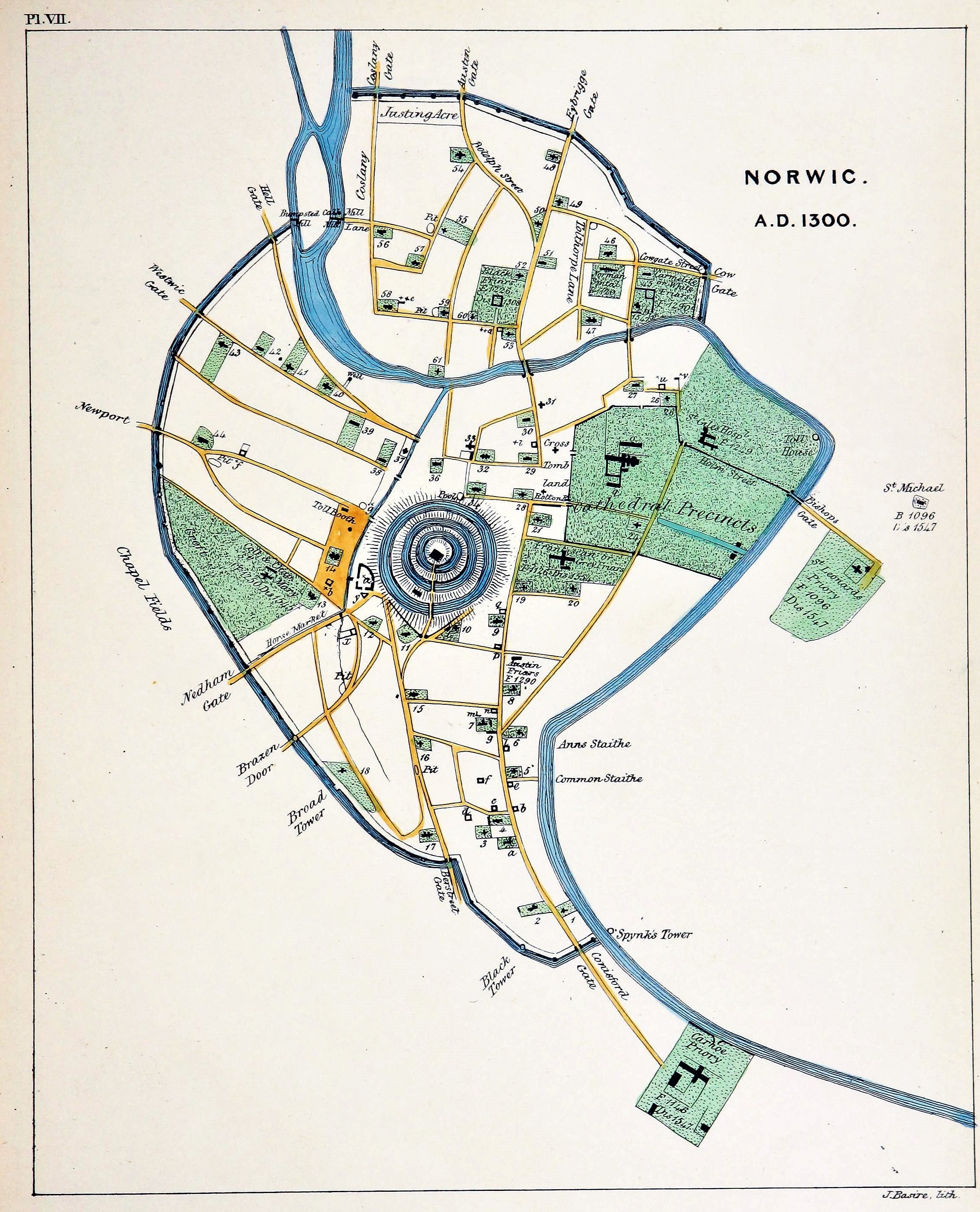
Map of 14th-century Norwich (c. 1300) by Samuel Woodward (1847); St Julian's Church, towards the south of the map, is circled in red, on the west bank of the Yare.

The English city of Norwich, where Julian probably lived all her life, was second in importance to London during the 13th and 14th centuries, and the centre of the country's primary region for agriculture and trade. (Note: A lack of data about Norwich's population during this period in its history means that it is not known for certain that the city ranked as second in size after London, although Norwich was recorded as having 130 individual trades at the end of the 13th century, in comparison with 175 for London, and more than any other regional centre in England.) During her lifetime, the Black Death reached Norwich; the disease may have killed over half the population of the city, and returned in subsequent outbreaks up to 1387. Julian was alive during the Peasants' Revolt of 1381, when the city was overwhelmed by rebel forces led by Geoffrey Litster. Henry le Despenser, the Bishop of Norwich, executed Litster after the peasant army was defeated at the Battle of North Walsham. Despenser zealously opposed the Lollards, who advocated reform of the Church, and some of them were burnt at the stake at Lollards Pit, just outside the city.

Norwich may have been one of the most religious cities in Europe at that time, with its cathedral, friaries, churches and recluses' cells dominating both the landscape and the lives of its citizens. On the eastern side of the city was the cathedral priory (founded in 1096), the Benedictine Hospital of St Paul, the Carmelite monastery, St Giles's Hospital, and the Franciscan friary, known as Greyfriars. To the south stood a Benedictine priory of nuns known as Carrow Abbey, which was located just beyond the city walls. Its income was mainly generated from "livings" acquired from the renting of its assets, which included the Norwich churches of St Julian, All Saints Timberhill, St Edward Conisford and St Catherine Newgate, all now lost apart from St Julian's. The churches with anchorite cells enhanced the reputation of the priory, as they attracted endowments from across society.

== Life ==
=== Sources for Julian's life ===
Little of Julian's life is known. The few scant comments she provided about herself are contained in her writings, later published in a book commonly known as Revelations of Divine Love, a title first used in 1670. The earliest surviving copy of a manuscript of Julian's, made by a scribe in the 1470s, acknowledges her as the author of the work.

The earliest known references to Julian come from four wills, in which she is described as being an anchoress. The wills were all made by individuals who lived in Norwich. Roger Reed, the rector of St Michael Coslany, Norwich, whose will of 20 March 1394 provides the earliest record of Julian's existence, made a bequest of 12 shillings to be paid to "Julian anakorite". Thomas Edmund, a Chantry priest from Aylsham, stipulated in his will of 19 May 1404 that 12 pennies be given to "Julian, anchoress of the church of St Julian, Conisford" and 8 pennies to "Sarah, living with her". (Note: It has been assumed by the historian Janina Ramirez that Sarah was Julian's maid, and her link to the outside world. According to Ramirez, she probably had access to Julian by means of a smaller adjoining room.) John Plumpton from Norwich gave 40 pennies to "the anchoress in the church of St Julian's, Conisford, and a shilling each to her maid and her former maid Alice" in his will dated 24 November 1415. The fourth person to mention Julian was Isabelle, Countess of Suffolk (the second wife of William de Ufford, 2nd Earl of Suffolk), who made a bequest of 20 shillings to "Julian reclus a Norwich" in her will dated 26 September 1416. As a bequest to an unnamed anchorite at St Julian's was made in 1429, there is a possibility Julian was alive at this time.

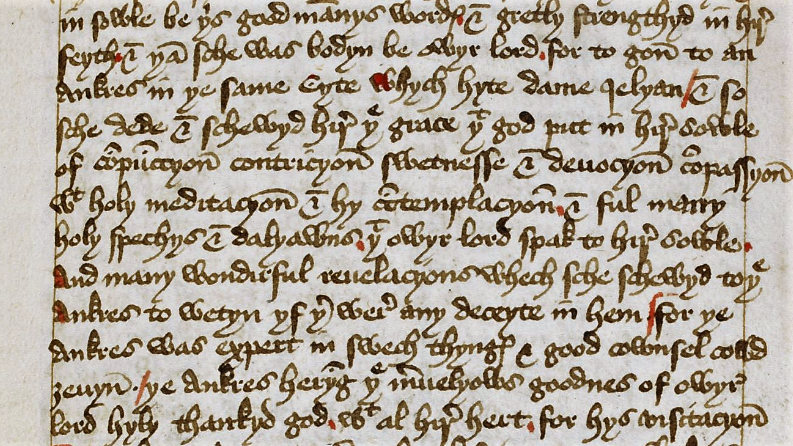
Part of the manuscript (c. 1440) dictated by the mystic Margery Kempe to a scribe, in which she mentions visiting "dame jelyan" (British Library)

Julian was known as a spiritual authority within her community, where she also served as an adviser. In around 1414, when she was in her seventies, she was visited by the English mystic Margery Kempe. The Book of Margery Kempe, which is possibly the first autobiography to be written in English, mentions that Kempe travelled to Norwich to obtain spiritual advice from Julian, saying she was "bidden by Our Lord" to go to "Dame Jelyan [...] for the anchoress was expert in" divine revelations, "and good counsel could give". Kempe never referred to Julian as an author, although she was familiar with the works of other spiritual writers, and mentioned them.

=== Visions ===
Julian wrote in Revelations of Divine Love that she became seriously ill at the age of 30. She could have been an anchoress when she fell ill, although it is possible she was a lay person living at home, as she was visited by her mother and other people, and the rules of enclosure for an anchoress would not normally have allowed outsiders such access. On 8 May 1373 a curate administered the last rites of the church to her, in anticipation of her death. As he held a crucifix above the foot of her bed, she began to lose her sight and feel physically numb, but gazing on the crucifix she saw the figure of Jesus begin to bleed. Over the next several hours, she had a series of 15 visions of Jesus, and a 16th the following night.

Julian completely recovered from her illness on 13 May; there is general agreement that she wrote about her "shewings" shortly after she experienced them. Her original manuscript no longer exists, but a copy, now known as the Short Text, survived. Decades later, perhaps in the early 1390s, she began a theological exploration of the meaning of her visions, and produced writings now known as The Long Text. This second work seems to have gone through many revisions before it was finished, perhaps in the 1410s or 1420s. Julian's revelations seem to be the first important example of a vision by an Englishwoman for 200 years, in contrast with the Continent, where "a golden age of women's mysticism" occurred during the 13th and 14th centuries.

=== Personal life ===
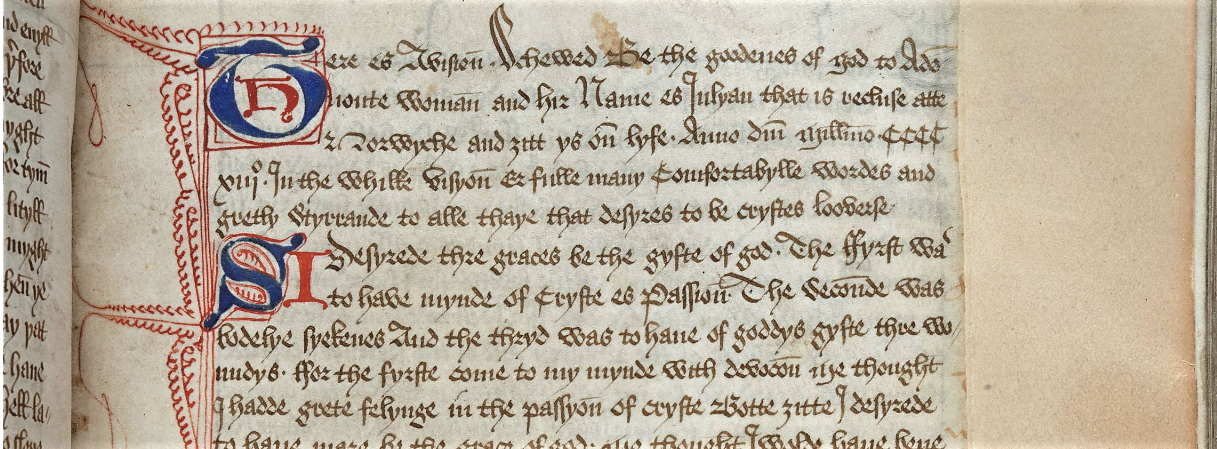
The beginning of the 15th-century Short Text. "Here es a vision schewed be the goodenes of god to a devoute woman and hir name es Julyan that is recluse atte Norwyche and ȝitt ys on lyfe anno domini millesimo ccccxiii". (BL, Add MS 37790)

The few autobiographical details Julian included in the Short Text, including her gender, were suppressed when she wrote her longer text later in life. Historians are not even sure of her actual name. It is generally thought to be taken from the church in Norwich to which her cell was attached, but Julian was also used in its own right as a girl's name in the Middle Ages, and so could have been her Christian name.

Julian's writings indicate that she was born in 1343 or late 1342, and died after 1416. She was six when the Black Death arrived in Norwich. It has been speculated that she was educated as a young girl by the Benedictine nuns of Carrow Abbey, as a school for girls existed there during her childhood. There is no written evidence that she was ever a nun at Carrow.

According to several commentators, including Santha Bhattacharji in the Oxford Dictionary of National Biography, Julian's discussion of the maternal nature of God suggests that she knew of motherhood from her own experience of bringing up children. As plague epidemics were rampant during the 14th century, it has been suggested that Julian may have lost her own family as a result. By becoming an anchoress she would have been kept in quarantine away from the rest of the population of Norwich. However, nothing in Julian's writings provides any indication of the plagues, religious conflict, or civil insurrection that occurred in the city during her lifetime. Kenneth Leech and Sister Benedicta Ward, the joint authors of Julian Reconsidered (1988), concluded that she was a young widowed mother and never a nun. They based their opinion on a dearth of references about her occupation in life and a lack of evidence to connect her with Carrow Abbey, which would have honoured her and buried her in the grounds had she been strongly connected with the priory.

=== Life as an anchoress ===
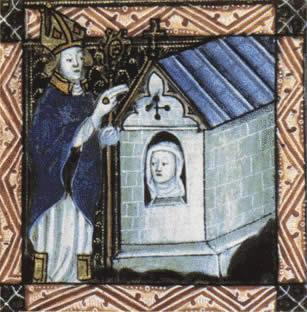
A bishop blessing an anchoress, from MS 079: Pontifical (c. 1400 – c. 1410), Corpus Christi College, Cambridge

Julian was an anchoress from at least the 1390s. Living in her cell, she would have played an important part within her community, devoting herself to a life of prayer to complement the clergy in their primary function as protectors of souls. Her solitary life would have begun after the completion of an onerous selection process. An important church ceremony would have taken place at St Julian's Church, in the presence of the bishop. During the ceremony, psalms from the Office of the Dead would have been sung for Julian (as if it were her funeral), and at some point she would have been led to her cell door and into the room beyond. The door would afterwards have been sealed up, and she would have remained in her cell for the rest of her life.

Once her life of seclusion had begun, Julian would have had to follow the strict rules laid down for anchoresses. Two important sources of information about the life of such women have survived. De institutione inclusarum was written in Latin by Ælred of Rieveaulx in around 1162, and the Ancrene Riwle was written in Middle English in around 1200. (Note: Apart from The Ancrene Riwle and De institutione inclusarum, the most important of the 13 surviving texts are Richard Rolle's Form of Living (c. 1348) and The Scale of Perfection (written by Walter Hilton in 1386 and later, prior to his death in 1396).) Originally made for three sisters, the Ancrene Riwle became in time a manual for all female recluses. The work regained its former popularity during the mystical movement of the 14th century. It may have been available to Julian to read and become familiar with—being a book written in a language she could read. The book stipulated that anchoresses should live in confined isolation, in poverty, and under a vow of chastity. The popular image of Julian living with her cat for company stems from the regulations set out in the Ancrene Riwle.

As an anchoress living in the heart of an urban environment, Julian would not have been entirely secluded. She would have enjoyed the financial support of the more prosperous members of the local community, as well as the general affection of the population. She would have in turn provided prayers and given advice to visitors, serving as an example of devout holiness. According to one edition of the Cambridge Medieval History, it is possible that she met the English mystic Walter Hilton, who died when Julian was in her fifties, and who may have influenced her writings in a small way.

== Revelations of Divine Love ==
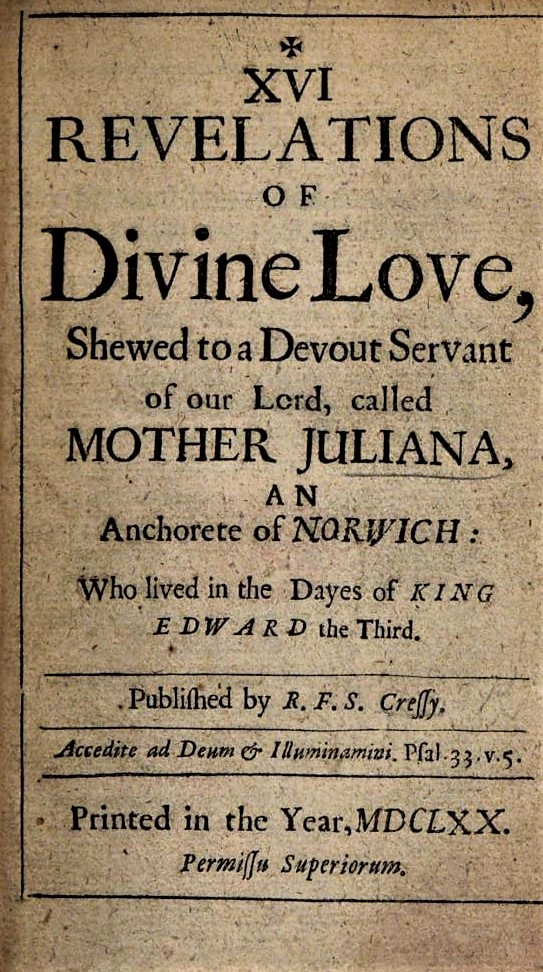
First edition of XVI Revelations of Divine Love (1670)

Both the Long Text and Short Text of Julian's Revelations of Divine Love contain an account of each of her revelations. Her writings are unique, as they are the earliest surviving English language works by a woman, although it is possible that some anonymous works may have had female authors. They are also the only surviving writings by an English anchoress. The Long Text consists of 86 chapters and about 63,500 words, and is about six times longer than the Short Text.

In 14th century England, when women were generally barred from high status positions, their knowledge of Latin would have been limited, and it is more likely that they read and wrote in English. The historian Janina Ramirez has suggested that by choosing to write in her vernacular language, a precedent set by other medieval writers, Julian was "attempting to express the inexpressible" in the best way possible. Nothing written by Julian was ever mentioned in any bequests, nor written for a specific readership, or influenced other medieval authors, and almost no references were made to her writings from the time they were written until the beginning of the 20th century.

Julian's writings were largely unknown until 1670, when they were published under the title XVI Revelations of Divine Love, shewed to a devout servant of Our Lord, called Mother Juliana, an Anchorete of Norwich: Who lived in the Dayes of King Edward the Third by Serenus de Cressy, a confessor for the English nuns at Cambrai. Cressy based his book on the Long Text, probably written by Julian in the 1410s or 1420s. Three manuscript copies of the Long Text have survived. One copy of the complete Long Text, known as the Paris Manuscript, resides in the Bibliothèque nationale de France in Paris, and two other manuscripts are now in the British Library in London. One of the manuscripts was perhaps copied out by Dame Clementina Cary, who founded the English Benedictine monastery in Paris. Cressy's edition was reprinted in 1843 and 1864, and again in 1902.

A new version of the book was produced by Henry Collins in 1877. It became still better known after the publication of Grace Warrack's 1901 edition, which included modernised language, as well as, according to the author Georgia Ronan Crampton, a "sympathetic informed introduction". The book introduced most early 20th century readers to Julian's writings; according to the historian Henrietta Leyser, Julian was "beloved in the 20th century by theologians and poets alike".

Julian's shorter work, now known as the Short Text, was probably written not long after her visions in May 1373. As with the Long Text, the original manuscript was lost, but not before at least one copy was made by a scribe. It was in the possession of an English Catholic family at one point. The copy was seen and described by the antiquarian Francis Blomefield in 1745. After disappearing from view for 150 years, it was found in 1910, in a collection of contemplative medieval texts bought by the British Museum, and was published by the Reverend Dundas Harford in 1911. Now part of British Library Add MS 37790, the manuscript—with Julian's Short Text of 33 pages (folios 97r to 115r)—is held in the British Library.

== Theology ==
From the time these things were first revealed I had often wanted to know what was our Lord's meaning. It was more than fifteen years after that I was answered in my spirit's understanding. "You would know our Lord's meaning in this thing? Know it well. Love was His meaning. Who showed it to you? Love. What did He show you? Love. Why did He show it? For love. Hold on to this and you will know and understand love more and more. But you will not know or learn anything else – ever."

— Julian of Norwich, Revelations of Divine Love

Julian of Norwich is now recognised as one of England's most important mystics; according to Leyser, she was the greatest English anchoress. For the theologian Denys Turner the core issue Julian addresses in Revelations of Divine Love is "the problem of sin". Julian says that sin is behovely, which is often translated as "necessary", "appropriate", or "fitting".

Julian lived in a time of turmoil, but her theology was optimistic and spoke of God's omnibenevolence and love in terms of joy and compassion. Revelations of Divine Love "contains a message of optimism based on the certainty of being loved by God and of being protected by his Providence".

A characteristic element of Julian's mystical theology was her equating divine love with motherly love, a theme found in the Biblical prophets, as in Isaiah 49:15. According to Julian, God is both our mother and our father. As the medievalist Caroline Walker Bynum shows, this idea was also developed by Bernard of Clairvaux and others from the 12th century onward. Bynum regards the medieval notion of Jesus as a mother as being a metaphor rather than a literal belief. In her fourteenth revelation, Julian writes of the Trinity in domestic terms, comparing Jesus to a mother who is wise, loving and merciful. Author Frances Beer asserted that Julian believed that the maternal aspect of Christ was literal and not metaphoric: Christ is not like a mother, he is literally the mother. Julian emphasised this by explaining how the bond between mother and child is the only earthly relationship that comes close to the relationship a person can have with Jesus. She used metaphors when writing about Jesus in relation to ideas about conceiving, giving birth, weaning and upbringing.

Julian wrote, "For I saw no wrath except on man's side, and He forgives that in us, for wrath is nothing else but a perversity and an opposition to peace and to love." She wrote that God sees us as perfect and waits for the day when human souls mature so that evil and sin will no longer hinder us, and that "God is nearer to us than our own soul". This theme is repeated throughout her work: "Jesus answered with these words, saying: 'All shall be well, and all shall be well, and all manner of thing shall be well.' ... This was said so tenderly, without blame of any kind toward me or anybody else."

Her status as an anchoress may have prevented contemporary monastic and university authorities from challenging her theology. A lack of references to her work during her own time may indicate that she kept her writings with her in her cell, so that religious authorities were unaware of them. The 14th-century English cardinal Adam Easton's Defensorium sanctae birgittae, Alfonso of Jaen's Epistola Solitarii, and the English mystic William Flete's Remedies against Temptations, are all referenced in Julian's text.

== Commemoration ==
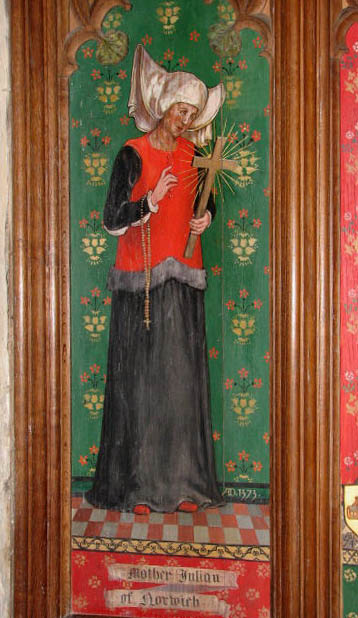
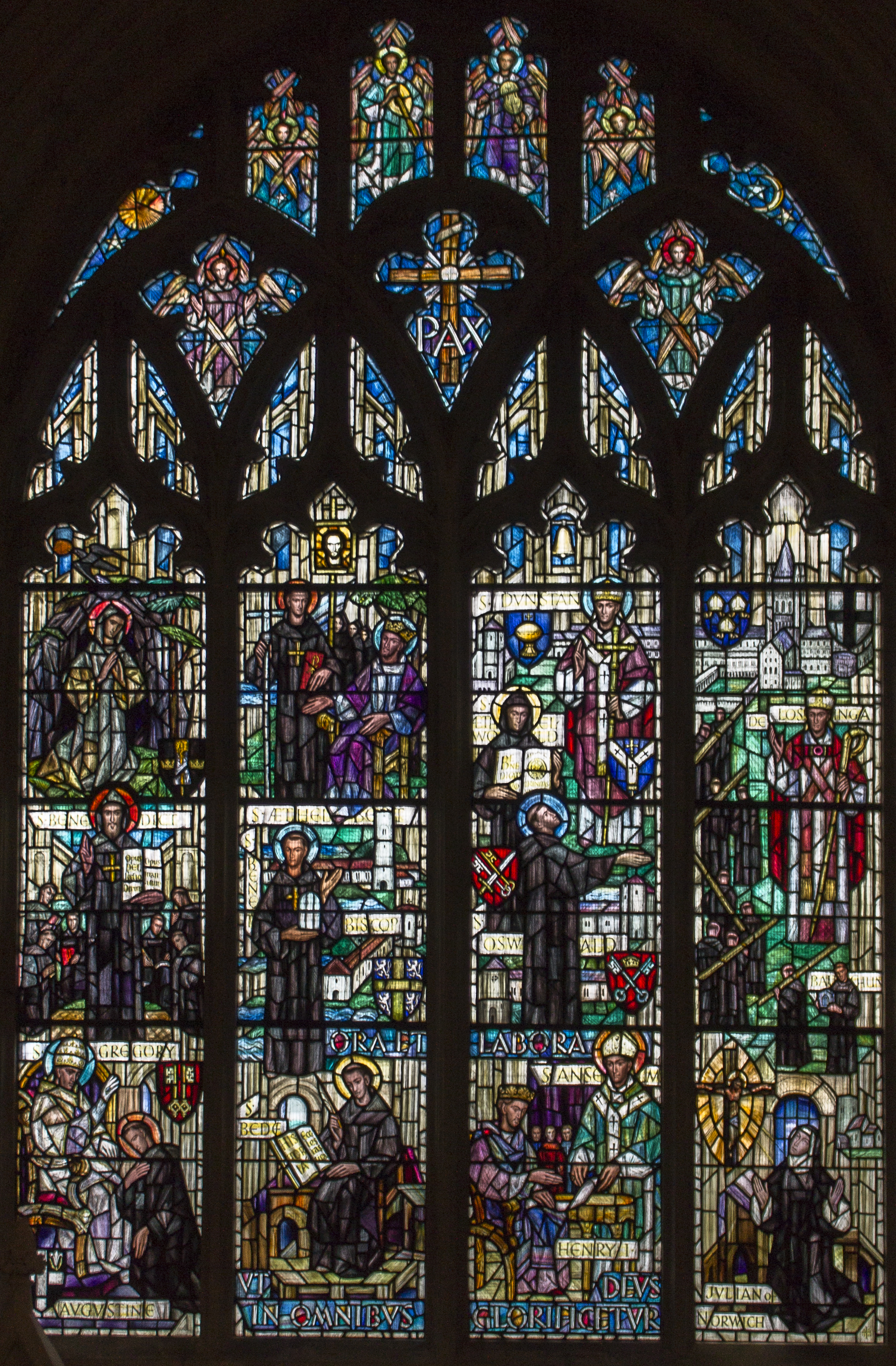
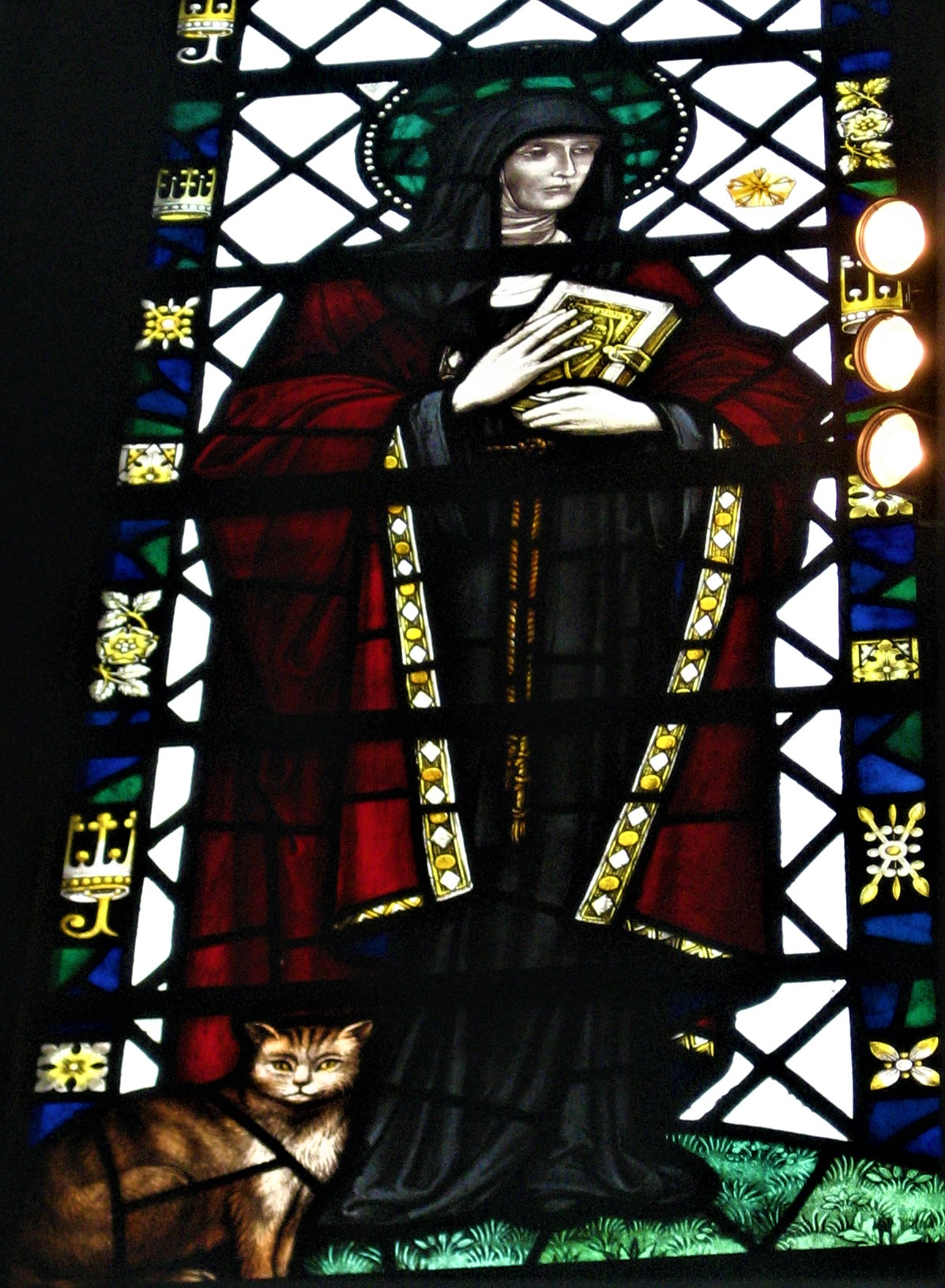
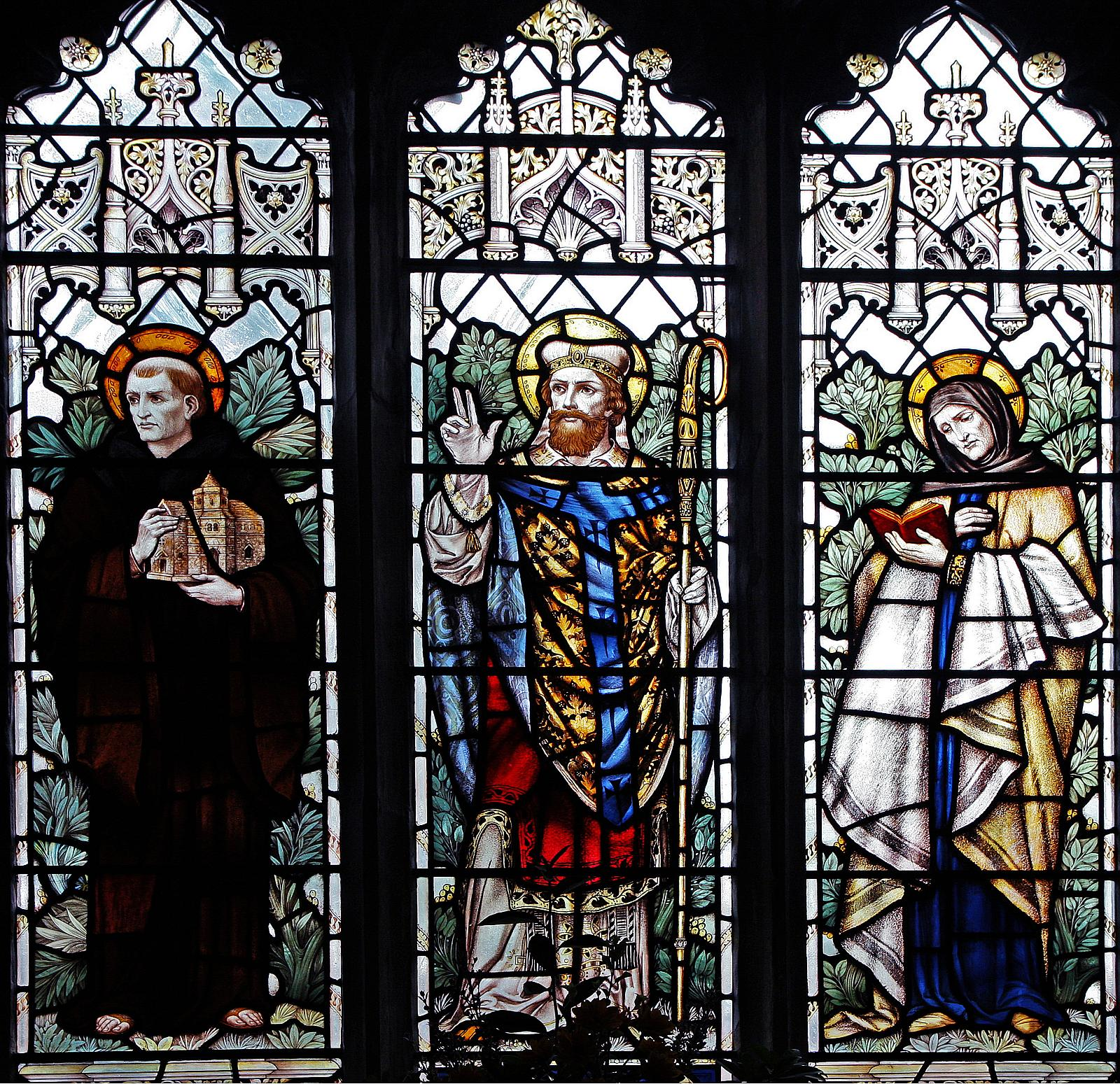
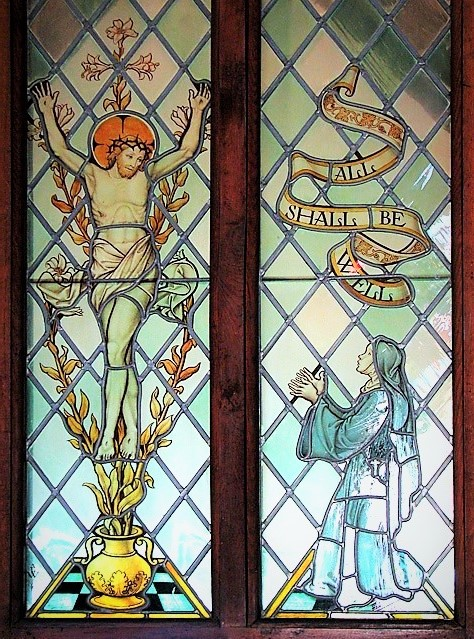
Depictions of Julian of Norwich (clockwise, from top left): the rood screen at St Andrew and St Mary Church, Langham, Norfolk; as part of the Bauchon Window, Norwich Cathedral; Norwich Cathedral; St Julian's Church, Norwich; Church of St Andrew the Apostle, Holt, Norfolk.

Julian is remembered in the Church of England with a Lesser Festival on 8 May. The Episcopal Church and the Evangelical Lutheran Church in the United States also commemorate her on 8 May.

Although not canonised in the Catholic Church (as of 2026) or listed in the Roman Martyrology, Julian is quoted in the Catechism of the Catholic Church. In 1997, Father Giandomenico Mucci listed Julian among 18 individuals who are considered potential Doctors of the Church, describing her as a beata.

Pope Benedict XVI discussed the life and teaching of Julian at a General Audience on 1 December 2010, stating: "Julian of Norwich understood the central message for spiritual life: God is love and it is only if one opens oneself to this love, totally and with total trust, and lets it become one's sole guide in life, that all things are transfigured, true peace and true joy found and one is able to radiate it." He concluded: "'And all will be well,' 'all manner of things shall be well': this is the final message that Julian of Norwich transmits to us and that I am also proposing to you today." Pope Francis also mentions her in his encyclical letter Dilexit nos as one of a number of "holy women" who have "spoken of resting in the heart of the Lord as the source of life and interior peace".

== Legacy ==
The 20th- and 21st-century revival of interest in Julian has been associated with a renewed interest in Christian contemplation in the English-speaking world. The Julian Meetings, an association of contemplative prayer groups, takes its name from her, but is unaffiliated to any faith doctrine, and is unconnected with Julian's theology, although her writings are sometimes used in meetings.

=== St Julian's Church ===
There were no hermits or anchorites in Norwich from 1312 until the emergence of Julian in the 1370s. St Julian's Church, located off King Street in the south of Norwich city centre, holds regular services. The building, which has a round tower, is one of the 31 parish churches from a total of 58 that once existed in Norwich during the Middle Ages, of which 36 had an anchorite cell.

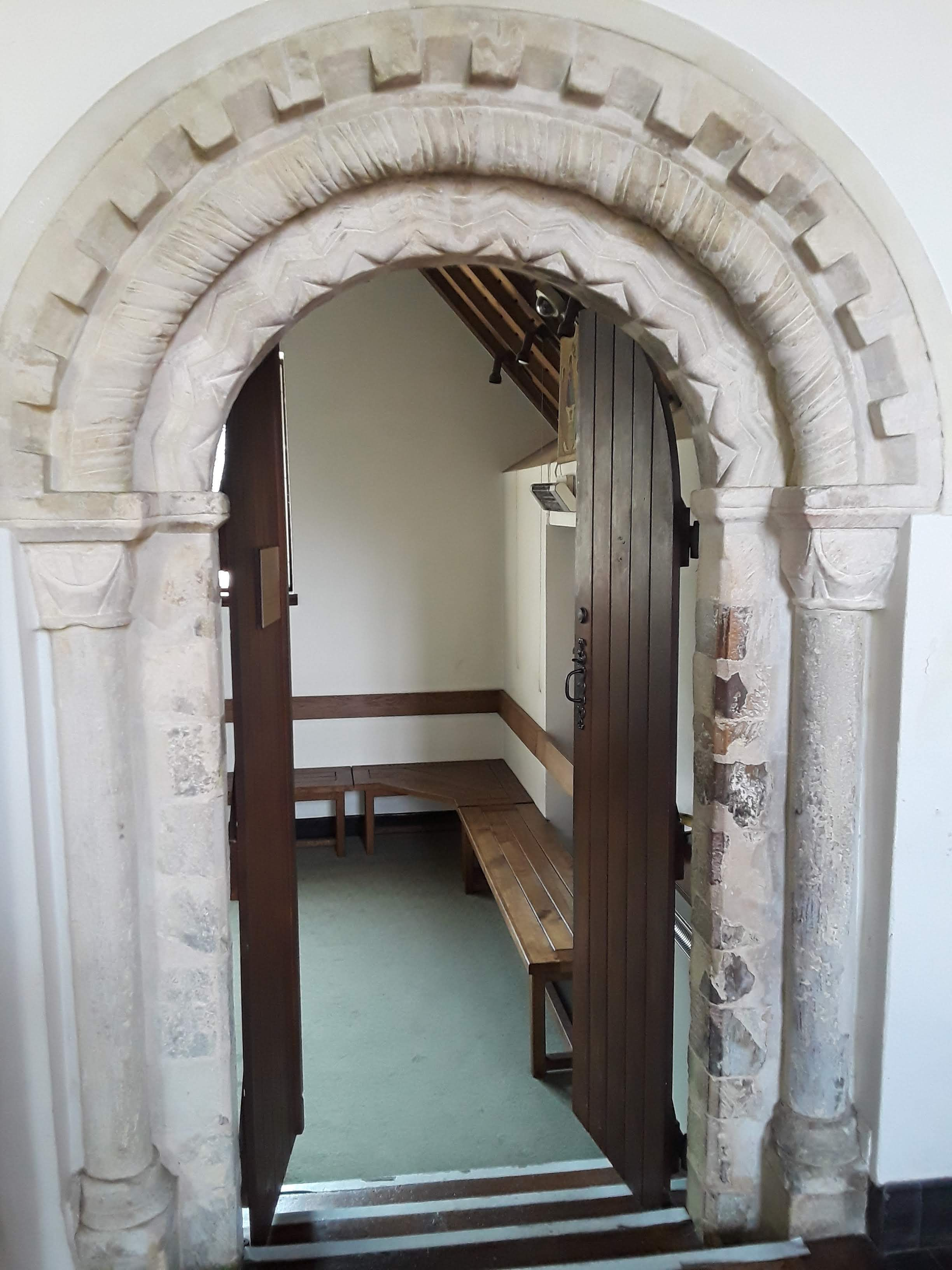
Romanesque entrance to the modern cell

The cell did not remain empty after Julian's death. In 1428 Julian(a) Lampett (or Lampit) moved in when Edith Wilton was the prioress responsible for the church, and remained in the cell until 1478 when Margaret Pygot was prioress. The cell continued to be used by anchorites until the Dissolution of the Monasteries in the 1530s, when it was demolished and the church stripped of its rood screen and statues. No rector was appointed from then until 1581.

By 1845 St Julian's was in a poor state of repair and the east wall collapsed that year. After an appeal for funds, the church was restored. (Note: According to the author Sheila Upjohn and the church historian Nicholas Groves, "The restoration of the church, when [the rector] was finally forced to take action after half a century of neglect, was ruthless to the point of vandalism.") The church underwent further restoration during the first half of the 20th century, but was destroyed during the Norwich Blitz of June 1942 when the tower received a direct hit. After the war, the church was rebuilt. It now appears largely as it was before its destruction, although its tower is much reduced in height and a chapel has been built in place of the long-lost anchorite cell.

=== Literature ===
The Catechism of the Catholic Church quotes from Revelations of Divine Love in its explanation of how God can draw a greater good, even from evil. The poet T. S. Eliot incorporated "All shall be well, and all shall be well, and all manner of thing shall be well" three times into his poem "Little Gidding", the fourth of his Four Quartets (1943), as well as Julian's "the ground of our beseeching". The poem renewed the English-speaking public's awareness of Julian's texts. (Note: The medievalist Barbara Newman notes that Julian's saying within Little Gidding serves "as a refrain, much as it does in Julian's own Revelations of Love", and that it was included at a late stage in the poem's development, after it had been worked on by Eliot for more than a year.)

And all shall be well and
All manner of thing shall be well
When the tongues of flames are in-folded
Into the crowned knot of fire
And the fire and the rose are one.

— T. S. Eliot, Little Gidding, Four Quartets

Sydney Carter's song "All Shall Be Well" (sometimes called "The Bells of Norwich"), which uses words by Julian, was published in 1982. Julian's writings have been translated into numerous languages.

In 2023 Julian was the subject of the fictional autobiography I, Julian by Dr Claire Gilbert, Visiting Fellow at Jesus College, Cambridge. Gilbert discussed her book on BBC Radio 4's Woman's Hour on 8 May 2023.

=== Norfolk and Norwich ===
In 2013 the University of East Anglia honoured Julian by naming its new study centre the Julian Study Centre. Norwich's first Julian Week was held in May 2013. The celebration included concerts, talks, and free events held throughout the city, with the stated aim of encouraging people "to learn about Julian and her artistic, historical and theological significance".

The Lady Julian Bridge, crossing the River Wensum and linking King Street and the Riverside Walk close to Norwich railway station, was named in honour of the anchoress. An example of a swing bridge, built to allow larger vessels to approach a basin further upstream, it was designed by the Mott MacDonald Group and completed in 2009. During 2023, the Friends of Julian of Norwich organized a series of events, centred around 8 May, the 650th anniversary of the occurrence of Julian's revelations.

== Works: Revelations of Divine Love ==
=== Manuscripts ===
==== Long Text ====
- Julian of Norwich. "MS Fonds Anglais 40 (previously Regius 8297): Liber Revelacionum Julyane, anachorite norwyche, divisé en quatre-vingt-six chapitres". Anglais 40. Bibliothèque nationale de France.
- Julian of Norwich. "Sloane MS 2499: Juliana, Mother, Anchorite of Norwich: Revelations to, of Divine Love, 1373". Sloane Manuscripts. British Library.
- Julian of Norwich. "Sloane MS 3705: Visions: Revelations to Mother Juliana in the year 1373 of the love of God in Jesus Christ". Sloane Manuscripts. British Library.
- Westminster Cathedral Treasury MS 4 (W), a late 15th or early 16th century manuscript. It includes extracts from Julian's Long Text, as well as selections from the writings of the English mystic Walter Hilton. The manuscript is on loan to Westminster Abbey's Muniments Room and Library (as of 1997).

==== Short Text ====
- "Add MS 37790: A Carthusian anthology of theological works in English (the 'Amherst Manuscript')". Belonged to William Amhurst Tyssen-Amherst, Baron Amherst of Hackney. British Library. Retrieved 12 October 2021.

=== Selected editions ===
- Collins, Henry, ed. (1877). Revelations of Divine Love, Shewed to a Devout Anchoress, by name Mother Julian of Norwich. Mediaeval library of mystical and ascetical works. London: T. Richardson.
- Cressy, Serenus de. "XVI Revelations of Divine Love, Shewed to a Devout Servant of Our Lord, called Mother Juliana, an Anchorete of Norwich: Who lived in the Dayes of King Edward the Third" (1670). British Library General Reference Collection, ID: Digital Store Cup.403.a.36. London: British Library.
- Warrack, Grace, ed. (1901). Revelations of Divine Love, Recorded by Julian, Anchoress at Norwich, 1373 (1st ed.). London: Methuen and Company. OCLC 560165491. (The second edition (1907) is available online from the Internet Archive.)
- Hudleston, Roger, ed. (1927). Revelations of divine love shewed to a devout ankress, by name Julian of Norwich. Orchard books. Vol. XI (1st ed.). London: Burns, Oates and Washbourne. OCLC 5167762.
- Skinner, John, ed. (1997). Revelation of Love. New York: Doubleday. ISBN 978-0-385-48756-6.
- Beer, Frances, ed. (1998). Revelations of Divine Love, translated from British Library Additional MS 37790: the Motherhood of God : an excerpt, translated from British Library MS Sloane 2477. Rochester, New York: D.S. Brewer. ISBN 978-0-85991-453-6.
- Reynolds, Anna Maria & Julia Bolton Holloway, eds. (2001). Showing of Love: Extant Texts and Translations. Florence: Società Internazionale per lo Studio del Medioevo Latino (SISMEL). ISBN 978-88-8450-095-3.
- Starr, Mirabai (2013). The Showings of Julian of Norwich: A New Translation. Charlottesville, Virginia: Hampton Roads Publishing Company. ISBN 978-1-57174-691-7.
- Windeatt, Barry, ed. (2015). Revelations of Divine Love. Oxford: Oxford University Press. ISBN 978-0-19-811206-8.

== See also ==
- Order of Julian of Norwich
- Visions of Jesus and Mary

== Sources ==
- Baker, Denise N. (September 1993). "Julian of Norwich and Anchoritic Literature". Mystics Quarterly. 19 (4). University Park: Penn State University Press: 148–161. JSTOR 20717181.
- Beer, Frances (1992). Women and Mystical Experience in the Middle Ages. Woodbridge: Boydell Press. ISBN 978-0-85115-302-5.
- Blomefield, Francis & Parkin, Charles (1805) [First published 1739–1775]. An Essay towards a Topographical History of the County of Norfolk. Vol. 4. London: Printed for W. Miller. OCLC 560883605.
- Butler-Bowden, William & Chambers, Raymond Wilson (1954). The Book Of Margery Kempe. London; Toronto: Oxford University Press. OCLC 3633095.
- Bynum, Caroline Walker (1984). Jesus as Mother: Studies in the Spirituality of the High Middle Ages. Berkeley: University of California Press. ISBN 978-0-520-05222-2.
- Crampton, Georgia Ronan, ed. (1994). The Shewings of Julian of Norwich. Kalamazoo: Western Michigan University. ISBN 978-1-879288-45-4.
- Cré, Marleen (2011). "London, Westminster Cathedral Treasury, MS 4: An Edition of the Westminster Compilation". Journal of Medieval Religious Cultures. 37 (1). University Park: Penn State University Press: 1–59. doi:10.5325/jmedirelicult.37.1.0001. ISSN 1947-6566. JSTOR 10.5325. Archived from the original on 16 November 2021.
- D-Vasilescu, Elena Ene (2018). Heavenly Sustenance in Patristic Texts and Byzantine Iconography: Nourished by the Word. New York: Palgrave Macmillan. ISBN 978-3-319-98985-3.
- Eliot, Thomas Stearns (1944). Four Quartets. London: Faber and Faber. OCLC 799627762. (1995 Faber and Faber edition ISBN 978-0-571-17652-6.)
- Fugelso, Karl, ed. (2020). Studies in Medievalism XXIX. Woodbridge, Suffolk: Boydell & Brewer Ltd. ISBN 978-1-84384-556-0.
- Groves, Nicholas (2010). The Medieval Churches of the City of Norwich. Norwich: Norwich Heritage Economic and Regeneration Trust (HEART) and East Publishing. ISBN 978-0-9560385-2-4.
- Holloway, Julia Bolton (2016). Julian Among the Books: Julian of Norwich's Theological Library. Newcastle-upon-Tyne: Cambridge Scholars Publishing. ISBN 978-1-4438-8894-3.
- Jantzen, Grace Marion (2011). Julian of Norwich: Mystic and Theologian. London: Society for Promoting Christian Knowledge. ISBN 978-0-281-06424-3.
- Kempster, Hugh (December 1997). "Julian of Norwich: The Westminster Text of a Revelation of Love". Mystics Quarterly. 23 (4). University Park: Penn State University Press: 177–246. JSTOR 20717317.
- Leech, Kenneth & Ward, Sister Benedicta (1995). Julian Reconsidered. Oxford: SLG Press. ISBN 978-0-7283-0122-1.
- Leyser, Henrietta (2002). Medieval Women: a Social History of Women in England 450–1500. London: Phoenix Press. ISBN 978-1-84212-621-9.
- McGinn, Bernard (2012). The Varieties of Vernacular Mysticism 1350–1550. New York: Herder & Herder. ISBN 978-0-8245-4392-1.
- Newman, Barbara (2011). "Eliot's Affirmative Way: Julian of Norwich, Charles Williams, and Little Gidding". Modern Philology. 108 (3). Chicago: University of Chicago Press: 427–461. doi:10.1086/658355. ISSN 0026-8232. JSTOR 10.1086/658355. S2CID 162999145.
- Obbard, Elizabeth Ruth (2008). Through Julian's Windows: Growing into wholeness with Julian of Norwich. Norwich: Canterbury Press. ISBN 978-1-85311-903-3.
- Pelphrey, Brant (1989). Christ our Mother: Julian of Norwich. Wilmington, Delaware: Glazier. ISBN 978-0-89453-623-6.
- Ramirez, Janina (2016). Julian of Norwich: A very brief history. London: Society for Promoting Christian Knowledge. ISBN 978-0-281-07737-3.
- Rawcliffe, Carol & Wilson, Richard, eds. (2004). Medieval Norwich. London & New York: Hambleton and London. ISBN 978-1-85285-449-2.
- Rolf, Veronica Mary (2013). Julian's Gospel: Illuminating the Life & Revelations of Julian of Norwich. Maryknoll, New York: Orbis Books. ISBN 978-1-62698-036-5.
- Rolf, Veronica Mary (2018). An Explorer's Guide to Julian of Norwich. Downers Grove, Illinois: InterVarsity Press. ISBN 978-0-8308-5088-4.
- Tanner, Joseph Robson; Previté-Orton, Charles William & Brooke, Zachary Nugent, eds. (1932). Cambridge Medieval History. Vol. 7. Cambridge: Cambridge University Press. OCLC 1067991653.
- Turner, Denys Alan (2011). Julian of Norwich, Theologian. New Haven, Connecticut: Yale University Press. ISBN 978-0-300-16391-9.
- Upjohn, Sheila & Groves, Nicholas (2018). St Julian's Church Norwich. Norwich: The Friends of Julian of Norwich. ISBN 978-0-9541524-6-8.
- Watson, Nicholas & Jenkins, Jacqueline (2006). The Writings of Julian of Norwich: A Vision Showed to a Devout Woman and A Revelation of Love. University Park: Penn State University Press. ISBN 978-0-271-02908-5.
