= Revelations of Divine Love =

Medieval book of Christian mystical devotions by Julian of Norwich

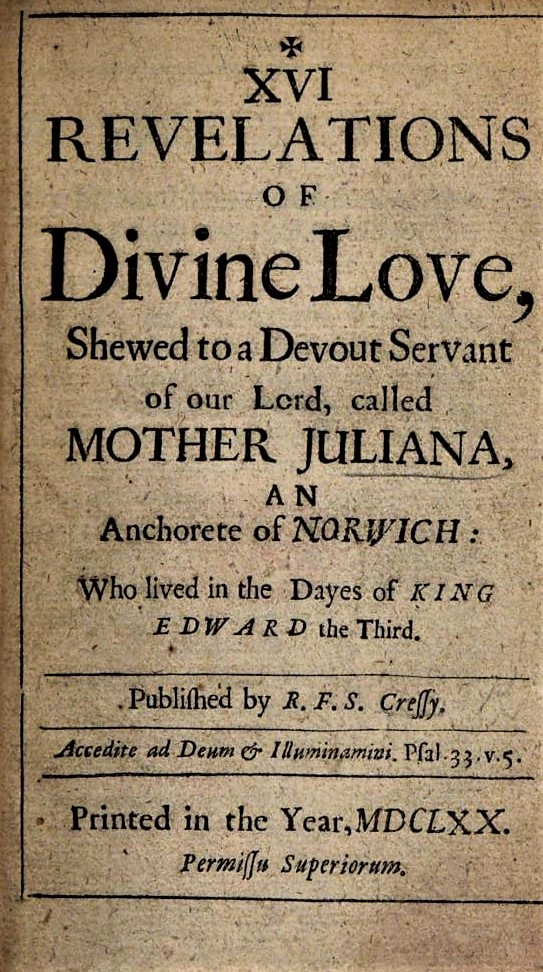
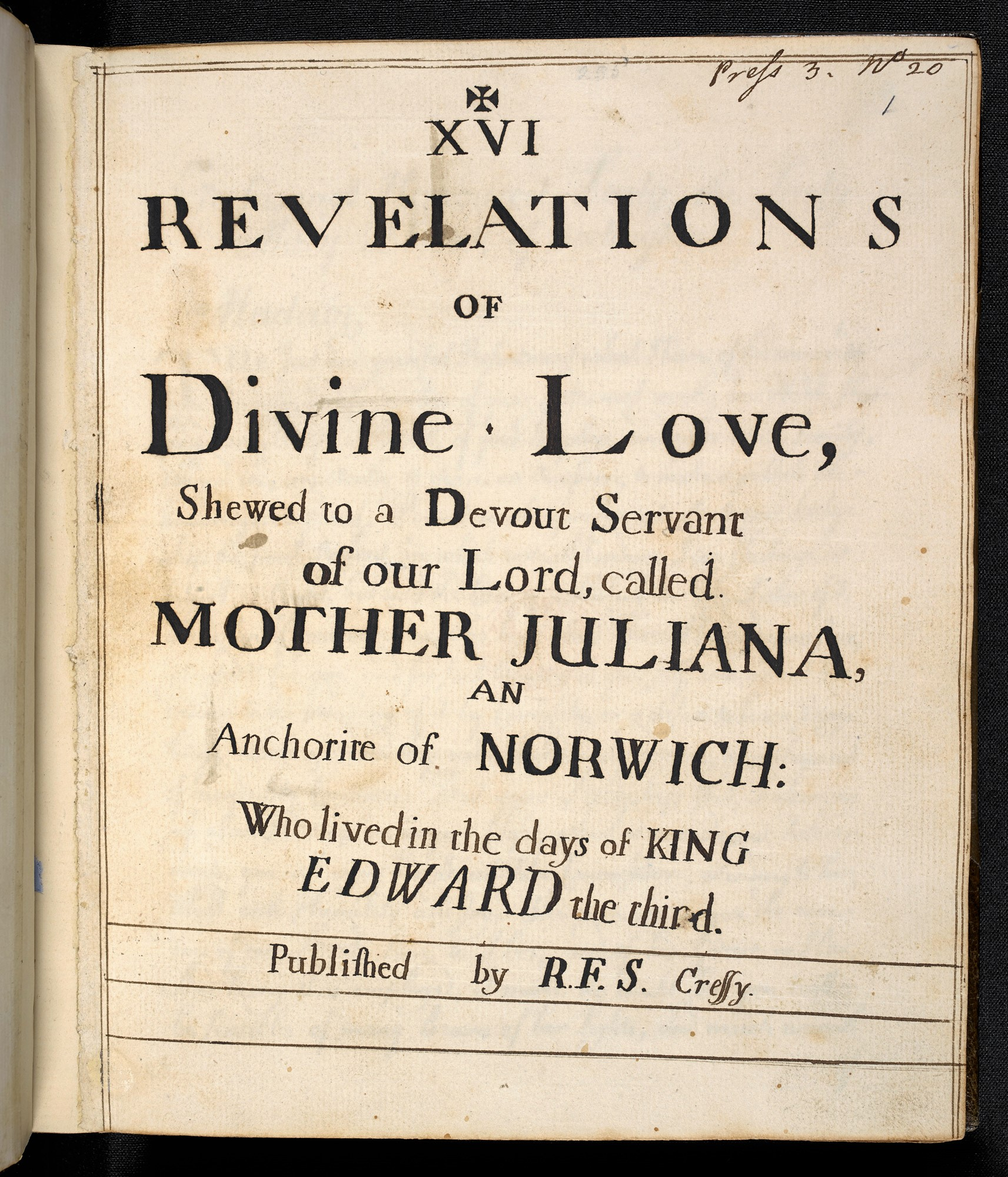
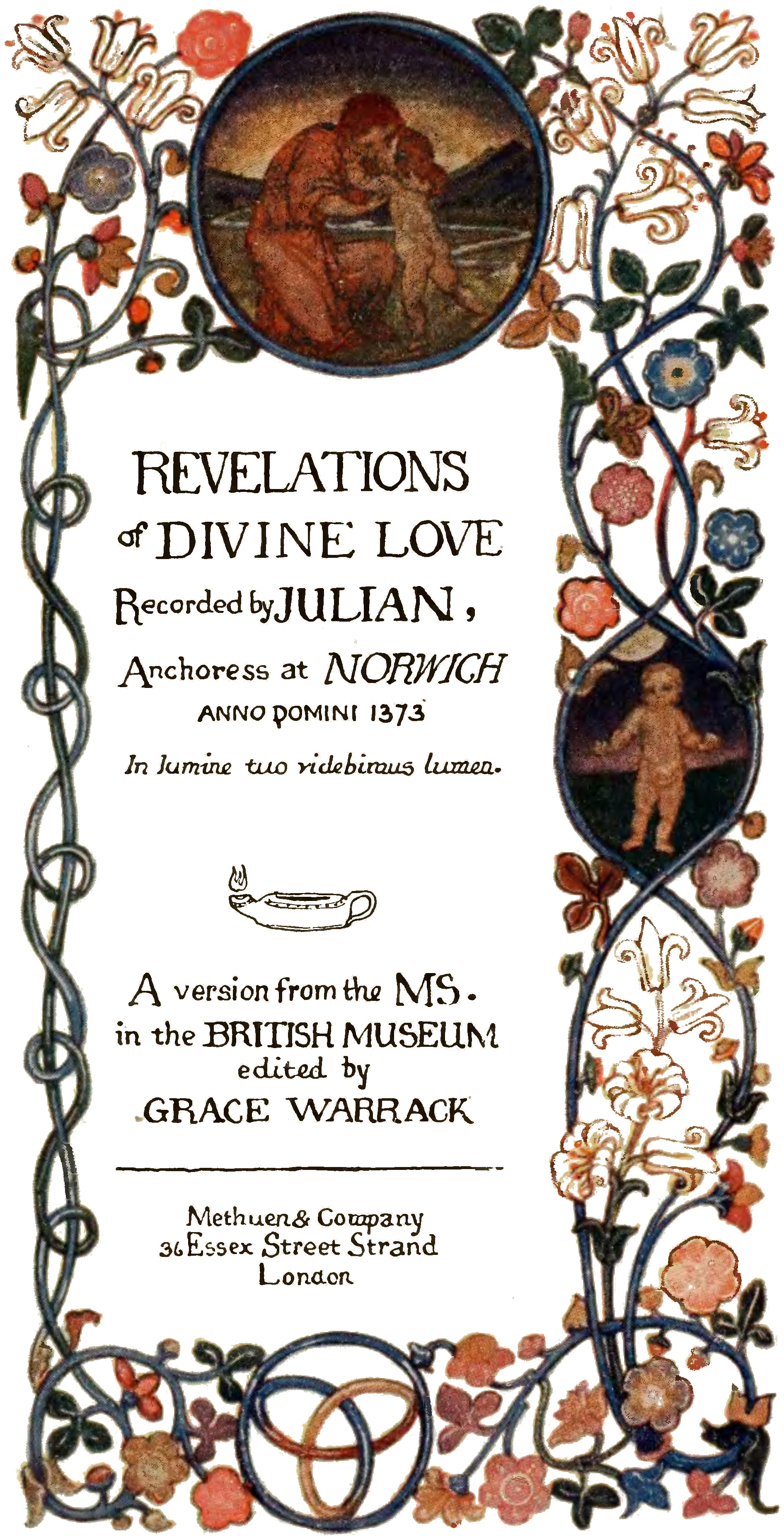
- The title pages of three historic versions of Revelations of Divine Love (from left to right): Serenus de Cressy's 1670 edition of the Long Text; the Long Text, written by an unknown hand in c. 1675, and copied from the manuscript used for the Serenus de Cressy edition of the book (Manuscript Stowe 42); the edition of the book by Grace Warrack (1901)
- Author: Julian of Norwich
- Original title: Revelations of Divine Love
- Translator: Serenus de Cressy; Grace Warrack; Dom Roger Hudleston
- Language: Middle English
- Genre: Christian mysticism
- Published: c. 1390s–1410s
- Publication place: Possibly England
- English publication date: 1670 (translated into Early Modern English)
- Media type: Manuscript
- Dewey Decimal: 242
- LC Class: BV4831 .J8
- Text: Revelations of Divine Love at Wikisource

Revelations of Divine Love is a medieval book of Christian mystical devotions. Containing 87 chapters, the work was written between the 14th and 15th centuries by Julian of Norwich, about whom almost nothing is known. It is the earliest surviving example of a book in the English language known to have been written by a woman. It is also the earliest surviving work written by an English anchorite or anchoress.

Julian, who lived all her life in the English city of Norwich, wrote about the sixteen mystical visions or "shewings" she received in 1373, when she was in her thirties. Whilst she was seriously ill, and believed to be on her deathbed, the visions appeared to her for several hours in one night, with a final revelation occurring the following night. After making a full recovery, she wrote an account of each vision, producing a manuscript now referred to as the Short Text. She developed her ideas for decades, whilst living as an anchoress in a cell attached to St Julian's Church, Norwich, and wrote a far more extended version of her writings, now known as the Long Text. She wrote in Middle English.

Julian's work was preserved by others. Various manuscripts of both the Long Text and the Short Text, in addition to extracts, have survived. The first publication of the book was a translation of the Long Text in 1670 by the English Benedictine monk Serenus de Cressy. Interest in Julian's writings increased with the publication of three versions of Cressy's book in the 19th century, and in 1901, Grace Warrack's translation of the manuscript of the Long Text known as 'Sloane 2499' introduced the book to 20th-century readers. Many other versions of Julian's book have since been published, in English and other languages.

== Julian of Norwich ==
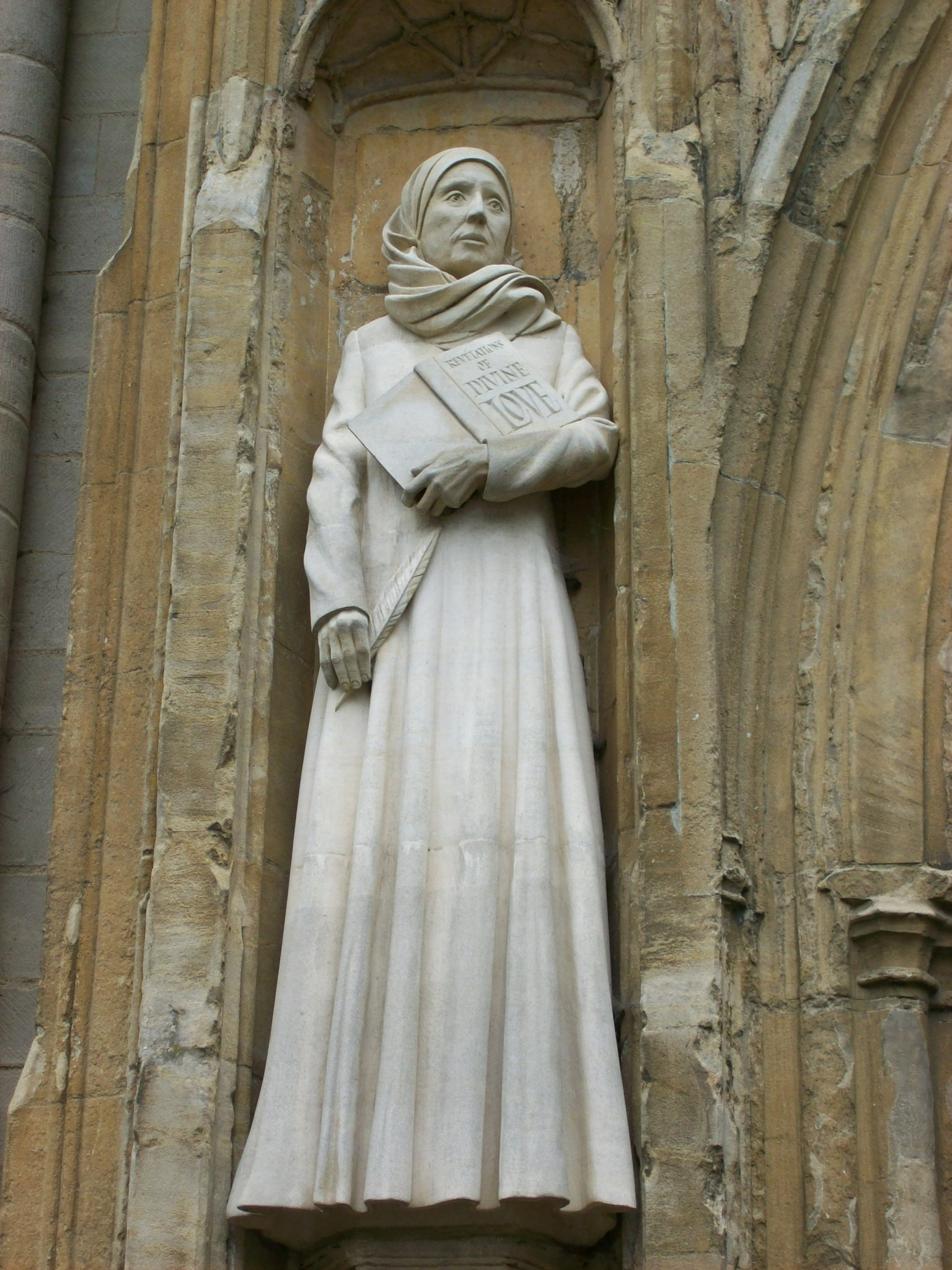
David Holgate's modern statue of Julian of Norwich, depicted holding a copy of Revelations of Divine Love. It was added to the west front of Norwich Cathedral in 2000.

Revelations of Divine Love was written by Julian of Norwich (1343–after 1416), an English anchoress and mystic. Julian's dates can be surmised from various sources: Julian herself wrote that she experienced her revelations when she was thirty and a half years old in May 1373 (in chapters 2 and 3 of her Revelations), and the author of the preface to the so-called Short Text version of Julian's writings stated she was still alive in 1413. The celebrated mystic Margery Kempe wrote about her visit to Julian, which probably occurred in 1413. She is also mentioned by name in Isabel Ufford's will, which is dated 1416. The English antiquarian Francis Blomefield incorrectly wrote in the second volume of his History of the County of Norfolk that Julian was still alive in 1442. (Note: Blomefield wrote that Julian was still alive in the year "Anno Domini mccccxlii", whereas MS 37790 (the Short Text manuscript) reads "anno domini millesimo ccccxiii". The author Grace Jantzen highlighted this thirty-year difference between the two dates, also noting that the existence of several different women of that name in Norwich became a source of confusion for historians, and that Blomefield was most likely referring to another woman of that name. Note also that to change "mccccxiii" (1413) to "mccccxlii" (1442) requires only one misread or miscopied character.)

Throughout her life Julian lived in the city of Norwich, an important commercial and religious centre in England during the Middle Ages. The Black Death of 1348–1350, the Peasants' Revolt of 1381, and the suppression of the Lollards, all occurred during her lifetime.

In 1373, seriously ill and convinced she was close to death, the 30-year-old Julian received a series of visions, or 'shewings', of the Passion of Christ. All the revelations but one appeared to her over a period of several hours during one night; the last occurred a day later. After recovering from her illness, Julian lived the rest of her life as an anchoress, in a cell attached to St Julian's Church.

Details of her life remain unknown, but she is known with certainty to have existed, as she was the recipient of a number of wills, and she is mentioned in an account by Kempe, who met her at her cell in Norwich. It is not known for certain whether the name Julian was adopted once she became a recluse: the authors Liz McAvoy and Barry Windeatt have both commented on the lack of historical evidence that the true names of anchoresses were ever changed to match the patron saint of the church they belonged to, pointing out that Julian was a common girl's name during the Middle Ages, and McAvoy notes that Julian is the old form of the modern name Gillian.

Julian referred to herself in her writings as "a simple creature unlettered", a phrase perhaps used to avoid antagonising her readers, especially in the ecclesiastical hierarchy. The term unlettered in the Middle Ages might have meant that she was herself illiterate, or that she did not receive a formal education, rarely available to laywomen. The city contained many convents whose orders recognized the importance of education. Many had boarding schools for girls, where they were taught to read and write. Scholars are not sure whether Julian attended such a school. It is possible that Julian had an educated brother and became literate through him.

== Julian's writings ==
Revelations of Divine Love is unique, as no other work written by an English anchoress seems to have survived. It is the first book in English known to have been written by a woman. In the 14th century, women in England were generally barred from high-status clerical positions or other authoritative roles such as teaching, and their knowledge of Latin, the lingua franca of the day, would have been limited. It is more likely that they read and wrote in Middle English, their vernacular language, as Julian did. Her life was contemporaneous with four other English mystics—Walter Hilton, Richard Rolle, Margery Kempe, and the unknown author of the work known as The Cloude of Unknowing—all of whom wrote in the vernacular. The historian Janina Ramirez has suggested that their use of Middle English was a sensible choice, considering the inexplicable nature of what they were attempting to describe, as they could "couch their theological ruminations more as personal encounters with the divine". Julian's writings were not mentioned at all in any bequests, in which personal libraries of lay or monastic books were distributed within wills, as often happened for male authors at that time.

Some Middle English spiritual texts were written for a specific readership, such as The Cloude of Unknowyng, which was intended by the author to be read by a young hermit, but Julian wrote as if for a general readership. There is no evidence that her writings influenced other medieval authors, or were read by more than a very few people, until 1670, when her book was first published by Serenus de Cressy under the title XVI Revelations of Divine Love, Shewed to a Devout Servant of Our Lord, called Mother Juliana, an Anchorete of Norwich: Who lived in the Dayes of King Edward the Third. Since then the book has been published under a variety of different titles, (Note: The usual title of Julian of Norwich's work, Revelations of Divine Love, originated from the title provided by Cressy in 1670. That title and all subsequent ones (e.g., Harford Comfortable words for Christ's lovers (1911); Colledge & Walsh A Book of Showings to the Anchoress Julian of Norwich (1978); Crampton The Shewings of Julian of Norwich (1993)), are editorial choices.) Since the 1960s, a number of new editions and renderings of her book into modern English have appeared, as well as publications about her.

== Surviving manuscripts ==
The book now commonly known as Revelations of Divine Love was written in manuscript form by Julian in two versions, now known as the Long Text and the Short Text, both of which contain an account of each of her revelations. They were written whilst she was living as an anchoress, enclosed in her cell attached to St Julian's Church, with the Short Text being completed soon after Julian had recovered from her illness. Complete versions of the extended version of her writings known as the Long Text—in which she developed her ideas over a period of decades—survive in the form of three separate manuscripts. Three partial copies of the Long Text are also known to exist.

The Short Text is known from a single manuscript. The number of copies of the Long Text that once existed, but are now lost, is not known: Windeatt refers to the three surviving manuscripts of the Long Text as being copied "perhaps from now-lost medieval manuscripts or copies of these", and the authors Nicholas Watson and Jacqueline Jenkins acknowledge the existence of unknown "earliest copies".

=== The Long Text ===
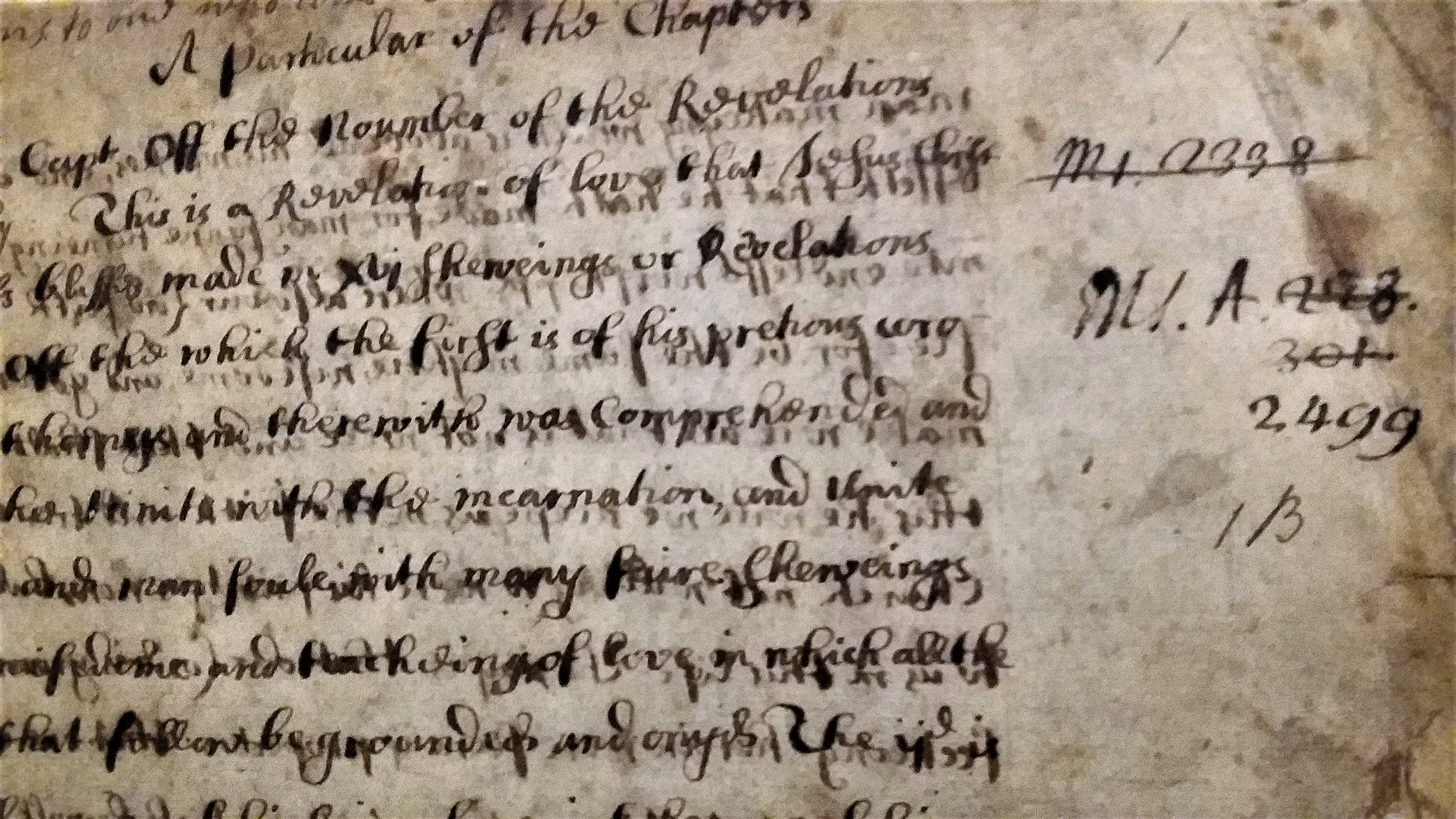
Part of the first chapter of the Long Text (BL, Sloane 2499)

The Long Text does not seem to have been widely circulated in late medieval England. The one surviving medieval manuscript, the mid- to late‑fifteenth century Westminster Manuscript, contains a portion of the Long Text, refashioned as a didactic treatise on contemplation.

The three complete manuscripts of the text fall into two groups, with slightly different readings. The late 16th-century Brigittine Long Text manuscript was produced by exiled nuns in the Antwerp region. Now referred to as "MS Fonds Anglais 40" (previously known as "Regius 8297") or simply the Paris Manuscript, and consisting solely of a copy of Julian's Long Text, it resides in the Bibliothèque nationale de France in Paris. The other two surviving manuscripts, "Sloane MS 2499" and "Sloane MS 3705", now form part of the British Library's Sloane Collection. The Paris Manuscript and "Sloane MS 2499" are named by Watson and Jenkins as "the main witnesses to the text".

==== Provenance of the Long Text manuscripts ====
The Paris Manuscript (BnF fonds anglais 40), a manuscript consisting of the Long Text, was probably copied near Antwerp in imitation of an early-sixteenth-century hand in c. 1580, travelled from there to Rouen, was sold by the Bridgettine monastic community, and was then owned by Jean Bigot of Rouen during the second half of the 17th century, before being bought for the French royal collection in 1706.

A number of manuscripts can be associated with exiled English Benedictine nuns based at the French town of Cambrai:

- BL Sloane MS 2499, a version of the Long Text, was probably copied c. 1650 by Mother Anne Clementina Cary (died 1671), of the Paris convent that was founded as the sister house of Cambrai in 1651. It seems to follow a different manuscript from the one which the Paris Manuscript follows.
- BL Stowe MS 42, a version of the Long Text, was written sometime between 1650 and 1670 (or possibly up to 1700). It served either as exemplar text for Cressy's 1670 printed edition of the Long Text, or possibly a hand-written copy of Cressy. It was possessed in turn by: John Haddon Hindley; the 1st Duke of Buckingham and Chandos and his son the 2nd duke; and Bertram Ashburnham, the 4th Earl of Ashburnham and his son the 5th Earl, from whom the British Museum purchased the manuscripts in 1883.
- The manuscript now known as "Upholland MS" was possibly copied in the 1670s or 1680s by the exiled English Benedictine nun Barbara Constable (1617–1684) in Cambrai. A copy of this manuscript is known to have been kept at Stanbrook Abbey, part of an anthology containing fragments copied from Cressy's Long Text. According to the author Elisabeth Dutton, "Upholland MS" was based on a "Paris-like" version of the Long Text. Once owned by St Joseph's College, Up Holland, and now privately owned and kept at an unknown location, it is a set of excerpts from Julian's book. The text used to make the copy appears to be the same as that Cressy which used for his 1670 translation.
- BL Sloane MS 3705, a version of the Long Text, was copied from BL Sloane MS 2499 later in the 17th century or early 18th century by Cambrai nuns for use in Paris.
- St Mary's Abbey, Colwich, "MS Baker 18", known as the Gascoigne fragments, was copied by Sister Margaret Gascoigne (1608–1637) of Cambrai. Consisting of meditations on fragments of four chapters of the Long Text based on the Paris manuscript, it arrived in England after the French Revolution.

==== The Westminster Manuscript ====
The one surviving medieval manuscript to contain Julian's writings, the mid- to late-fifteenth-century Westminster Manuscript, contains a portion version of the Long Text, refashioned as a didactic treatise on contemplation.

It is part of a medieval florilegium, now known as "Westminster Cathedral Treasury, MS 4", which was inscribed on parchment c. 1450–1500. The manuscript has '1368' written on the opening folio. Along with Revelations of Divine Love, "Westminster Cathedral Treasury, MS 4" also contains commentaries on Psalms 90 and 91, purportedly by the 14th century Augustinian mystic Walter Hilton, and a compilation of Hilton's The Scale of Perfection. During the 16th century it was owned by the Catholic Lowe family. In 1821, Bishop James Bramson made a hand calculation of the age of the manuscript on its endpaper. Rediscovered in August 1955, it is kept in the archives of Westminster Abbey, on loan from Westminster Cathedral.

=== The Short Text ===
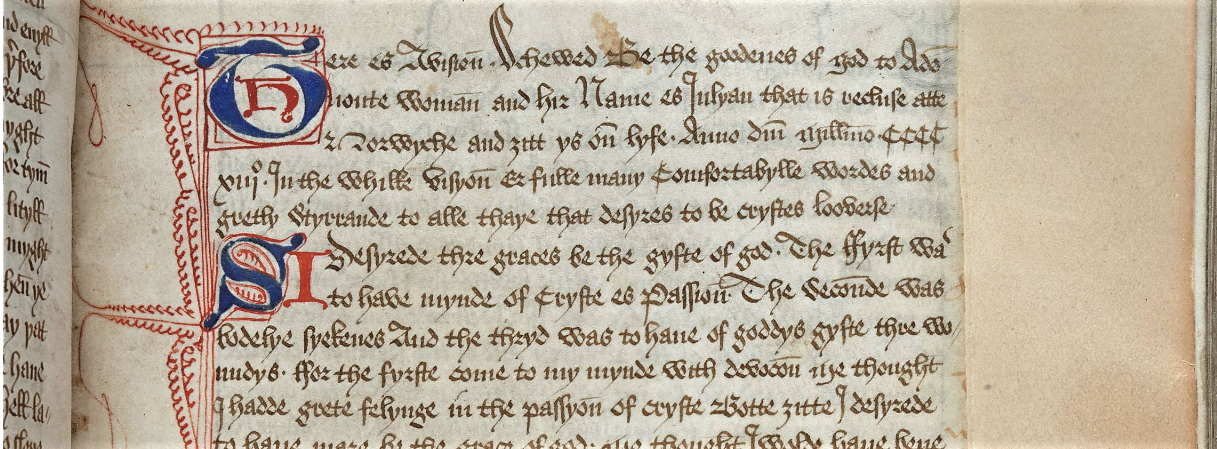
The beginning of the 15th-century Short Text. "Here es a vision schewed be the goodenes of god to a devoute woman and hir name es Julyan that is recluse atte Norwyche and zitt ys on lyfe anno domini millesimo ccccxiii" (BL, Add MS 37790)

It is thought unlikely that the Short Text, thought to have been completed shortly after Julian's recovery from her illness in 1373, was ever read by others whilst she was still alive. The text was instead copied after her death, and then largely forgotten. It remained hidden following the English Reformation, as ownership of any copies of her work would have been considered heretical by the religious authorities.

The sole surviving medieval copy of the Short Text was—until its reappearance in 1910—thought to have been lost. It is part of an anthology of theological works in Middle English, now known as "Additional MS 37790". It was copied c. 1450 by James Grenehalgh (born c. 1470) for the Carthusian community at Syon Abbey. The manuscript acknowledges Julian as the author of the Short Text and includes the date 1413.

The manuscript was obtained for the library of the English astrologer and astronomer Vincent Wing (1619–1668) and was at a later date acquired by the English antiquary Francis Peck (d. 1743). The copy is known to have been seen by Francis Blomefield when the manuscript was in Peck's possession, as Blomefield quoted from it in his 1745 work An essay towards a topographical history of the county of Norfolk. During the eighteenth century it was owned by the scientist and collector William Constable (1721–1791) of Burton Constable Hall, in Yorkshire, before being sold on 14 June 1889 at Sotheby's to the politician and collector Lord Amherst of Hackney (1835–1909). As part of the sale of the library of Lord Amherst of Hackney, which took place on 24 March 1910, the manuscript was purchased by the British Museum. "Additional MS 37790"—once known as the Amherst Manuscript—is now held in the British Library in London.

== Published editions ==
=== Full texts ===
Serenus de Cressy, a confessor for the English nuns at Cambrai, published a translation—probably in England—of the Paris Manuscript in 1670. Copies exist in eleven British libraries, including the British Library and Dr Williams's Library in London. There is also a copy in Berlin, and three copies in the United States.

Cressy's book was reprinted in 1843 in an edition by George Parker, which included biographical details about Cressy, and a detailed glossary. The American Roman Catholic priest Isaac Hecker reprinted Cressy's book in 1864, noting in his preface "how sweetly the voice of piety sounded in our good old Saxon tongue". In 1902 the Irish Jesuit priest George Tyrrell published another version of the book, which included a detailed preface.

Modern interest in the text increased with the 1877 publication of a new edition by Henry Collins, and still further with the 1901 publication of the Scottish translator Grace Warrack's version of the book. The first modern translation, it included, according to the author Georgia Ronan Crampton, a "sympathetic informed introduction". It was based on "MS Sloane 2499", introduced early twentieth-century readers to Julian's writings, and was republished nine times (with revisions) before Warrack's death in 1932. Only one other complete version of the Long Text appeared in English between 1902 and 1958: Dom Roger Hudleston's translation of the Sloane manuscript, published in 1927.

In 1910, Gabriel Meunier produced an edition in French, Révélations de l’amour divin, with a second edition made in 1925. During the 1970s, several new versions of the book were published: Marion Glasscoe, A Revelation of Divine Love, produced by the University of Exeter in 1976, and revised in 1989; Roland Maisonneuve's edition, Le Petit Livre des révélations (1976); Etienne Baudry, Une revelation de l'amour de Dieu: version brève des "Seize révélations de l'amour divin" (Begrolles en Mauges, 1977); and A Book of Showings to the Anchoress Julian of Norwich, an edition in two volumes by Edmund Colledge and James Walsh (PIMS, 1978).

In the 1990s, Georgia Ronan Crampton produced The Shewings of Julian of Norwich, (West Michigan University, TEAMS, 1993) and Frances Beer produced Revelations of Divine Love, (Carl Winter Universitätsverlag, 1998). New editions of Julian's book published this century include: Sr Anna Maria Reynolds, and Julia Bolton Holloway, Julian of Norwich: Extant Texts and Translation (Sismel, 2001); Denise N. Baker, The Showings of Julian of Norwich (Norton, 2004); Nicholas Watson and Jacqueline Jenkins, The writings of Julian of Norwich (Brepols, 2006); Elisabeth Dutton, Julian of Norwich: A Revelation of Love (Yale University Press, 2010); and Barry Windeatt, Julian of Norwich: Revelations of Divine Love (OUP, 2015).

The Short Text was first published in English by the Reverend Dundas Harford, the vicar of Emmanuel Church, West Hampstead, in 1911, shortly after its discovery. (Note: The surviving manuscript of the Short Text contains twenty-five chapters and is about 11,000 words long. It is now kept in the British Library.)

Texts and manuscripts relating to Revelations of Divine Love. Following the publication of the Warrack edition, Julian's name spread rapidly and she has become a topic in many lectures and writings. Many editions of her book have been published, and it has been translated into French, German, Italian, Finnish, Norwegian, Swedish, Danish, Dutch, Catalan, Greek, Korean, Chinese, Modern Hebrew and Russian.

=== Extracts ===
After the death of Dame Margaret Gascoigne in 1637, the Benedictine monk Fr. Augustine Baker edited a treatise including two brief passages by Julian, which was kept in Paris until 1793. The original treatise (now named 'MS Baker 18') is now kept at St Mary's Abbey, Colwich.

== Contents ==
=== Initial chapters ===
The Long Text of Revelations of Divine Love is divided into 87 chapters, if a postscript written by a medieval scribe is included as a final chapter, as in the edition by Grace Warrack. The first three chapters comprise the introduction. All the remaining chapters except chapter 87 describe Julian's revelations, each of which is given between one and twenty-two chapters.

The first chapter begins: This is a Revelation of Love that Jesus Christ, our endless bliss, made in Sixteen Shewings, or Revelations particular. This is followed by a sentence or two describing each of the sixteen visions in turn. The second chapter is partly autobiographical. Julian mentions her illness, but in a spiritual manner. She reflects on three 'gifts' from God: meditation on the Passion of Christ, meditation on her own suffering, and the gift of greater piety (which she calls 'wounds'). In the third chapter, which concludes the introduction, Julian writes more concretely about the events of her illness and her preparation for death by receiving the last rites. The introduction ends with Julian's recounting of her sudden recovery as she lay on her deathbed gazing at a shining image of the cross.

=== The revelations ===
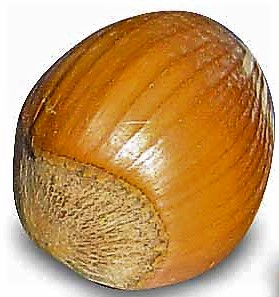

"And in þis he shewed me a lytil thyng þe quantite of a hasyl nott. lyeng in þe pawme of my hand as it had semed. and it was as rownde as eny ball. I loked þer upon wt þe eye of my vnderstondyng. and I þought what may þis be. and it was answered generally thus. It is all þat is made. I merueled howe it myght laste. for me þought it myght sodenly haue fall to nought for lytyllhed. & I was answered in my vnderstondyng. It lastyth & euer shall for god louyth it. and so hath all thyng his begynning by þe loue of god. In this lytyll thyng I sawe thre propertees. The fyrst is. þt god made it. þe secunde is þet god louyth it. & þe þrid is. þat god kepith it."

And in this he showed me a little thing, the quantity of a hazelnut, lying in the palm of my hand, it seemed, and it was as round as any ball. I looked thereupon with the eye of my understanding, and I thought, 'What may this be?' And it was answered generally thus: 'It is all that is made.' I wondered how it could last, for I thought it might suddenly fall to nothing for little cause. And I was answered in my understanding: 'It lasts and ever shall, for God loves it; and so everything has its beginning by the love of God.' In this little thing I saw three properties; the first is that God made it; the second is that God loves it; and the third is that God keeps it.

— Julian of Norwich, Revelations of Divine Love, chapter V "Westminster Cathedral Treasury, MS 4"
1. Julian sees "red blood trickling down from under the Crown of Thorns" on a crucifix. She comprehends that the Holy Trinity is understood when Jesus appears. She sees his mother Mary as a young girl, and comprehends her nature. Jesus shows Julian "a little thing, the size of a hazelnut" as a sign of his love.
2. Julian sees a part of the Passion of Jesus upon his face, and her understanding is deepened by being guided down to the bottom of the sea.
3. Julian observes God and understands that he is present in all things, and does everything.
4. Julian sees Jesus's blood covering him as it flows from his wounds, flowing through Hell, Heaven and Earth. She writes that her sins are better washed away with his blood than with water.
5. The Devil is defeated by the death of Jesus on the cross. Julian sees "our Lord scorn his malice and discount his powerlessness".
6. God reigning in his house in heaven expresses his appreciation of Julian's service and suffering. He shows her the "three degrees of bliss which every soul shall have in heaven who has willingly served God".
7. Frequent alternating experiences of joy and sorrow are revealed to Julian, who understands that "it is helpful for some souls to feel in this way".
8. Jesus approaches death, and his body decays as it dries. Julian resists the temptation to put herself in danger by looking away from the cross. She is shown "the essence of natural love and pain".
9. Jesus declares his pleasure at having suffered for Julian, and that he would suffer more. He shows her three heavens: the pleasure; the joy; and the delight of the Trinity.
10. Jesus is revealed to Julian as he gazes into his own wound.
11. Jesus shows Julian his mother Mary, now "high and noble and glorious".
12. Jesus shows himself to Julian, and speaks words she confesses are beyond her understanding.
13. A long revelation (13 chapters), in which Jesus informs Julian that "sin is befitting", but that "all shall be well, and all shall be well, and all manner of things shall be well". (shall = 'must'; befitting = necessary'). God is more satisfied with Man's atonement than he regarded the fall of man as being harmful.
14. Within the 22 chapters of this long revelation about prayer, it is revealed to Julian that God is always merciful if he receives prayers.
15. Jesus promises Julian that her suffering will stop and that she will go to heaven. She sees a body, from which a soul in the form of a child arises.
16. God reassures Julian that her revelations are authentic.

=== Analysis ===
Distribution of the number of chapters in each revelation, and breakdown of the chapters by size, based on Warrack's edition. At over 4000 words long, the 51st chapter is by far the largest in the book.

Modern translations of Revelations of Divine Love all include commentaries on Julian and her writings. Other separately published commentaries include those by Father John-Julian's Love's Trinity: A Companion to Julian of Norwich (2009), and Veronica Mary Rolf's Julian's Gospel: Illuminating the Life and Revelations of Julian of Norwich (2013). Scholars of Julian all acknowledge that her writings are neither only a record of her experiences, nor solely devotional, and that she fully intended them to be accessible to others.

According to the translator Grace Warrack, the central theme of her book is God as love: "To Julian, the only shewing of God that could ever be... ...was the Vision of Him as Love." Philip Sheldrake notes that her teachings focus on "a God whose meaning is love and only love", and that Julian uses "feminine, specifically motherly imagery for God".

==== Differences between the Long Text and Short Text ====
Much of the content of Julian's Short Text is repeated in the Long Text. Some passages were re-written, but much of the wording and many of the phrases of the Short Text were retained in the Long Text. It can be considered as a commentary on the Short Text, with extensive meditations on each of the revelations written as additional passages, woven by Julian into the fabric of her original words. More than 80% of the Short Text is "reproduced verbatim" in the Long Text, while less than 5% of the Short Text is "rewritten but recognizable" in the Long Text, and less than 10% of the Short Text seems to have been "deliberately omitted."

The Short Text has the character of a narrative of an experience of revelation, but Julian's later writings bear witness to her later perception of God, of herself, and of her evencristens ('fellow Christians'), all being developed during her years as a recluse. Missing from the Short Text is the parable of the Lord and the Servant, and the chapters on Christ our Mother.

Julian's writings reveal almost nothing about her home, her life or the times she lived in: the few details in the Short Text that involve other people included (such as the boy accompanying the priest on his visit to Julian during her illness) were removed during the process of writing the Long Text.

==== The style of Julian's prose ====
Most of the chapters in the Long Text begin with a short abstract of what Julian saw, followed by details of her experiences and a commentary section. The longest chapter, Chapter 51, is an 'exemplum', which was used, according to the author Philip Sheldrake, to "inform, edify, persuade and motivate the listeners". The chapter contains Julian's parable of the Lord and the Servant, considered by Sheldrake to be important for helping the reader to understand Julian's theology. The final chapter is a reflection of all of the previous ones, as explained by Julian: "This book has been begun by God's gift and his grace, but it has not yet been completed, as I see it. We all pray together to God for charity, thanking, trusting and rejoicing by the working of God. This is how our good Lord wills that we pray to him, according to the understanding I drew from all of what he intended us to learn and from the sweet words he spoke most cheerfully, 'I am the ground of your beseeching.'"

Each of the revelations is composed of visual images, fully articulated words and spiritual events. Most of the images focus on aspects of the Passion of Jesus, for example as in Chapter 4, when Julian depicts Jesus' blood flowing from the crown of thorns: "In this sodenly I saw the rede blode trekelyn downe fro under the garlande hote and freisly and ryth plenteously, as it were in the time of His passion that the garlande of thornys was pressid on His blissid hede". However, her visions of the Passion leave out much of the Biblical story. She discusses the nature of God, sin, and prayer, and the theology of creation, and speaks of the Trinity at length. Her commentaries include a discussion of the idea of 'Jesus Christ as Mother': without describing Jesus as a woman, she understands him to embody the qualities of motherhood. Secular images in the text include Julian's vision of the hazelnut placed in the palm of her hand.

Julian's revelations vary in length, type and content. Some (e.g. the first, second and eighth revelations) provide a detailed description of Christ's face and body. Contrasting with these is one such as the short twelfth revelation, a single chapter of a few hundred words, which lacks any imagery. According to Julian, this revelation transcended her wits "and all my understanding and all my powers...".

Translators of Julian's book have had to deal with her obscure words by modernising them, sometimes by correcting spellings into recognisable words without realising that their meanings have shifted over time. Windeatt notes the difficulties for any translator wishing to maintain Julian's original content, whilst still producing a text suitable for a contemporary audience. According to Georgia Ronan Crampton, Julian's writing displays an intellectualism such as a "conspicuous meticulousness in [the] disposal of prepositions", an indication that Julian was highly literate.

A section from Chapter 3 of the Long Text can be used as an illustration of how the translation of Julian's words has been approached by different editors:

Middle English	Collins, 1877 (p. 10)	Warrack, 1907 (p. 7)	Windeatt, 2015 (p. 43)
After this my sight began to failen and it was all derke about me in the chamber as it had be night, save in the image of the Cross wherein I beheld a com[m]on light, and I wiste not how. All that was beside the Cross was uggely to me as if it had be mekil occupyed with the fends. After this the other party of my body began to dyen so ferforth that onethys I had ony feleing, with shortnesse of onde; and than I went sothly to have passid.	After this my sight began to fail; it waxed as dark about me in the chamber as if it had been night, save in the image of the cross, wherein I beheld a common light, and I wist not how. All that was beside the cross was ugly and fearful to me, as it had been much occupied with fiends. After this the over part of my body began to die, so far forth that scarce I had any feeling; my most pain was shortness of breath, and failing of life.	After this my sight began to fail, and it was all dark about me in the chamber, as if it had been night, save in the Image of the Cross whereon I beheld a common light; and I wist not how. All that was away from the Cross was of horror to me, as if it had been greatly occupied by the fiends. After this the upper part of my body began to die, so far forth that scarcely I had any feeling;—with shortness of breath. And then I weened in sooth to have passed.	After this my sight began to fail and all grew dark around me in the room, as though it had been night, except for the image of the cross in which I saw a light for all mankind—I did not know how. Everything apart from the cross was ugly to me, as if it had been much crowded with fiends. After this the upper part of my body began to die to such as extent that I hardly had any sensation. My greatest pain was my shortness of breath and the ebbing away of life.

Julian's style of English appears simple in form and lacks more complicated sounding words, but she expresses complex ideas and deep emotions. According to Windeatt, "a subtle patterning of words and clauses contributes to Julian's meaning". Windeatt notes that to modern readers, Julian's sentences can seem overlong, as she wrote in such a way that ideas "appear to circle their subject in building towards an accumulated understanding". She evolved her ideas after years of contemplation upon her visions.

== Sources and printed versions of the book ==
- Baker, Denise N. (September 1993). "Julian of Norwich and Anchoritic Literature". Mystics Quarterly. 19 (4): 148–161. JSTOR 20717181. (registration required)
- Beer, Frances (1992). Women and Mystical Experience in the Middle Ages. Woodbridge: Boydell Press. ISBN 978-0-85115-302-5.
- Blomefield, Francis; Parkin, Charles (1805) [First published 1739–75]. An essay towards a topographical history of the county of Norfolk. Vol. 4. London: Printed for W. Miller. OCLC 560883605.
- Crampton, Georgia Ronan (1993). The Shewings of Julian of Norwich. Kalamazoo, Michigan: Western Michigan University. ISBN 978-1-879288-45-4.
- Dutton, Elisabeth M. (2008). Julian of Norwich: The Influence of Late-medieval Devotional Compilation. Cambridge: D.S. Brewer. ISBN 978-1-84384-181-4.
- Holloway, Julia Bolton (2016). Julian among the Books: Julian of Norwich's Theological Library. Newcastle upon Tyne: Cambridge Scholars Publishing. ISBN 978-1-4438-8894-3.
- Howells, Edward; McIntosh, Mark Allen, eds. (2020). The Oxford Handbook of Mystical Theology. Oxford University Press. ISBN 978-0-19-872238-0.
- Jantzen, Grace (2000). Julian of Norwich: Mystic and Theologian. New York: Paulist Press. ISBN 978-0-809-13991-0.
- Julian of Norwich (1998). Spearing, Anthony Colin; Spearing, Elizabeth (eds.). Revelations of Divine Love. London, New York: Penguin Books. ISBN 978-1-101-48888-1.
- Kempster, Hugh (December 1997). "Julian of Norwich: The Westminster Text of a Revelation of Love". Mystics Quarterly. 23 (4): 177–246. JSTOR 20717317.
- Leyser, Henrietta (2002). Medieval Women: a Social History of Women in England 450–1500. London: Phoenix Press. ISBN 978-1-84212-621-9.
- McAvoy, Liz Herbert (2008). A Companion to Julian of Norwich. Woodbridge: Cambridge. ISBN 978-1-84384-172-2.
- McGinn, Bernard (2012). The Varieties of Vernacular Mysticism 1350–1550. New York: Herder & Herder. ISBN 978-0-8245-4392-1.
- Meunier, D. Gabriel (1910). Révélations de l'Amour de Dieu. Traduites par un Bénédictin de Farnborough. Paris: Libraire H. Oudin. OCLC 560165634.
- Newman, Barbara (2011). "Eliot's Affirmative Way: Julian of Norwich, Charles Williams, and Little Gidding". Modern Philology. 108 (3): 427–461. doi:10.1086/658355. ISSN 0026-8232. JSTOR 10.1086/658355. S2CID 162999145.
- Ramirez, Janina (2016). Julian of Norwich: A very brief history. London: SPCK. ISBN 978-0-281-07737-3.
- Rawcliffe, Carol; Wilson, Richard, eds. (2004). Medieval Norwich. London, New York: Hambleton and London. ISBN 978-1-85285-449-2.
- Rolf, Veronica Mary (2013). Julian's Gospel: Illuminating the Life & Revelations of Julian of Norwich. Maryknoll, New York: Orbis Books. ISBN 978-1-62698-036-5.
- Salih, Sarah; Baker, Denise N., eds. (2009). Julian of Norwich's Legacy: Medieval Mysticism and Post-medieval Reception. New York: Palgrave Macmillan. ISBN 978-0-230-60667-8.
- Sheldrake, Philip (2019). Julian of Norwich in God's Sight: Her Theology in Context. Chichester: John Wiley & Sons Ltd. ISBN 978-1-119-09965-9.
- Watson, Nicholas; Jenkins, Jacqueline (2006). The Writings of Julian of Norwich: A Vision Showed to a Devout Woman and A Revelation of Love. Pennsylvania State University Press. ISBN 978-0-271-02908-5.

=== Versions of Revelations of Divine Love ===
==== 17th century, 19th century ====
- Collins, Henry, ed. (1877), Revelations of Divine Love Shewed to a Devout Anchoress, By Name, Mother Julian of Norwich, London: Thomas Richardson and Sons (based on Sloane, with a preface by Henry Collins)
- Cressy, Serenus de (1670). "XVI Revelations of Divine Love, shewed to a devout servant of Our Lord, called Mother Juliana, an Anchorete of Norwich: Who lived in the Dayes of King Edward the Third". British Library Digitised Books. British Library. Archived from the original on 15 July 2021.
1. Parker, George Hargreave, ed. (1843). XVI Revelations of Divine Love... London: S. Clarke.;
2. Hecker, I.T., ed. (1864). XVI Revelations of Divine Love... Boston: Tucknor and Fields.;
3. Tyrrell, George, ed. (1902). XVI Revelations of Divine Love... London: Kegan Paul, Trench, Trübner & Co. Ltd. OCLC 669778715.

==== 20th century ====
- Baudry, Marie-Étienne (1977). Une Révélation de l'amour de Dieu: version brève des "Seize révélations de l'amour divin. Abbaye de Bellefontaine: Bégrolles. ISBN 978-2-85589-057-9.
- Beer, Frances, ed. (1998). Revelations of Divine Love, Translated from British Library Additional MS 37790 : the motherhood of God : an excerpt, translated from British Library MS Sloane 2477. Translated by Beer, Frances. Rochester, New York: D.S. Brewer. ISBN 978-0-85991-453-6.
- Colledge, Edmund; Walsh, James, eds. (1978). A Book of Showings to the Anchoress Julian of Norwich. Toronto: Pontifical Institute of Mediaeval Studies. ISBN 978-0-88844-035-8. (A fully annotated edition of both the Short Text and the Long Text, basing the latter on the Paris manuscript, but using alternative readings from the Sloane manuscript when these were judged to be superior.)
- Del Mastro, M.L. (1977). Revelations of Divine Love. Garden City, New York: Image Books. ISBN 978-0-385-12297-9.
- Glasscoe, Marion (1989). A Revelation of Love (2nd ed.). University of Exeter. OCLC 931206498.
- Harford, Dundas (1911). Comfortable Words for Christ's Lovers: being the visions and voices vouchsafed to Lady Julian, recluse at Norwich in 1373. London: Allenson. OCLC 1042546091.
- Hudleston, Roger (1927). Revelations of Divine Love. shewed to a devout ankress by name Julian of Norwich edited from the mss. with Introductions by Hudleston. Mineola, New York: Dover Publications. ISBN 978-0-486-11358-6.
- Maisonneuve, Roland (1976). Le petit livre des révélations: selon le manuscrit court du British Museum, Amherst Additional 37790. Paris: Editions du Parvis. ISBN 978-2-880-22017-4.
- Reynolds, Frances (1947). An Edition of MS. Sloane 2499 of Sixteen Revelations of Divine Love by Julian of Norwich. University of Leeds. OCLC 12798238.
- Skinner, John, ed. (1997). Revelation of Love. New York: Doubleday. ISBN 978-0-385-48756-6.
- Spearing, Elizabeth; Spearing, A.C. (1998). Revelations of Divine Love: short text and long text. London, New York: Penguin Books. ISBN 978-0-14-044673-9.
- Walsh, James (1961). The Revelations of Divine Love of Julian of Norwich. Translated by Walsh, James. London: Burns and Oates. OCLC 460077005.
- Warrack, Grace, ed. (1907) [First published July 1901]. Revelations of Divine Love, Recorded by Julian, Anchoress at Norwich, 1373. Translated by Warrack, Grace (2nd (March 1907) ed.). London: Methuen and Company.
- Wolters, Clifton (1966). Julian of Norwich: Revelations of Divine Love. Harmondsworth: Penguin. OCLC 968708767.

==== 21st century ====
- Dutton, Elisabeth (2010). A Revelation of Love. New Haven: Yale University Press. ISBN 978-0-300-16516-6.
- Father John-Julian (2009). The Complete Julian of Norwich. Orleans, Massachusetts: Paraclete Press. ISBN 978-1-55725-639-3.
- Father John-Julian (2009). Love's Trinity: a companion to Julian of Norwich. Brewster, Massachusetts: Liturgical Press. ISBN 978-0-81465-308-1.
- Baker, Denise N. (2004). The Showings of Julian of Norwich. W. W. Norton & Company. ISBN 978-0-393-97915-2.
- Reynolds, Anna Maria; Holloway, Julia Bolton, eds. (2001). Showing of Love: Extant texts and translation. Florence: SISMEL. ISBN 978-88-8450-095-3. (A "quasi-facsimile" of each version of the Showing of Love in the Westminster, Paris, Sloane and Amherst manuscripts.)
- Watson, Nicholas; Jenkins, Jacqueline, eds. (2006). The Writings of Julian of Norwich: A Vision Showed to a Devout Woman and A Revelation of Love. Penn State Press. ISBN 978-0-271-02547-6.
- Windeatt, Barry, ed. (2015). Revelations of Divine Love. Oxford University Press. ISBN 978-0-19-811206-8.
- Beckett, Wendy Sr. Narrated (2021) Revelations of Divine Love by Julian of Norwich read by Sister Wendy Beckett Audio CD. ISBN 978-1527281189
