= Grace Warrack =

Scottish watercolour artist and translator

Grace Harriet Warrack
- Born: 29 March 1855; Leith, Edinburgh, Scotland
- Died: 3 January 1932 (aged 76); Edinburgh, Scotland
- Known for: Editing and translating
- Notable work: Revelations of Divine Love, as editor

Grace Harriet Warrack (29 March 1855 – 3 January 1932) was an editor and translator in Edinburgh. She designed and commissioned the stained glass windows in High Kirk of the Free Church of Scotland, the Mound, Edinburgh.

== Biography ==
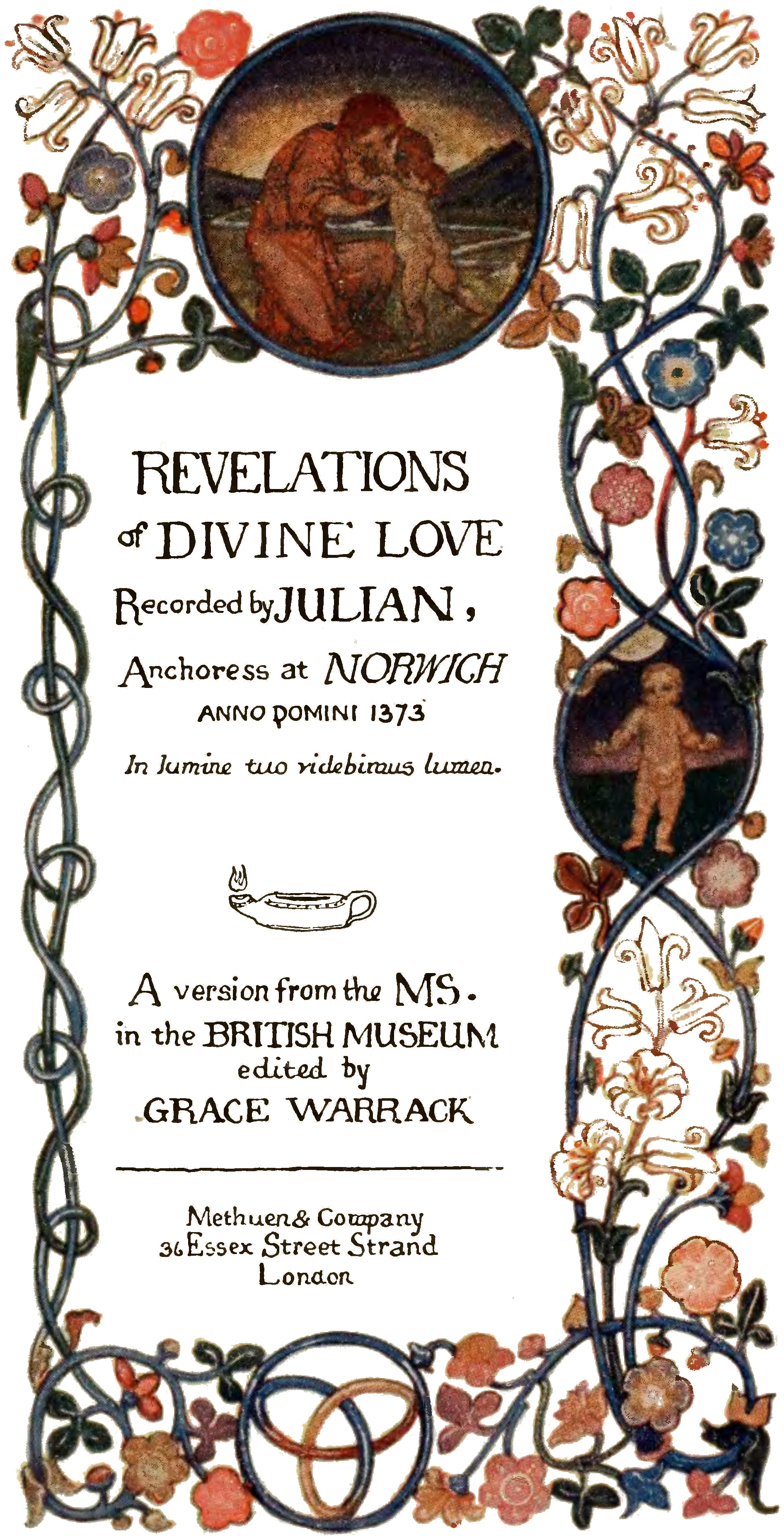
Title page for Revelations of Divine Love

Grace Harriet Warrack was born in Edinburgh on 29 March 1855, the third daughter of John Warrack of Aberdeen and Grace Stratton of Dunkeld.

In 1901 Warrack edited an edition of Revelations of Divine Love, by the medieval mystic Julian of Norwich, from the Sloane 2499 manuscript held in the British Library. The edition was translated into modernised English and introduced early 20th century readers to Julian's writings. The title page was illustrated by the Irish-born artist Phoebe Anna Traquair. Warrack went on to edit and translate collections of Italian folk music and French poetry. She was awarded the Palmes académiques by the French Minister of Public Instruction for her interest in French literature in Scotland.

Warrack worked with the stained glass artist Douglas Strachan to design the windows at the High Kirk of the Free Church of Scotland, now the New College Library, University of Edinburgh. She had been impressed by Strachan's work in Aberdeen and so commissioned work for him in Edinburgh. Her intention was to provide a series of windows in memory of her family, missionary leaders and heroes, and her literary idols. The project took Strachan 20 years to complete, with Warrack spending months considering the design of each window.

== Memorial ==
Warrack died on 3 January 1932. Her sister, Frances Warrack, organised a memorial window in Martyrs’ Kirk, St. Andrews, now the Richardson Research Library, University of St. Andrews. Designed and created by Herbert Hendrie, the window depicts a large angel blessing two smaller angels, bearing the text "Bless the Lord ye his angels".

== Published works ==
- Revelations of Divine Love, 1901
- Little Flowers of a Childhood: The Record of a Child, 1906, described in the Church Quarterly as "A touching little story of a child who died at the age of four"
- Florilegio di canti toscani: Folk Songs of the Tuscan Hills, 1914
- From Isles of the West to Bethlehem, 1921
- Une Guirlande de poésies diverses, 1923
- Dal cor gentil d'Italia, 1925
