= The Julian Meetings =

The Julian Meetings is a loose umbrella organisation for local Christian contemplative prayer groups which meet in the United Kingdom and other English-speaking countries.

== History ==
The 1960s and 1970s saw a revival of interest in the United Kingdom, North America and elsewhere in mysticism and meditation, including the Christian tradition of contemplative prayer. The Julian Meetings is one of several organisations set up to meet this interest and to foster Christian meditation. Others include Contemplative Outreach, which encourages centering prayer, the World Community for Christian Meditation and the Fellowship of Meditation.

The Julian Meetings were founded in 1973, when Hilary Wakeman (an Anglican who in 1994 became one of the first female priests in the Church of England) wrote a letter published in Christian newspapers in the United Kingdom asking if some readers might like to meet together for Christian meditation. This led to the formation of 11 local groups. About a year later the name "The Julian Meetings" was adopted, after Julian of Norwich, although the organisation is not specifically linked to Julian of Norwich's teachings.

Meetings may include a reading, music, pictures or objects, to aid contemplation, but the focus is on silent contemplation.

In 2016, there were some 300 local groups, in the United Kingdom and other anglophone countries, as well as a number of individual members. Individual Julian Meetings are small, welcoming people of all denominations or none. They take place in peoples’ homes, in churches or chapels, meeting rooms and other places.

At the United Kingdom national gathering of the Julian Meetings, on 20 May 2017 in Derby, the keynote speaker was the poet, singer and academic Malcolm Guite, who spoke on poetry and prayer.

== Governance ==
Formal organisation is kept to a minimum, there are no paid staff, and the umbrella organisation is not a charity. Each local meeting is autonomous and responsible for its own finances and pattern of meditation. A National Council, and a smaller Core Group, provide resources and advice to local meetings and perform functions like the production of a magazine, running a website, and organising the occasional national gathering.

Membership is not tied to any particular denominational allegiance: both the umbrella organisation and local meetings are ecumenical.

== Publications ==
- Circles of Silence, Darton, Longman and Todd, 1994: an anthology, edited by Robert Llewelyn to celebrate the 21st anniversary of the Julian Meetings.
- Circles of Stillness, Darton, Longman and Todd, 2002: a sequel to Circles of Silence, edited by Hilary Wakeman.

== Archives ==
Records relating to the Julian Meetings from 1973 to 2016 are held at the Cadbury Research Library, University of Birmingham.
