= St Julian's, Norwich =

Medieval church in Norfolk, England

St Julian
- St Julian's Church, Norwich
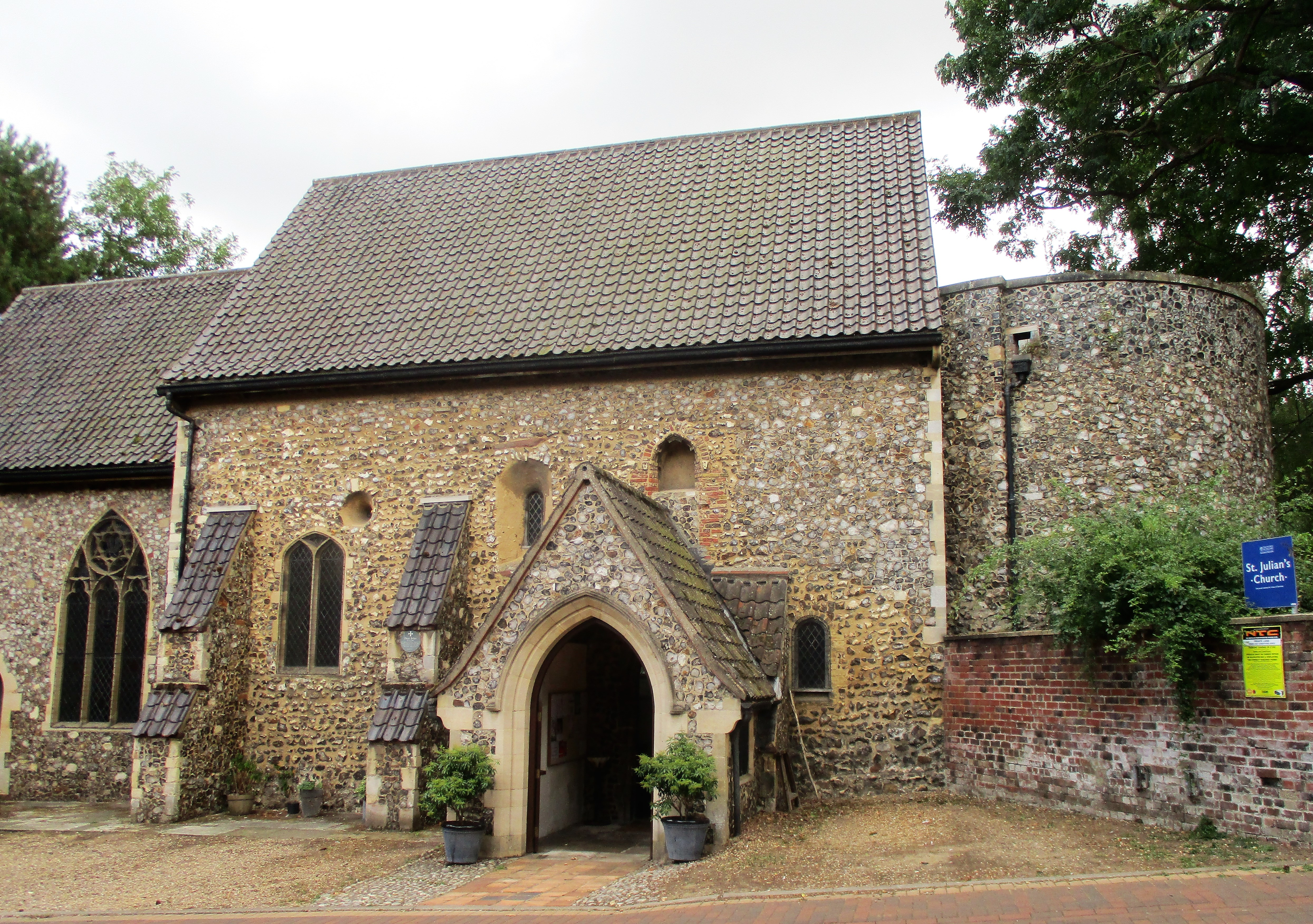
- View from north
- St Julian
- 52°37′29.4″N 1°18′02.4″E
- Location: Norwich, Norfolk
- Country: England
- Denomination: Church of England
- Website: stjohnstimberhill.org

History
- Founded: 11th century
- Dedication: Julian of Le Mans, or possibly Julian the Hospitaller
- Events: Destroyed by bombing in 1942; rebuilt 1953.

Architecture
- Functional status: Active
- Heritage designation: Grade I listed

Administration
- Province: Canterbury
- Diocese: Norwich
- Archdeaconry: Norwich
- Deanery: Norwich East
- Parish: Norwich, St John the Baptist, Timberhill with Norwich St Julian

Clergy
- Priest: Richard Stanton

St Julian's is a Grade I listed parish church in the Church of England in Norwich, England. It is part of the Diocese of Norwich. During the Middle Ages, when the city was prosperous and possibly the second largest city in medieval England, the anchoress Julian of Norwich lived in a cell attached to the original church. The cell was demolished during the 1530s.

Owing to a lack of funds, the church slowly became dilapidated during the 18th century. It underwent a restoration after one side of the building collapsed in 1845. The tower, also in danger of collapsing, was repaired in 1934. In June 1942, St Julian's received a direct hit during the Norwich Blitz. The only one of the five churches destroyed in Norwich during World War II to be rebuilt, it reopened in 1953. The medieval bell, damaged in 1942, was rehung in 1992.

The rebuilt church is a flint building with stone and brick dressings with a pantile roof. A small church, it consists of a nave, single-bay chancel, and a round tower. The south chapel and sacristry and the single-storey porch was added in the 1950s. The octagonal baptismal font, a replacement for the original one destroyed in 1942, was moved from the redundant All Saints' Church in 1977. The church has an 1860 pipe organ, which was installed in 1966.

== Organisation ==
St Julian's is one of the churches of the parish of St John the Baptist, Timberhill, with St Julian's, Norwich, in the Diocese of Norwich. It lies within the deanery of Norwich East and the archdeaconry of Norwich. In January 2023, the Revd Richard Stanton, the interim priest-in-charge of the parish, was appointed priest-in-charge.

The church is open each day of the week for worshippers and visitors as a place of prayer. The Mass is held on Sunday mornings.

== History ==
=== Medieval period ===
An early church on the site of St Julian's Church was destroyed in 1004 when the Vikings attacked Norwich. The medieval church was built in the 11th and 12th centuries. Between 1269 and 1305 the parish associated with the nearby church of St Edward King and Confessor was united with St Julian's.

The original dedication of the church is uncertain; it was possibly dedicated to Julian the Hospitaller, but was also considered to have been dedicated to a female saint, Juliana of Nicomedia. Alan Butler, chaplain to Edward Howard, 9th Duke of Norfolk (1686–1777), suggested that the dedication was to Saint Julian of Le Mans, an idea refuted by the Norwich stonemason Robert Flood in his 1936 booklet A Description of St Julian's Church, Norwich and an Account of Dame Julian's Connection with it. In 1135, Stephen, King of England put the church under the authority of Carrow Abbey. The prioress and nuns appointed the priest at St Julian's, and maintained the church.

By the middle of the 14th century, Norwich likely had a population approaching 25,000, a figure not reached again until the late 16th century. Second only in size to London, it was a relatively wealthy city with a densely populated and prosperous hinterland. Besides possessing a cathedral, it had five monasteries, a convent, and a greater number of parish churches than any city in medieval England other than London. (Note: By the middle of the 13th century, the number of churches in the city had reached around sixty. A gradual process of parish amalgamation, closure and destruction has left 31 remaining medieval churches in the city.) Through its trading links with the Low Countries and the Rhineland, at that time the most fertile areas for religious developments north of the Alps, the region probably had access to new religious ideas then prevalent in northern Europe.

==== Julian of Norwich ====
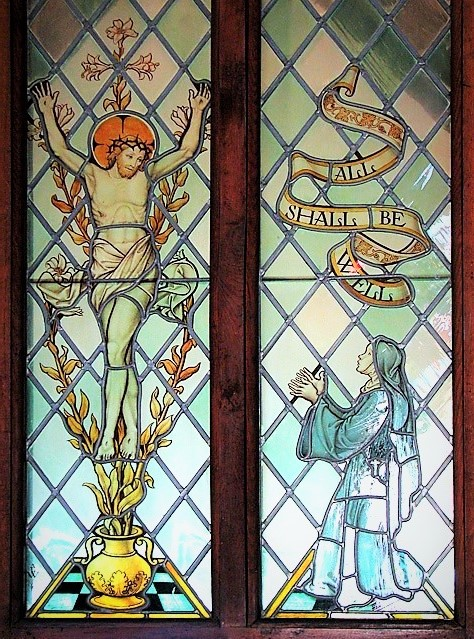
Julian of Norwich depicted in an interior window in the church

During the late Middle Ages, Norwich had an exceptionally large number of hermits and anchorites in comparison with other English towns. The mystic and anchoress (or female recluse) now known as Julian of Norwich lived in a cell attached to the church, which was then in an industrial area of the city, close to the quays of the River Wensum.

Julian was born in 1343 or late 1342; her date of death is unknown, but she is thought to have died after 1416. It is possible that her name may have been taken from St Julian's Church, but Julian was a common girl's name during the 14th century, and it is likely to have been her actual name.

Upon entering her cell for the first time, Julian would have been cut off from the world of the living; the cell door connecting her with the church would have been sealed, with a small window to allow her to witness Mass, and perhaps another to receive callers.

Julian is the first woman whose writings in English have survived. Her book, commonly called Revelations of Divine Love, was written in two versions, now usually referred to as the Short Text and the Long Text. The earlier Short Text was written after she received a series of 16 mystical revelations, following her recovery from an illness that brought her close to death.

It has been speculated that one of the prioresses of Carrow, Edith Wilton, provided Julian with her writing materials. In 1428, another anchoress, Julian (or Juliana) Lampet, was installed in the cell and lived there for 50 years.

=== Decline and restoration ===
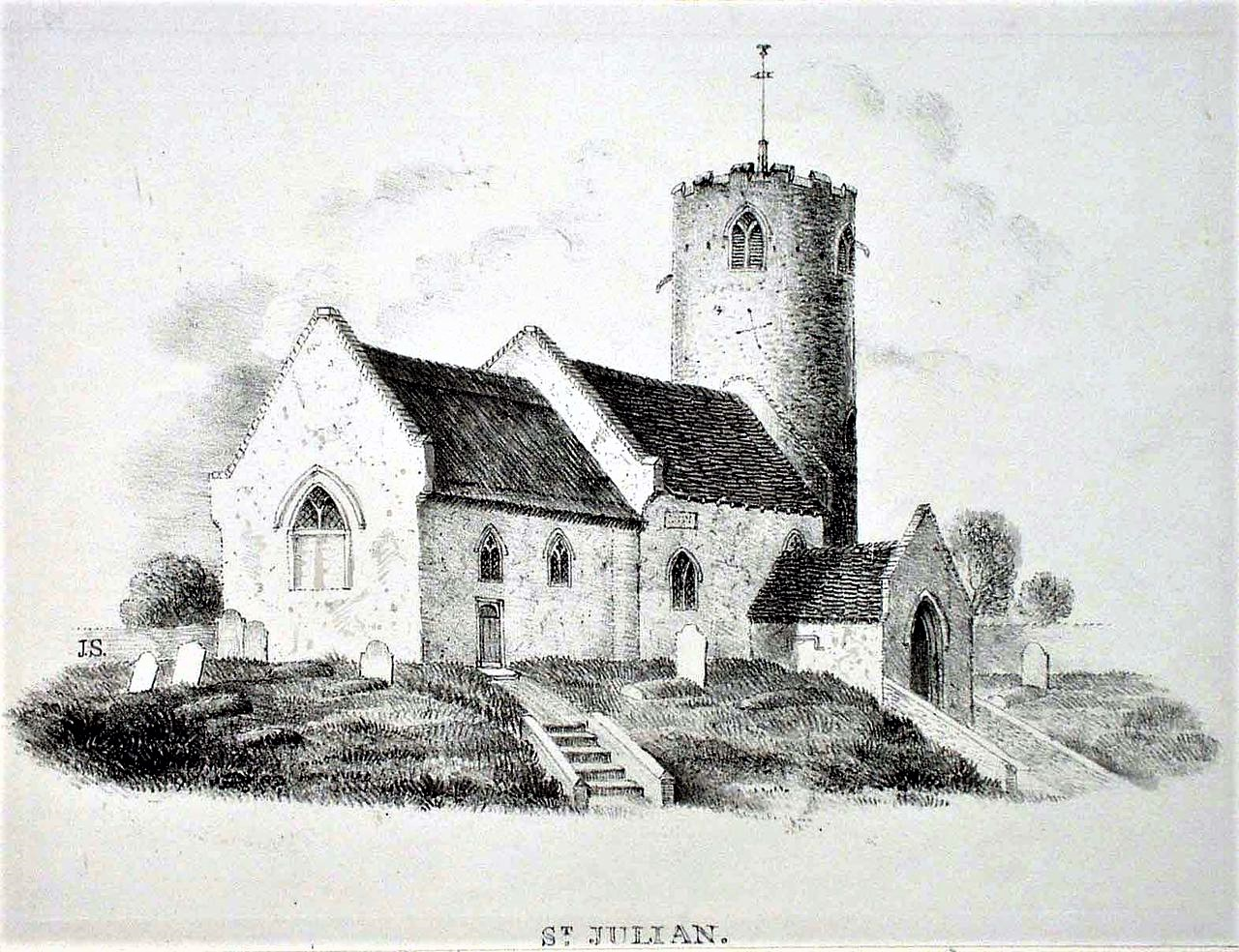
Lithograph of the church by James Sillett (1828), Norwich Museums Collections

As a consequence of the English Reformation, the priory at Carrow was dissolved. No rector was appointed at St Julian's for 45 years, until the appointment of Gawin Browne in 1581. During the Reformation, the cell at St Julian's was demolished.

After merchants ceased living in the area around St Julian's, the church entered a period of slow decline. By 1827, when the church was drawn by the Norfolk artist James Sillett, most of the east window had been blocked up. According to Flood, "Mrs Gunn made fifteen drawings from remains of coloured glass that lay much broken on the floor. No services were held, and the place was overrun with boys." Part of the chancel collapsed in 1845, by which time the church was in a very poor state of repair and no longer in use for services.

Following the collapse of the east wall, an appeal was made for funds, and the church then underwent a restoration. (Note: The records relating to the restoration of the church no longer exist, so that the identity of the restorer is unknown.) The priest's door was blocked up, and the medieval wall paintings and biblical texts were painted over or destroyed, the interior fixtures removed and the vestry built on the south side of the building. The tower's height was reduced, and a new east window was installed. By 1860, the thatching on the roof had been replaced with tiles. By the beginning of the 20th century, the tower was close to collapsing; it was repaired in 1934.

=== Destruction during World War Two, and rebuilding ===
St Julian's suffered almost complete destruction during the Norwich Blitz of 1942. On 27 June, Norwich was attacked by German aircraft dropping incendiaries and high explosives. The church received a direct hit by a high explosive bomb, destroying almost everything except the north wall. After the war, funds were raised to rebuild the church, the only one of the churches destroyed in Norwich during the war that was later rebuilt. Redesigned by the architect A. J. Chaplin, it was reopened in 1953, (Note: The four churches not rebuilt were St Michael-at-Thorn, St Benedict's, St Bartholemew's and St Paul's. St Mary's Plain Baptist Church, the Catholic church in Fishergate, the Trinity Presbyterian Church in Theatre Street, and the synagogue were gutted by fire in the same attack) with a chapel built in place of the long-lost anchorite cell. The Norman south doorway from St Michael at Thorn was incorporated into the reconstruction.

The church's bell was cast in 1450 by the bellfounder Richard Brayser, when it was inscribed with the words 'Ave gracia Plena Dominus Tecum' (Latin meaning "Hail the Lord, full of grace, be with you"). One of the oldest bells in the city, it crashed to the ground and was badly damaged when the church was destroyed. After being repaired, it was returned to the church and rehung in 1992.

== Architecture ==
St Julian's Church was granted Grade I Listed status in 1954. The flint building has stone and brick dressings with a pantile roof. It consists of a nave, the single-bay chancel, a circular west tower, a south chapel, and a vestry.

The remains of the original church possesses a number of Late Anglo-Saxon windows, though the building dates largely to the 11th and 12th centuries. Enough of the north wall has survived to preserve three Anglo-Saxon windows revealed during repairs, two of which are circular.

The round tower was not rebuilt to its former height after the war, but is truncated at the level of the top of the nave. The south chapel and sacristry were added during the 20th century. The single-storey porch was added when the church was rebuilt in the 1950s. The Norman doorway connecting the nave to the chapel is from St Michael at Thorn, a church that, like St Julian's, was destroyed by enemy bombing in 1942.

=== Font ===
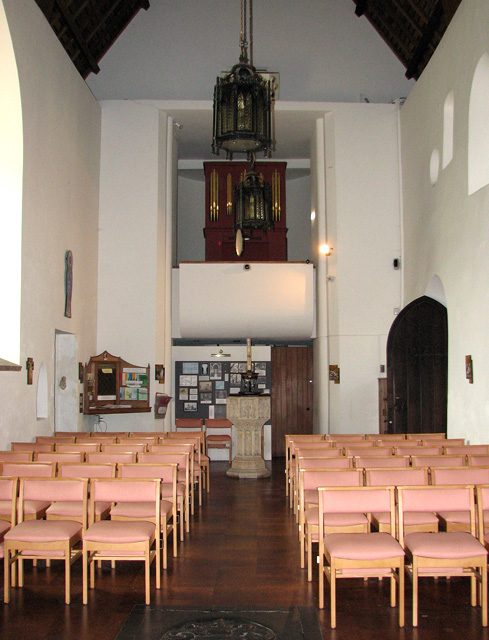
Interior view of the church, facing west

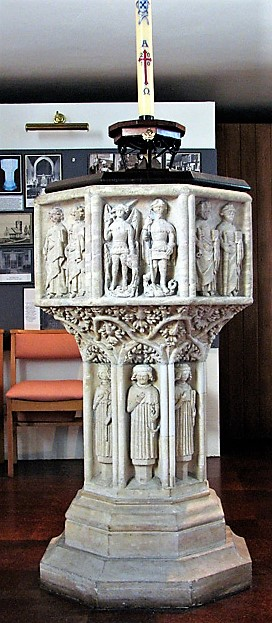
The church's baptismal font

The octagonal baptismal font is a replacement for the original one, which was lost when the church was bombed. The current font was moved from the now redundant All Saints' Church in 1977. It has eight standing figures representing the Apostles, Saint Michael the Archangel, Saint George, and two other saints. (Note: All Saints Church was united with St Julian's from 1760 to 1929.)

=== Organ ===
The church has an organ dating to 1860 by Henry Jones of London, which was installed there in 1966. Originally built for a house in the Essex village of Abbess Roding, it was found in a warehouse in Chelmsford, where it was rebuilt. A specification of the organ can be found on the National Pipe Organ Register.

=== Churchyard ===
In 1906, some stonework, thought to be from the destroyed anchorite's cell, was recovered from the churchyard.

During 2014 and 2015, archaeological work undertaken immediately to the east of the churchyard revealed medieval features, including graves. The work done showed that St Julian's churchyard originally extended eastwards up to King Street. The lost part of the churchyard was developed by the 17th century, but it is not known exactly when this occurred.

== Sources ==
- Finch, Jonathan (2006). "The Churches". In Rawcliffe, Carol; Wilson, Richard (eds.). Medieval Norwich. London: Hambledon and London. pp. 157–189. ISBN 978-1-85285-546-8.
- Flood, Robert (1936). A Description of St. Julian's Church, Norwich and an Account of Dame Julian's Connection with it. Norwich: Wherry Press. OCLC 77655908.
- Marilyn, Oliva (2014) [2004]. "Pygot, Margaret (d. in or after 1474), prioress of Carrow". Oxford Dictionary of National Biography (online ed.). Oxford University Press. doi:10.1093/ref:odnb/105620. ISBN 978-0-198-61412-8. (Subscription, Wikipedia Library access or UK public library membership required.)
- Marilyn, Oliva (2015) [2004]. "Wilton, Edith (d. 1430), prioress of Carrow". Oxford Dictionary of National Biography (online ed.). Oxford University Press. doi:10.1093/ref:odnb/107180. ISBN 978-0-198-61412-8. (Subscription, Wikipedia Library access or UK public library membership required.)
- Pevsner, Nikolaus; Wilson, Bill (2002) [1962]. Norfolk. The Buildings of England. Vol. 1. Norwich and North-East. New Haven, Connecticut; London: Yale University Press. ISBN 978-0-300-09607-1.
- Rutledge, Elizabeth (2006). "Economic Life". In Rawcliffe, Carol; Wilson, Richard (eds.). Medieval Norwich. London: Hambledon and London. pp. 157–189. ISBN 978-1-85285-546-8.
- Tanner, Norman P. (1984). The Church in Late Medieval Norwich, 1370-1532. Toronto: Pontifical Institute of Mediaeval Studies. ISBN 978-08884-4-066-2.
- Upjohn, Sheila; Groves, Nicholas (2018). St Julian's Church Norwich. Norwich: The Friends of Julian of Norwich. ISBN 978-0-954-15246-8.
- Windeatt, Barry, ed. (2015). Revelations of Divine Love. Oxford: Oxford University Press. ISBN 978-0-19-811206-8.
