= William Wilson (artist) =

British artist (1905–1972)

- Born: 21 July 1905; Edinburgh, Scotland
- Died: 16 March 1972 (aged 66); Bury, England
- Awards: Guthrie Award, 1934

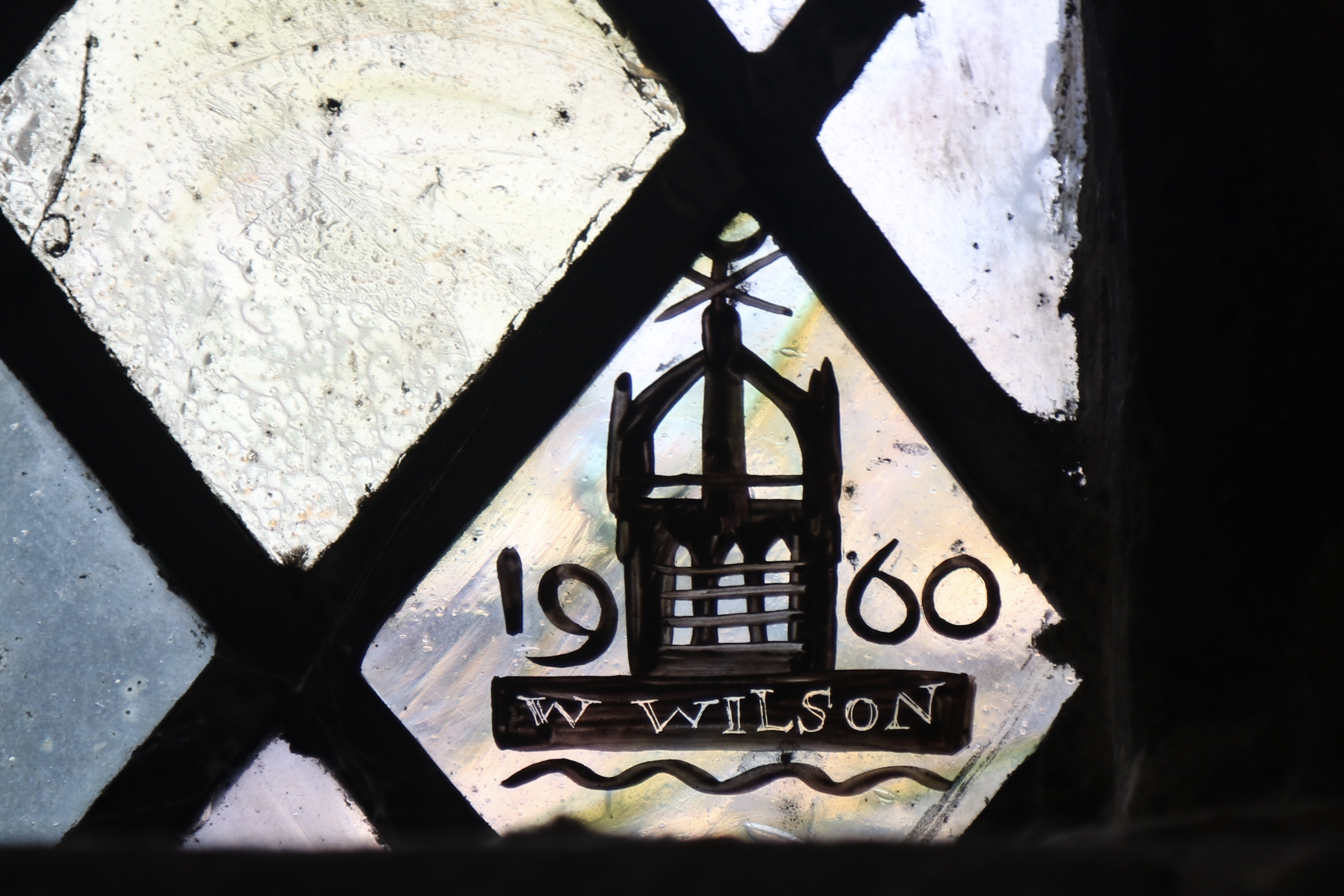
William Wilson's maker's mark in Glasgow Cathedral (1960)

William Wilson (21 July 1905 – 16 March 1972) was a Scottish stained glass artist, printmaker and watercolour painter. He was a member of the Royal Scottish Academy. He was appointed an OBE.

== Biography ==
Wilson learned stained glass making in an apprenticeship with James Ballantyne, and by studying under Herbert Hendrie. In 1932 he was awarded a Carnegie Travelling Scholarship by the Royal Scottish Academy, which he used to study at Edinburgh College of Art under Adam Bruce Thomson and to travel in France, Germany, Italy and Spain. In these travels he made pen and ink drawings of the Italian city of Venice, and the Spanish cities of Madrid, Granada, Ronda, and Toledo. He studied printmaking under Adam Bruce Thomson. In watercolour he belonged to the Edinburgh School. He studied further at the Royal College of Art, London, producing etchings and engravings of subjects such as 'Loch Scavaig, Skye' in the 1930s. Some of his works have been on display at The Scottish Gallery, Edinburgh. He also competed in the art competitions at the 1948 Summer Olympics.

Wilson taught stained glass making at Edinburgh College of Art. He started his own studio in 1937, making stained glass windows for Canterbury Cathedral and a number of Scottish Churches. He slowly became blind through diabetes. As well as religious stained glass, he made secular pieces such as "The Irish Jig" which was originally fitted in his Edinburgh home.

== Works ==
Wilson made the 'exceptional' windows at the Morningside North parish church, Edinburgh, now a community building. An excellent detailed account of the windows he made for Greenbank Parish Church, Edinburgh is available. In 1951 he completed the East window of St Andrew's church in Stamford Hill, as a replacement for the original which had been blown by a V1 during the blitz. He made the East window for Ardwell church, and in 1953, the East windows for St Machar's Cathedral, Aberdeen which depict the Nativity, the Last Supper, the Crucifixion and Christ surrounded by the Scottish saints, and a window for Dunino church, Fife. He made 16 windows between 1952 and 1961 for Brechin Cathedral, Angus, Scotland. He is responsible for four windows in the chapel of the University of St Andrews, though given his increasing blindness the final two may have been partly the work of his assistants.

He created windows in 1958 for the newly completed St. Teresa's Church in Dumfries. One window in the Baptistry depicts Our Lord being baptized by St. John the Baptist, while the window outside the Baptistry portrays St. Joseph as a carpenter at his workbench, with the boy Jesus.

Wilson's largest surviving set of windows is at Craigiebuckler church, Aberdeen. The windows form a single scheme covering the Old Testament and the New Testament of the Bible. One of his last windows is his 1965 stained glass image of St Columba in the Abbey Church, Iona.

== Permanent collections ==
Some of Wilson's works are in the collection of the National Galleries of Scotland. His "Scottish Fishermen" is in Aberdeen Art Gallery.

== Honours and awards ==
Wilson was a member of the Royal Scottish Academy (RSA). He was appointed an OBE.

In 2020, Historic Environment Scotland awarded a plaque to commemorate Wilson. It can be found at 11a Belford Mews, Edinburgh.

== Reception ==
The University of St Andrews describes Wilson as "one of Scotland's great artists, a master of the arts of printmaking, painting and stained glass". Bourne Fine Art note that "in all he did, his style was very distinctive".
