= Herbert Hendrie =

English stained glass artist

- Born: 1887; Manchester
- Died: 1946 (aged 58–59)
- Education: Slade School of Art, Royal College of Art, C.W. Whall
- Known for: Stained glass
- Notable work: Stained glass windows of Liverpool Cathedral

Herbert Hendrie (1887–1946) was an English stained glass artist. He is known for his strong simple designs with scintillating jewel-like effects. Among his best-known works are the fifteen windows for Kippen church and the tall stained glass windows for Liverpool Cathedral.

== Biography ==
Hendrie was born in Manchester. He trained at the Slade School of Art, London and the Royal College of Art, and as a pupil of Christopher Whitworth Whall. He taught at the Edinburgh College of Art for 20 years. He made use of the facilities of Lowndes and Drury (stained glass workers). Among his students were Sax Shaw and Willie Wilson, both of whom went on to become leading stained glass artists.

== Reception ==
He has been called "the most notable Scottish stain[ed] glass designer of the first half of the 20th Century. Archie Milne of Brechin Cathedral described Hendrie as "Noted in particular for small scintillating panes producing a jewel-like effect", and that "His brightly coloured works were regarded by William Wilson to be more successful than those of Douglas Strachan who tended to be extremely detailed while Hendrie kept his designs simple".

== Works ==
Hendrie made the fifteen "superb" windows for Kippen church in the early 1930s. He also made the stained glass windows for the Chapel of St Salvator at the University of St Andrews. He made two windows for Glasgow Cathedral, installed in 1946, and "probably the largest set of windows ever made in Scotland", the 58 feet (17.8m) high windows of Liverpool Cathedral. Among his other works are windows in Scottish churches including St Leonards in St Andrews; St. John's, Perth; Brechin Cathedral; Paisley Abbey; St Margaret's Knightswood; and St. Michael's, Linlithgow. Hendrie is also responsible for a memorial window for Grace Harriet Warrack in Martyr's Kirk, St. Andrews. In England, Hendrie made stained glass windows for St Matthew, Blackmoor; St John the Baptist, Aldenham; Haileybury College, Hertfordshire; St Margaret, Westminster; St Nicholas, Peper Harow, Surrey; St Paul, Woldingham, Surrey; and St Andrew, Edburton.
