= Ronald Nigh =

American ecological anthropologist

- Born: 29 October 1947; Kearney, Nebraska
- Died: September 26, 2024; Mexico City, Mexico
- Education: Stanford University
- Known for: Work on ecological anthropology
- Scientific career
- Fields: anthropologist scholar ethnologist

Ronald Nigh (1947-2024) was an American ecological anthropologist focusing on Caribbean areas and the Maya region in Mesoamerica. Nigh was a professor and researcher at Centro de Investigaciones y Estudios Superiores en Anthropologia Social (CIESAS) for over twenty years, where he conducted research on ecological anthropology and indigenous farming methods.

== Life ==
Ronald Nigh was born October 29, 1947, in Kearney, Nebraska. Nigh attended Stanford University, where he received his BA in Anthropology in 1969. He married Katharine Powers Crocker and the couple moved to Chiapas, Mexico. Nigh continued his education at Stanford and received a MA in Anthropology in 1970 and a Ph.D in Social Anthropology in 1976. His dissertation concentrated on traditional Maya milpa agriculture in the highlands of Chiapas. He then spent one year at a public research institute continuing his work on traditional Maya agriculture and its relationship to biodiversity and forest regeneration.

== Work ==
From 1985 to 1988, Nigh worked for several environmental NGOs, including The Nature Conservancy and Greenpeace, developing programs in Mexico, where he has spent most of his professional career. Nigh was a part of the team who founded DANA, a nonprofit organization dedicated to promoting sustainable agriculture in Mexico and Central America. Nigh briefly taught at the National Autonomous University of Mexico from 2000 to 2002, before becoming a professor at CIESAS, where he conducted anthropological research from 1994 to his death in 2024.

Nigh's experience with ecological anthropology allowed him to collaborate with many scholars on research throughout Mesoamerica. His work focused on promoting biodiversity conservation in the midst of rapid human population growth. Most recently, he collaborated with Dr. Anabel Ford on their book The Maya Forest Garden: Eight Millennia of Sustainable Cultivation of the Tropical Woodlands. Nigh and Ford argue that Maya practices serve as solutions to contemporary problems, such as sustainability, climate change, and natural resource scarcity. Nigh developed a garden-based science-teaching program in farmer communities in Chiapas, and helped launch a doctoral program in sustainable agriculture.

== Notable publications ==
- Nigh, Ronald; Chazdon, Robin L.; Harvey, Celia A.; Komar, Oliver; Griffith, Daniel M.; Ferguson, Bruce G.; Martinez-Ramos, Miguel; Morales, Helda; Soto-Pinto, Lorena; Van Breugel, Michiel; Philpott, Stacy M. (1 March 2009). "Beyond Reserves: A research agenda for conserving biodiversity in human-modified tropical landscapes". Biotropica. 41 (2): 142–153. doi:10.1111/j.1744-7429.2008.00471.x.
- Harvey, Celia A.; Komar, Oliver; Chazdon, Robin; Ferguson, Bruce G.; Finegan, Bryan; Griffith, Daniel M.; Martinez-Ramos, Miguel; Morales, Helda; Nigh, Ronald; Soto-Pinto, Lorena; Van Breugel, Michiel; Wishnie, Mark (1 February 2008). "Integrating agricultural landscapes with biodiversity conservation in the Mesoamerican hotspot". Conservation Biology. 22 (1): 8–15. doi:10.1111/j.1523-1739.2007.00863.x. PMID 18254848.
- Nations, James D.; Nigh, Ronald (1 March 1980). "The evolutionary potential Lacandon Maya sustained-yield tropical forest agriculture". Journal of Anthropological Research. 36 (1): 1–30. JSTOR 3629550.
- Ford, Anabel; Nigh, Ronald (June 2015). The Maya Forest Garden: Eight Millennia of Sustainable Cultivation of the Tropical Woodlands. Walnut Creek, California: Left Coast Press. ISBN 978-1-61132-998-8.
- Gonzalez Cabanez, Alma Amalia; Nigh, Ronald (10 October 2014). "Reflexive Consumer Markets as Opportunities for New Peasant Farmers in Mexico and France: Constructing Food Sovereignty through Alternative Food Networks". Agroecology and Sustainable Food Systems. 39 (3): 317–341. doi:10.1080/21683565.2014.973545.
- Diemont, Stewart AW; Nigh, Ronald (August 2013). "The Maya Milpa: fire and the legacy of living soil". Frontiers in Ecology and the Environment. 11 (1): 45–54. doi:10.1890/120344.
