= Exploring Solutions Past: the Maya Forest Alliance =

American conservation nonprofit

- Founded: 2000
- Type: Non-profit Organization
- Purpose: Preserving the Maya forest as a cultural resource of global significance
- Location: Santa Barbara, California
- Region served: El Pilar
- Website: http://exploringsolutionspast.org/

Exploring Solutions Past: the Maya Forest Alliance is a nonprofit organization focused on preserving the Maya forest as a cultural resource for global significance. Exploring Solutions Past suggests that environmentally based indigenous practices might improve contemporary problems such as conservation and resource abundance. This organization combines the efforts of different fields and groups of people in order to promote a more sustainable future.

== Background ==
Exploring Solutions Past: the Maya Forest Alliance was founded in 2000 and is based in Santa Barbara, California. The organization’s president, Anabel Ford is known for discovering the ancient Maya site of El Pilar, where Exploring Solutions Past focuses its work. Although most of organization’s actions take place in El Pilar and its surrounding regions, Ford’s vision for the organization is to embrace sustainable traditional practices from different cultures all over the world.

Exploring Solutions Past suggests that the Maya did not practice ecologically destructive agriculture, but instead were forest gardeners. The forest was treated as a garden of food and medicine. If the Maya treated the forest well enough for their civilization to survive for such a long period of time, then it’s possible that their traditional practices could improve sustainability practices today. Forest gardens could be a major food and medicinal resource as well as a means to conserve biodiversity and water in the area.

Exploring Solutions Past conducts projects under three categories: Archaeology Under the Canopy, Forest Garden Education, and the Bi-National Peace Park Initiative. These three projects combine efforts of different groups of people, who bring in their knowledge to contribute to the project.

== Archaeology Under the Canopy ==
Archaeology Under the Canopy is a conservation strategy developed by Exploring Solutions Past president Anabel Ford. Ford suggests that forest surrounding ancient monuments serves as protection against destructive elements. Therefore, in order to conserve cultural history, the surrounding environment needs to be protected as well. This conservation strategy is used at El Pilar, which leads to a unique tourism experience. Visitors are able to see monuments within the context of its natural forest garden environment. Projects based on Archaeology Under the Canopy promote forest conservation in valuable ancient sites.

== Forest Garden Education ==
Education is one of the areas of focus for Exploring Solutions Past. Traditional forest gardening has survived by being passed down through generations. In order to promote sustainability on a much larger scale, forest gardeners have to pass their knowledge on to larger numbers of people. Exploring Solutions Past has teamed up with Maya farmers in the El Pilar Forest Garden Network to help spread the knowledge of traditional forest gardening.

Forest gardeners are able to further understand how their practices could benefit future generations and are seeing the importance of continuing their traditions. Ford and her team have also created a teacher’s guide for school teachers in the area to include forest gardening into their curriculum. Therefore, young students are able to understand the importance of forest gardening.

Exploring Solutions Past encourages the involvement of local communities not only to spread the goal of the organization, but to also improve the economic status of the local people. Anabel Ford's plans to increase the local interest in tourism and agriculture could benefit overall economic status of the regions surrounding El Pilar.

== Bi-National Peace Park Initiative ==
On October 21, 2008, a memorandum of understanding (MoU) was signed at the Santa Barbara Courthouse. This MoU established the Guatemalan government’s agreement to work with UCSB and the government of Belize to fund research and establish a peace park at El Pilar. El Pilar is located on the often disputed border between Belize and Guatemala. With the concerns for biodiversity and the increasing interest in tourism, both countries understood the significance of El Pilar. The potential benefits to both countries contributed to the establishment of El Pilar as the first binational peace park.
