= Angus Wright (academic) =

Environmental studies academic (1945-2022)

- Born: January 16, 1945; Salina, Kansas, U.S.
- Died: October 21, 2022 (aged 77)
- Spouse: Mary Mackey

Academic background
- Education: University of Michigan

Academic work
- Discipline: Environmental studies
- Institutions: California State University, Sacramento

Angus Lindsay Wright (Jan 16, 1945- Oct 21, 2022) was professor emeritus and one of the founders of the Environmental Studies program at California State University, Sacramento, where he taught from 1972 to 2005. (Wes Jackson was another of the founders.)

Wright earned his Ph.D. in Latin American History from the University of Michigan in 1976 with a dissertation on "Market, Land and Class: Southern Bahia, Brazil, 1890–1942." He conducted research in Mexico and Brazil with the support of Fulbright and Doherty Research grants.

Wright's first book was The Death of Ramon Gonzalez: The Modern Agricultural Dilemma (University of Texas Press, 1990). This book is available in an updated, second edition, published in 2005 by the University of Texas Press.

Wright is the co-author of To Inherit the Earth: The Landless Movement and the Struggle for a New Brazil, published in 2003 by Food First!. He joined ecologists Ivette Perfecto and John Vandermeer of the University of Michigan to write Nature's Matrix: Linking Conservation, Agriculture, and Food Sovereignty, published in 2009 by Earthscan Press of London, available in a second edition as of 2019. He also wrote numerous articles on environmental history and the social and environmental consequences of agriculture and of property ownership in the Americas.

Wright served as president and board member of the Pesticide Action Network North America and the Institute for Food and Development Policy (Food First) and was chairman of the Board of The Land Institute from 2009 to 2017, and a member of the Board from 1993 to 2019. As a member of the Investigative Mechanism (an independent citizen review board) of the Inter-American Development Bank, he coordinated a study of Latin America's largest hydroelectric plant, Yacyreta. He lectured frequently at universities around the United States. From 2005 through 2007 he served as a lead author on the International Assessment of Agricultural Knowledge, Science and Technology for Development, sponsored by the United Nations, the World Bank, and a variety of other institutions and organizations and now available in various forms from Island Press.

His wife Mary Mackey is a fellow CSU Sacramento academic, poet and novelist.
