= Julie Denslow =

American botanist, ecologist and biologist

Julie Sloan Denslow (born November 29, 1942, Coral Gables, Florida) is an American botanist, ecologist and biologist. She grew up in South Florida, and always loved nature. She graduated from Coral Gables Senior High School in 1960. She has contributed to the field of ecology through her work with and research of tropical ecosystems. Earlier in her career, she spent significant time in the field in tropical locations such as Costa Rica and Panama, as well as in temperate locations in Louisiana. Later in her career she worked more in the office and classroom, but still spent the occasional day in the field. She has focused on research involving the ecology of exotic invasive plant species, and on ecosystem reactions and recovery following disturbances. Denslow is also a strong supporter of gender equality in the natural sciences, pushing for equal representation of women involved in tropical research and leadership during a 2007 Gender Committee Meeting within the Association for Tropical Biology and Conservation (ATBC). Her most notable contribution to tropical research is her paper "Gap Partitioning among Tropical Rainforest Trees", published in 1980.

== Early life and education ==
=== Influences in early life ===
Denslow was influenced by the natural world from an early age. Growing up in South Florida, her family spent plenty of time outdoors. She grew up fishing and swimming with her parents and her cousins in the Everglades and the Florida Keys. Throughout her high school and college years, she assisted graduate students at the Virginia UM Marine Laboratory. While Denslow was studying at Oberlin College, Rachel Carson published Silent Spring, bringing to light the negative impacts that humans can have on the environment. She grew up knowing that she wanted to have a career focused on nature and conservation, but it was a pivotal experience during a 2-month field course on the fundamentals of tropical ecology in Costa Rica with the Organization for Tropical Studies that she found her passion for tropical ecosystems, and felt she could positively impact this field.

=== Education ===
1964 A.B. Zoology, Oberlin College, Oberlin, Ohio

1969 M.S. Biology, University of Miami, Coral Gables, Florida.

1978 Ph.D. Botany, University of Wisconsin, Madison, Wisconsin

== Career ==
=== Field work in Invasive Species Unit ===
Denslow worked for the United States Department of Agriculture Forest Service at the Institute for Pacific Islands Forestry as a research ecologist and team leader of the Invasive Species Unit from 1999 to 2007. While working there, she and a team of other scientists studied impacts on native forests in Hawaii, and other Pacific islands when exotic invasive plants were introduced, and used their findings to help advise land managers as well as the public on the effects that non-native plants can have on native ecosystems.

== Publications ==
=== Papers ===
==== Gap Partitioning among Tropical Rainforest Trees ====
Her long career as a scientist and educator allowed her to publish many papers, with the journal Biotropica containing 11 of her works. These 11 papers alone have been cited widely by other researchers, with over 700 citations in other papers. Her paper "Gap Partitioning among Tropical Rainforest Trees" alone accounts for a large percentage of these, and had been cited over 450 times as of 2016—making it the most cited paper in Biotropica's history. However, her paper on gap partitioning among tropical rainforest trees is her most notable contribution to the field of tropical ecology. It was published in 1980 in the journal Biotropica. This study focused on the gaps created in tropical rainforests when trees fall, and sought to answer how so many different species of trees can have reproductive success within these gaps. Denslow considered that depending on the severity of the tree fall, the gaps would be made larger or smaller. She suggested that rainforest trees adapted strategies to improve reproductive success by evolving specific traits that increase the rate of seedling success and recruitment in tree fall gaps of certain size ranges—some species may exploit smaller gaps, while others may exploit larger gaps. The size of the gaps affects many other factors in seedling success, such as the amount of light, humidity, and temperature. To test this, Denslow and her team planted seven species of shrubs around a forested area experiencing tree gaps in Costa Rica to test their growth rates. This 'partitioning' of the tree fall clearings encourages diversity and coexistence of rainforest tree species, because each species is best adapted to a specific microclimate.

==== Other Significant Research ====
- 1985 Denslow, J. S. Disturbance-mediated coexistence of species. pp. 307–323 In: S.T.A. Pickett and P. S. White (eds.) Ecology of Natural Disturbance and Patch Dynamics. Academic Press, Orlando, Florida.
- 1987 Denslow, J. S. Tropical Treefall Gaps and Tree Species Diversity. Ann. Rev. Ecol. Syst. 18: 431–451.
- 1990 Denslow, J. S., J. Schultz, P. M. Vitousek, B. Strain. Growth responses of tropical shrubs to treefall gap environments. Ecology 71:165-179.
- 1990 J. S. Denslow and A. E. Gomez D. Seed rain to treefall gaps in a neotropical rain forest. Can. J. Forest Research 20:642-648.
- 1996 Chazdon, R. L., R. K. Colwell, J. S. Denslow, and M. Guariguata. Statistical methods for estimating species richness in primary and secondary rain forests of NE Costa Rica. In: Measuring and Monitoring Forest Biological Diversity: The International Network of Biodiversity Plots, Smithsonian Institution Press, In press.

=== Thesis ===
1978 J. S. Denslow. Secondary succession in a Colombian rainforest: Strategies of species response across a disturbance gradient. Ph.D. Thesis, University of Wisconsin-Madison

=== Book ===
1988 J. S. Denslow and C. Padoch (eds.) People of the Tropical Rain Forest. U. of California Press, Berkeley and Los Angeles, 225 pp.

== Recognitions ==
=== Julie S. Denslow Prize ===
The tropical ecology journal Biotropica has recognized Denslow's research contributions to the field by instating the Julie S. Denslow Prize in 2015. Previously called the Award for Excellence in Tropical Biology and Conservation, since 2000 it has been awarded each year to a researcher who has published an outstanding paper in the journal during the previous calendar year. Recipients are determined based on papers that are presented clearly, with a well thought out design, that allow for new insights into factors influencing the various processes in tropical ecosystems.
