= Robert Colwell =

Robert Colwell may refer to:

- Bob Colwell (born 1954), American electrical engineer and computer designer
- Robert K. Colwell (born 1943), American evolutionary ecologist, biogeographer, and biodiversity scientist
