= Killer at Large =

Killer at Large may refer to:

- Killer at Large (1936 film), American mystery film directed by David Selman
- Killer at Large (1947 film), American crime film directed by William Beaudine
