= Stacy Philpott =

American ecologist and academic

- Education: University of Michigan; University of Washington
- Scientific career
- Workplaces: University of California, Santa Cruz; National Zoological Park
- Thesis: The diversity, ecology, and function of arboreal ants in coffee agroecosystems in Soconusco, Chiapas, Mexico (2004)
- Website: Philpott Lab

Stacy Philpott is an American ecologist who is a professor at the University of California, Santa Cruz. Her research considers agroecology and the conservation of biodiversity. She was elected a Fellow of the Ecological Society of America in 2021.

== Early life and education ==
Philpott studied science at the University of Washington. She moved to the University of Michigan for doctoral research, where she studied ecology and evolutionary biology. She joined the Ecological Society of America as a student in 2000. Her doctoral research considered the diversity and ecology of coffee agroecosystems. Philpott spent two years as a postdoctoral fellow at the National Zoological Park.

== Research and career ==
Philpott started her independent scientific career at the University of Toledo. In 2012, Philpott joined the faculty at the University of California, Santa Cruz. Her research considers insect ecology and the relationships between biodiversity and ecosystem status.

Philpott makes use of urban community gardens to understand ecological relationships. She studies the agroecosystems in 25 gardens across the coastline of California. At the same time, Philpott investigates coffee agro-forestry and the role of ants as a form of pest control in agro-forestry systems. She has studied the biodiversity of dung beetles, and the benefits they provide to ecosystems.

Philpott was elected Fellow of the Ecological Society of America in 2021.

== Selected publications ==
- Robin L. Chazdon; Celia A. Harvey; Oliver Komar; et al. (March 2009). "Beyond Reserves: A Research Agenda for Conserving Biodiversity in Human-modified Tropical Landscapes". Biotropica. 41 (2): 142–153. doi:10.1111/j.1744-7429.2008.00471.x. ISSN 0006-3606. Wikidata Q58709947.
- Brenda B. Lin; Stacy M. Philpott; Shalene Jha (May 2015). "The future of urban agriculture and biodiversity-ecosystem services: Challenges and next steps". Basic and Applied Ecology. 16 (3): 189–201. doi:10.1016/j.baae.2015.01.005. ISSN 1439-1791. Wikidata Q58709747.
- Stacy M Philpott; Wayne J Arendt; Inge Armbrecht; et al. (1 October 2008). "Biodiversity loss in Latin American coffee landscapes: review of the evidence on ants, birds, and trees". Conservation Biology. 22 (5): 1093–1105. doi:10.1111/j.1523-1739.2008.01029.x. ISSN 0888-8892. PMID 18759777. Wikidata Q33365191.
