= Denslow (surname) =

W. W. Denslow (1856–1915) was an American illustrator and caricaturist.

Denslow may also refer to:

- Dorothea H. Denslow (1900–1971), American sculptor, educator
- Julie Denslow (born 1942), American botanist and biologist
- Ray Denslow (1885–1960), American historian
