= Robert K. Colwell =

American evolutionary ecologist and biogeographer

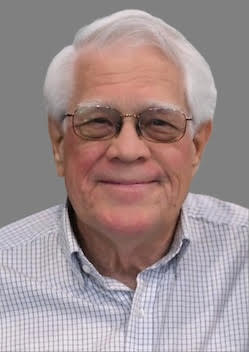
- Born: October 9, 1943 (age 83); Denver, Colorado
- Education: Harvard University (BA, 1965); University of Michigan (PhD, 1969)
- Known for: Biogeographical null models; mid-domain effect; biodiversity statistics and informatics; climate-driven range shifts; hummingbird flower mites
- Spouse: Mary-Claire King (m. 1973; div. 1983) Robin Chazdon (m. 1985)
- Awards: Fellow, American Academy of Arts and Sciences (2011); President, American Society of Naturalists (1998); Vice-President, Ecological Society of America (1994–1995); Distinguished Research Professor, University of Connecticut
- Scientific career
- Workplaces: University of California, Berkeley (1970–1989); University of Connecticut (1989–2014); University of Colorado Museum of Natural History
- Thesis: Ecological specialization and species diversity of tropical and temperate arthropods
- Doctoral advisor: Lawrence B. Slobodkin
- Website: www.robertkcolwell.org

Robert K. Colwell is an American evolutionary ecologist, biogeographer, biodiversity scientist, and tropical biologist. He is Board of Trustees Distinguished Professor Emeritus in the Department of Ecology and Evolutionary Biology at the University of Connecticut and Museum Curator Adjoint in Entomology and Zoology at the University of Colorado Museum of Natural History. An expert in biodiversity statistics, Colwell is a developer of methods for estimating species richness from incomplete data and is best known for the mid-domain effect and for inventing and developing widely-used software tools in biodiversity informatics.

== Early life and education ==
Colwell is the younger of two children of Robert Pulliam Colwell, a public-school principal and rancher, and Eleanor Knight Colwell, a concert flutist and amateur naturalist. He attended public schools in Denver, but his interest in biology was kindled by weekends and summers on the family cattle ranch in the mountains. Colwell was married to writer and poet Mary Mackey from 1965 to 1972. He subsequently married geneticist Mary-Claire King in 1973; the marriage ended in 1983. In 1985, he married Robin Chazdon

In 1965, Colwell received a Bachelor of Arts (AB) degree from Harvard University. In 1966, he worked as a curatorial assistant in ethnobotany under Richard Evans Schultes at Harvard. In 1969, he received his Ph.D. in Ecology from the University of Michigan under the supervision of Lawrence Slobodkin. He was a Ford Foundation Fellow at the University of Chicago from 1969 to 1970, working with Monte Lloyd and Richard Levins.

== Career ==
Colwell served on the faculty of the Department of Zoology at the University of California, Berkeley from 1970 to 1989. In 1989, he joined the faculty of the Department of Ecology and Evolutionary Biology at the University of Connecticut, where he was named a Board of Trustees Distinguished Professor in 2001. After retiring from teaching in 2014, he became a Distinguished Research Professor at the University of Connecticut. He also holds a position as Curator Adjoint of Entomology and Zoology at the University of Colorado Museum of Natural History. Since 2010, he has been an International Collaborator at the Center for Macroecology, Evolution and Climate at the University of Copenhagen, and from 2014 to 2025 he was Professor e Pesquisador Visitante Especial, Universidade Federal de Goiás, Brazil.

== Other professional work ==
Colwell served on the Board of Reviewing Editors of the journal Science from 2002 to 2005. He has been Editor-in-Chief for Reviews and Syntheses for the journal Ecography since 2014 and has served in various editorial roles for other journals. He was also an Associate Editor for the Encyclopedia of Biodiversity between 1999 and 2012.

In the 1980s and 1990s, Colwell advised several public agencies, including the U.S. Environmental Protection Agency (EPA), the National Institutes of Health (NIH), the United States Department of Agriculture (USDA), and the Organisation for Economic Co-operation and Development (OECD). His work during this period focused on the environmental, ecological, and evolutionary risks associated with genetically engineered organisms.

== Research ==
The central theme of Colwell's research is biological diversity, from the coexistence and coevolution of species within ecological communities to the origin, diversification, and evolutionary adaptation of species across geographical and geological timescales. His work has contributed to advances in process-based simulation of biogeography, global-change biogeography, biodiversity statistics, biodiversity inventory, and biodiversity informatics.

=== Key areas of contribution ===
- Biogeographical null models. With co-author David Winkler, Colwell developed one of the first biogeographical null models incorporating simulated evolutionary diversification and stochastic dispersal.
- The mid-domain effect (MDE). With George Hurtt, Colwell demonstrated that species diversity may peak in the center of bounded geographical domains when species ranges are randomly distributed.
- Biodiversity statistics. Colwell collaborated extensively with Jonathan Coddington, Anne Chao, and Nicholas Gotelli to develop statistical methods for estimating species richness from sampling data.
- Biodiversity informatics. He co-directed Project ALAS, a long-term tropical arthropod diversity inventory in Costa Rica and developed the biodiversity database software Biota.
- Climate-driven range shifts. In 2008, Colwell and colleagues published research predicting upslope range shifts of tropical species under climate warming and lowland biotic attrition.
- Hummingbird flower mites. Colwell conducted research on mites that live in hummingbird-pollinated flowers, compete with hummingbirds for nectar, and disperse between plants in the nostrils of the birds, contributing to knowledge of coevolution, sexual selection for host fidelity, and community ecology.

== Selected publications ==
- Chao, Anne; Chazdon, Robin L.; Colwell, Robert K.; Shen, Tsung-Jen (2005). "A new statistical approach for assessing similarity of species composition with incidence and abundance data". Ecology Letters. 8 (2): 148–159. Bibcode:2005EcolL...8..148C. doi:10.1111/j.1461-0248.2004.00707.x.
- Chao, Anne; Gotelli, Nicholas J.; Hsieh, Tracy C.; Sander, Elizabeth L.; Ma, K. H.; Colwell, Robert K.; Ellison, Aaron M. (2014). "Rarefaction and extrapolation with Hill numbers: a framework for sampling and estimation in species diversity studies". Ecological Monographs. 84 (1): 45–67. Bibcode:2014EcoM...84...45C. doi:10.1890/13-0133.1.
- Colwell, Robert K. (2012). "EstimateS: Statistical estimation of species richness and shared species from samples". Persistent URL (OCLC).
- Colwell, Robert K.; Coddington, Jonathan A. (1994). "Estimating terrestrial biodiversity through extrapolation". Philosophical Transactions of the Royal Society of London. Series B: Biological Sciences. 345 (1311): 101–118. doi:10.1098/rstb.1994.0091. hdl:10088/4441. PMID 7972351.
- Colwell, Robert K.; Futuyma, Douglas J. (1971). "On the measurement of niche breadth and overlap". Ecology. 52 (4): 567–576. Bibcode:1971Ecol...52..567C. doi:10.2307/1934144. JSTOR 1934144. PMID 28973805.
- Colwell, Robert K.; Hurtt, George C. (1994). "Nonbiological gradients in species richness and a spurious Rapoport effect". The American Naturalist. 144 (4): 570–595. Bibcode:1994ANat..144..570C. doi:10.1086/285695.
- Colwell, Robert K.; Lees, David C. (2000). "The mid-domain effect: geometric constraints on the geography of species richness". Trends in Ecology & Evolution. 15 (2): 70–76. doi:10.1016/S0169-5347(99)01767-X.
- Colwell, Robert K.; Mao, Chang Xuan; Chang, Jing (2004). "Interpolating, extrapolating, and comparing incidence-based species accumulation curves". Ecology. 85 (10): 2717–2727. Bibcode:2004Ecol...85.2717C. doi:10.1890/03-0557.
- Colwell, Robert K.; Brehm, Gunnar; Cardelús, Catherine L.; Gilman, Alex C.; Longino, John T. (2008). "Global warming, elevational range shifts, and lowland biotic attrition in the wet tropics". Science. 322 (5899): 258–261. Bibcode:2008Sci...322..258C. doi:10.1126/science.1162547.
- Gotelli, Nicholas J.; Colwell, Robert K. (2001). "Quantifying biodiversity: procedures and pitfalls in the measurement and comparison of species richness". Ecology Letters. 4 (4): 379–391. Bibcode:2001EcolL...4..379G. doi:10.1046/j.1461-0248.2001.00230.x.

== Honors and awards ==
Colwell has received numerous professional honors. He served as President of the American Society of Naturalists in 1998 and received the President's Award from the society in 2001. He was Vice President of the Ecological Society of America from 1994 to 1995 and received the ESA Distinguished Service Award in 1999. He was elected Fellow of the Ecological Society of America in 2012.

He is also a Fellow of the American Association for the Advancement of Science, the California Academy of Sciences, and the Connecticut Academy of Science and Engineering. In 2011 he was elected to the American Academy of Arts and Sciences. In 2018 and 2025, he was named a Clarivate Highly Cited Researcher.

The mite species Tropicoseius (Rhinoseius) colwelli Hunter 1972, the katydid species Acantheremus colwelli Naskrecki 1997 (Colwell's Horned Katydid), and the ant species Lenomyrmex colwelli Longino 2006 were named to honor Colwell.
