= Strange Triangle =

1946 film by Ray McCarey

- Theatrical release poster
- Directed by: Ray McCarey
- Screenplay by: Mortimer Braus; Adaptation: Charles G. Booth
- Story by: Jack Andrews
- Produced by: Aubrey Schenck
- Starring: Signe Hasso; Preston Foster; Anabel Shaw
- Cinematography: Harry Jackson
- Edited by: Norman Colbert
- Music by: David Buttolph
- Production company: 20th Century-Fox
- Distributed by: 20th Century-Fox
- Release date: May 17, 1946 (United States)
- Running time: 65 minutes
- Country: United States
- Language: English

Strange Triangle is a 1946 American crime film noir directed by Ray McCarey and starring Signe Hasso, Preston Foster and Anabel Shaw.

== Plot ==
A bank examiner becomes involved with a couple planning embezzlement, which leads them to murder.

== Cast ==
- Signe Hasso as Francine Huber a.k.a. Mathews
- Preston Foster as Sam Crane
- Anabel Shaw as Betty Wilson
- Shepperd Strudwick as Earl Huber a.k.a. Mathews
- Roy Roberts as Harry Matthews
- Emory Parnell as Barney Shaefer
- Nancy Evans as Hilda Shaefer
