= Mary-Claire King =

American geneticist

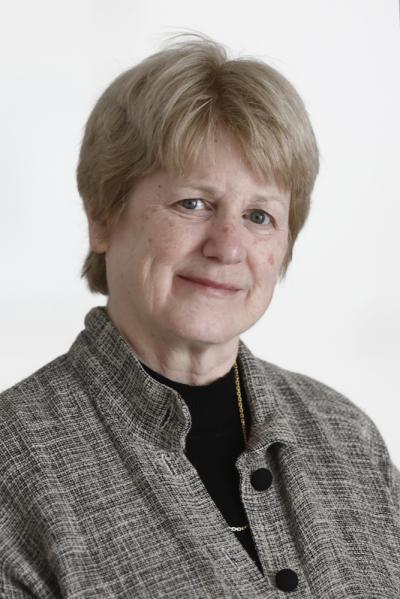
- 2013 portrait, by Uwe Dettmar / Paul-Ehrlich-Stiftung
- Born: February 27, 1946 (age 80); Illinois, United States
- Education: Carleton College (BS); University of California, Berkeley (PhD)
- Known for: Breast cancer gene discovery Forensic genetics for human rights
- Spouse: Robert K. Colwell (m. 1973; div. 1983)
- Children: 1
- Awards: Gruber Prize in Genetics (2004); Heineken Prize (2006); Weizmann Award (2006); Pearl Meister Greengard Prize (2010); Lasker Award (2014); National Medal of Science (2014, awarded 2016); Shaw Prize in Medicine (2018); Princess of Asturias Award (2025)
- Scientific career
- Fields: Human genetics
- Workplaces: University of Washington, University of California, Berkeley
- Thesis: Protein polymorphisms in chimpanzee and human evolution (1973)
- Doctoral advisor: Allan Wilson
- Website: UW Genome Sciences page

External videos
- "Meet Dr. Mary-Claire King, Ground-Breaking Geneticist and Tireless Human Rights Activist", World Science Festival, March 5, 2014
- "The Moth Presents Dr. Mary-Claire King at the World Science Festival", The Moth at the World Science Festival, June 27, 2014

Mary-Claire King (born February 27, 1946) is an American geneticist. She was the first to show that breast cancer can be inherited due to mutations in the gene she called BRCA1. She studies human genetics and is particularly interested in genetic heterogeneity and complex traits. She studies the interaction of genetics and environmental influences and their effects on human conditions such as breast and ovarian cancer, inherited deafness, schizophrenia, HIV, systemic lupus erythematosus and rheumatoid arthritis. She has been the American Cancer Society Professor of the Department of Genome Sciences and of Medical Genetics at the University of Washington School of Medicine since 1995.

Besides known for her accomplishment in identifying breast cancer genes, King is also known for demonstrating that humans and chimpanzees are 99% genetically identical and for applying genomic sequencing to identify victims of human rights abuses. In 1984, in Argentina, she began working in identifying children who had been stolen from their families and adopted illegally under the military dictatorship during the Dirty War (1976–1983). She has received many awards, including the Lasker Award and the National Medal of Science. In 2002, Discover magazine recognized King as one of the 50 most important women in science.

== Early life ==
Mary-Claire King was born on February 27, 1946, to Harvey and Clarice King of Wilmette, Illinois, near Chicago. Her father worked for Standard Oil of Indiana. When King was 15 years old, her childhood best friend died of cancer. King became interested in science in the hope of learning enough to prevent and treat such illnesses.

== Education ==
King received her undergraduate degree in mathematics (cum laude) from Carleton College, Phi Beta Kappa, in 1967.

King was accepted into the graduate program at the University of California, Berkeley, and soon became politically active. She helped to organize protests against U.S. involvement in the Vietnam War in 1970. She says: "The single most effective thing we did was on the day after the US invaded Cambodia, we got out our suit jackets and shirtwaist dresses – not clothes that any of us had worn since coming to Berkeley – and went to the synagogues and churches and by the end of Sunday we had 30,000 letters opposing the action." She dropped out of university briefly after the National Guard was sent in against student protestors.

She spent a year doing consumer advocacy work for Ralph Nader, investigating pesticide use and its effects on farm workers.

After her return to Berkeley, advisor Allan Wilson persuaded her to switch from mathematics to genetics. King had been introduced to genetics by professor Curt Stern, in the last class he taught before his retirement. In her doctoral work at Berkeley, King demonstrated through comparative protein analysis that chimpanzees and humans were 99% genetically identical. King's work supported Allan Wilson's view that chimpanzees and humans diverged only five million years ago, and King and Wilson suggested that gene regulation was likely responsible for the significant differences between the species. King completed her thesis in 1972, and received her doctorate in genetics from the University of California, Berkeley in 1973.

Next King went to Santiago, Chile to teach at the Universidad de Chile as part of a University of California-University of Chile exchange program. Her time there was cut short when the Chilean government of Salvador Allende was overthrown in a CIA-backed military coup on September 11, 1973. King and her husband Robert Colwell returned to Berkeley in late December. She later learned that a number of her colleagues and students had either disappeared or been killed.

King accepted a postdoctoral position at the University of California, San Francisco (UCSF), to work with Nicholas L. Petrakis. As of January 1, 1974, King began to work on the problem of why breast cancer tends to appear in families.

== Family ==
King's younger brother Paul King, a mathematician and business consultant, was the CEO of Vanalco in Vancouver, Washington.

King married ecologist Robert K. Colwell in 1973. They have one child. King and Colwell divorced in 1983.

== Career ==
King accepted a faculty appointment at the University of California, Berkeley, as professor of genetics and epidemiology in 1976. She remained at UC Berkeley until 1995, when she accepted an appointment as the American Cancer Society Professor at the University of Washington. She also served on the Life Sciences jury for the Infosys Prize in 2015.

== Research ==
=== Breast cancer ===
From 1974 to 1990, King carried out years of painstaking research, seeking a genetic marker, an identifiable piece of genetic material, that tended to accompany the presence of breast cancer in families. For much of that time, the predominant theory was that cancer was viral. Most scientists disregarded or attacked her ideas. The idea that genetic patterns could be linked to the incidence of complex diseases was considered an unlikely long shot. Genetics had been recognized as significant in diseases with a simple genetic tie, such as Huntington's disease, cystic fibrosis, and sickle-cell anemia, but researchers were skeptical about the usefulness of genetics in studying more common and complex diseases involving both multiple genetic factors and environmental influences. King sometimes worried that she was going down a blind alley in trying to study the interplay of genetics with a complex human disease.

Nonetheless, the search for the breast cancer susceptibility gene was moving forward with firm steps in King's lab and accelerating in the mid-1980s. On the basis of a series of unselected breast cancer cases and their family history, in 1988, King's team published a genetic epidemiological model for breast cancer, demonstrating the theoretical existence of a major dominant gene that conferred a high degree of susceptibility to breast cancer in a subset of the population. Applying this genetic penetrance model and using the genotyping technology available at the time, King's team evaluated more than 170 genetic markers, utilizing the gene mapping technique known as linkage analysis. When they in 1990 finally found a genetic marker that showed strong evidence in a subset of families, King's group demonstrated that a single gene on chromosome 17 could be linked to many breast and ovarian cancers, and that genetic heterogeneity was present in breast cancer etiology. A team member suggested that they reorganize their data by age of onset, as in the study cohort, the families in which members had developed cancer at a relatively young age tended to show stronger evidence of linkage to this locus. The idea was that early cases might be more likely to reflect a genetic component, in contrast to sporadic mutations that might occur at any age or even accrue over time. As many as 5–10% of all cases of breast cancer may be hereditary. In 1991 King officially named the gene BRCA1. Her discovery paved the way for identification of the gene sequence. In September 1994, Myriad Genetics published a paper on the positional cloning of the sequence after a highly publicized "race" by groups of scientists. In December 1994, King and her collaborators published results based on a second cohort of families. A second gene, BRCA2, was also found. These two genes, BRCA1 and BRCA2, work to clean up cells in the body that have been harmed by things such as tobacco or just help clean the cells because they have aged. When these genes do not perform these functions, cells will grow and divide quickly, leading to some types of cancers. Both genes worked to suppress the development of cancer tumors, but certain types of genetic mutations could prevent them from doing so.

In 1996, with support from the Breast Cancer Research Foundation (BCRF) Mary-Claire King and social worker Joan Marks began the New York Breast Cancer Study, which definitively determined that incidence of breast and ovarian cancer was linked to inherited mutations of the genes BRCA1 and BRCA2. The researchers studied women of Ashkenazi Jewish ancestry in New York, a group that was known to have a very high incidence of breast cancer (up to an 80% risk by age 70, compared with 12% in the general population). She has also studied the incidence of breast cancer in Palestinian women.

The discovery of the "breast cancer gene" revolutionized the study of numerous other diseases and phenotypes. The model and technique King developed to identify BRCA1 has since proven valuable in the study of many other illnesses and conditions. King's contributions have made it possible for people to be informed of genetic information that then can aid them in making choices best for themselves and for their future.

King also worked on a project studying the mutations of genes linked to breast cancer inheritance in Nigerian women between March 1998 and 2014. King's team decided to do this research on the grounds that more people die in Nigeria from triple negative breast cancer that is diagnosed at a later stage than other, more educated regions of the world, such as Europe or America. At the finish of this study, King's team was still unsure of the reason for such high levels of Triple-negative breast cancer, since many of the people diagnosed were not showing mutations in the BRCA1 gene. Her study supported the idea that genomic sequencing could be useful as a tool to help detect gene mutations early and be proactive in letting those who have high risks for breast cancer know ahead of time.

=== Hearing loss and deafness ===
Since 1990, King has been working in collaboration with scientists around the world to identify genetic causes of hearing loss and deafness. They localized the first nonsyndromic deafness-related gene, DFNA1, in a Costa Rica kindred, and successfully cloned the gene in 1999.

King continues to work with scientists Karen Avraham at Tel Aviv University in Israel and Moien Kanaan at Bethlehem University in Palestine, modeling international scientific cooperation in conjunction with conducting scientific research. Hereditary deafness is common among some Palestinian and Israeli communities, providing good study populations to understand the genetics of this condition.

We understand that working together transcends politics. It's possible to do beautiful useful science together, even between countries that are in conflict.

— Mary-Claire King, 2018

The genetic etiology of hearing loss is extremely heterogeneous, with a very high degree of complexity among Middle Eastern populations, presenting a different level of challenge for genetic analysis. King's collaboration with scientists in Israel and Palestine has resolved the complex web of different genes and varying modes of transmission for this common phenotype among many kindreds in the communities in that region.

=== Schizophrenia ===
King in recent years has developed a deep interest in studying the genetic factors influencing schizophrenia. In collaboration with other scientists including Judith L. Rapoport, Jonathan Sebat, and Deborah L. Levy, she has discovered evidence that suggests that schizophrenia may be linked to the presence of genetic mutations called copy number variations (CNVs) in pathways involved in neural development. A percentage of such variations may occur spontaneously as a result of copying errors in cells.

=== Human Genome Diversity Project ===
King has also worked on the Human Genome Diversity Project, led by Luca Cavalli-Sforza. The project seeks to delineate the distinctions among individuals in order to further understanding of human evolution and historical migrations.

=== Romanov exhumation ===
King is well known for her work on the forensic determination of individual identity, in particular the use of mitochondrial DNA from teeth. King was invited to participate in DNA investigations of the first analysis of Romanov remains exhumed in 1991 in Ekaterinburg, Russia.

== Human rights work ==
King first applied her genetics skills to human rights work in 1984, when she and her lab began working with Abuelas de Plaza de Mayo (Grandmothers of Plaza de Mayo) in Argentina. She used dental genetics to identify missing persons, ultimately identifying 59 children and helping return them to their biological families. Most had been born to women in prison who had been persecuted as political dissidents and were later "disappeared" by the Argentine military dictatorship during the eight-year "Dirty War" from 1976 to 1983. These children were often illegally "adopted" by military families without their mother's or other family consent.

Beginning in 1977 Las Abuelas ("the grandmothers") had gathered to protest the disappearance of their grandchildren and seek their return. Every Thursday, they marched to the central plaza in Buenos Aires ("Plaza de Mayo") to demand the return of their grandchildren, and they began gathering data trying to identify the many missing children (estimated to be 400–500).

By the time King joined the project, the dictatorship had been replaced by a democratic government, but it required proof of kinship to remove children from families and return them to biological families. King's technique, using mitochondrial DNA and human leukocyte antigen serotyping genetic markers from dental samples, proved invaluable. The Supreme Court of Argentina in 1984 determined that King's test had positively identified the relationship of Paula Logares to her family, establishing the precedent for the ultimate reunification of dozens of families with their stolen children.

Since 1984, this technique has become a major method for genetic identification of the deceased as well as the living. In 1993 King used the technique to identify the remains of individuals massacred in the village of El Mozote, El Salvador. More than 750 adults and children were massacred and buried in mass graves by US-trained Salvadoran soldiers of the Atlácatl Battalion.

King has worked with numerous human rights organizations, such as Physicians for Human Rights and Amnesty International, to identify missing people in countries including Argentina, Chile, El Salvador, Guatemala, Haiti, Honduras, Mexico, Rwanda, the Balkans (Croatia and Serbia), and the Philippines. King's lab has also provided DNA identification for the U.S. Army, the United Nations, and the U.N.'s war crimes tribunals.

King has been highly critical of genetic patenting, a practice which was ruled against by the U.S. Supreme Court in 2013, on the grounds that "genes are natural products and cannot be patented".

== Awards, prizes, and honors ==
Dr. King has won numerous awards, prizes, and honors for her scientific and humanitarian work, including:.

- 2025, Woman Innovator of VinFuture Prize
- 2025, Princess of Asturias Award
- 2025, National Academy of Sciences Public Welfare Medal
- 2021, Canada Gairdner International Award.
- 2020, William Allan Award, American Society of Human Genetics (ASHG)
- 2018, Mendel Medal
- 2018, Advocacy Award, American Society of Human Genetics (ASHG)
- 2018, Shaw Prize in Medicine, China
- 2018, Dan David Prize, Israel
- 2018, Benjamin Franklin Medal for Distinguished Achievement in the Sciences
- 2017, TNQ Distinguished Lectures in the Life Sciences, Seventh Annual Cell Press-TNQ India Distinguished Lectureship Series
- 2016, National Medal of Science (awarded in 2014, announced in 2015)
- 2016, TUBA Academy Prize in Health and Life Sciences, TÜBA – Turkish Academy of Sciences
- 2014, HudsonAlpha Life Sciences Prize
- 2014, Lasker~Koshland Special Achievement Award in Medical Science
- 2013, Paul Ehrlich and Ludwig Darmstaedter Prize
- 2012, member, American Philosophical Society
- 2010, CSHL Double Helix Medal Honoree
- 2006, Dr A.H. Heineken Prize for Medicine
- 2006, Weizmann Women & Science Award, Weizmann Institute of Science
- 2005, member, National Academy of Sciences
- 2005, Association for Molecular Pathology, Award for Excellence in Molecular Diagnostics
- 2004, Gruber Prize in Genetics, Gruber Foundation
- 1999, Basic Science Award, Brinker International Awards for Breast Cancer Research, Susan G. Komen for the Cure
- 1996, inaugural Jill Rose Award, The Breast Cancer Research Foundation
- 1994, Institute of Medicine (now National Academy of Medicine)
- 1994, G. H. A. Clowes Award, American Association for Cancer Research (AACR) & Eli Lilly and Company
- 1993, Fellow, AAAS
- 1993, Woman of the Year, Glamour Magazine
- 1993, Golden Plate Award of the American Academy of Achievement
- 1992, Susan G. Komen Foundation Award for Distinguished Achievement in Breast Cancer, Susan G. Komen for the Cure

=== Honorary degrees ===
- 2026, Doctor of Science honoris causa, New York University
- 2023, Doctor of Science honoris causa, Universidad de Buenos Aires
- 2019, Doctor of Science, Williams College
- 2018, Doctor of Science, University of British Columbia
- 2016, Doctor of Science honoris causa, The University of Hong Kong
- 2010, Pearl Meister Greengard Prize, Rockefeller University
- 2008, Tel Aviv University
- 2008, Princeton University
- 2007, Yale University
- 2006, Katholieke Universiteit Leuven
- 2005, Brown University
- 2003, Doctor of Science honoris causa, Columbia University
- 2003, Doctor of Science honoris causa, Harvard University;
- 1995, Doctor of Science, Bard College
- 1994, Smith College
- 1992, Carleton College

=== Notable professional service ===
- Robert Wood Johnson Foundation's Minority Medical Faculty Development Program, Scientific Advisory Board
- United Nations War Crimes Tribunal for the Former Yugoslavia (ICTY)
- United Nations Forensic Anthropology Team
- National Cancer Institute's Breast Cancer Task Force
- National Institutes of Health Genome Study Section
- Office of Research on Women's Health Advisory Board

King has five patents and over 250 peer-reviewed journal articles.
