= Mary Mackey =

American novelist, poet and academic (born 1945)

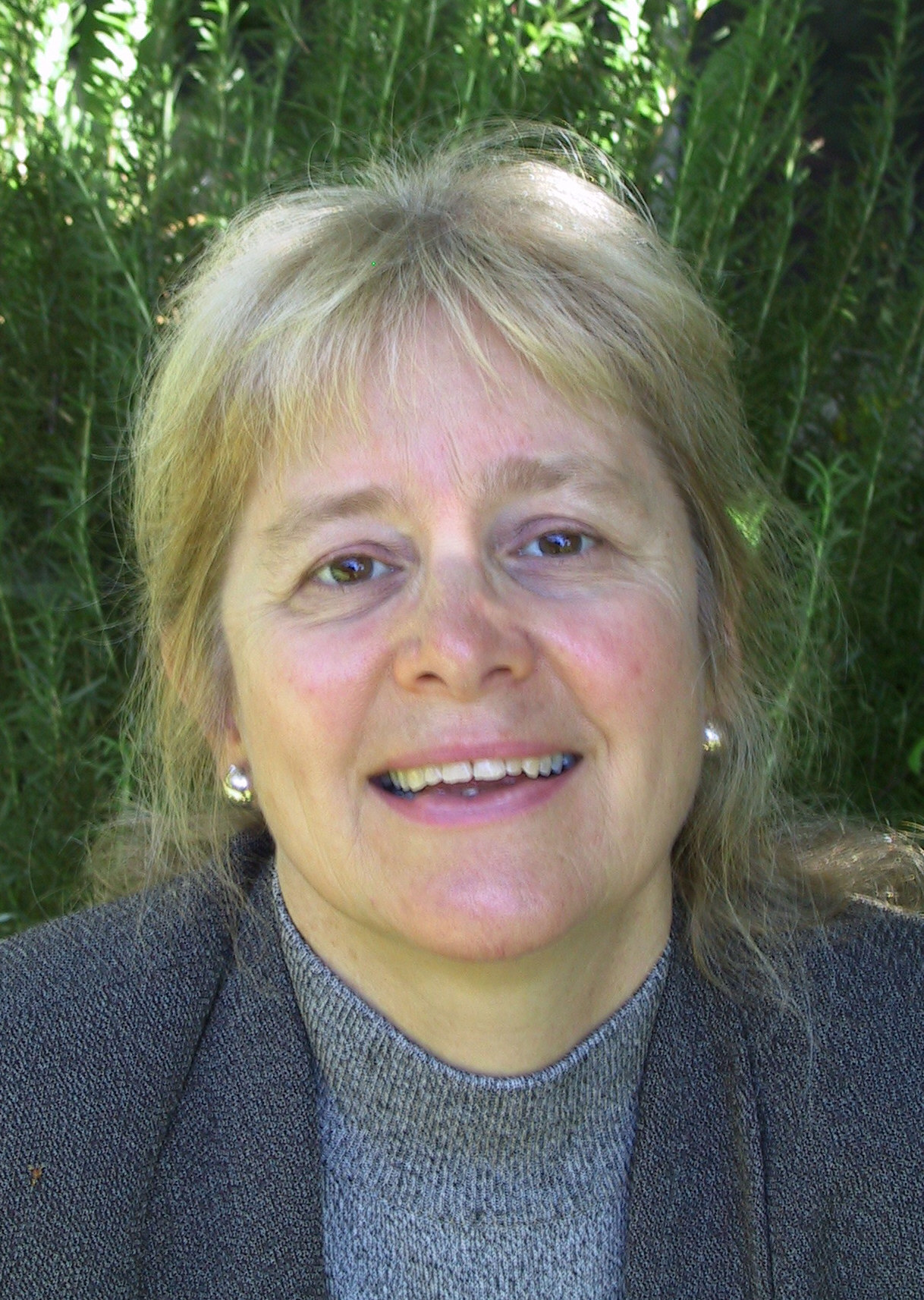
- Born: 1945 (age 80–81); Indianapolis, Indiana, U.S.
- Education: Harvard College (BA); University of Michigan (PhD)
- Occupations: Poet; Novelist
- Spouse: Robert K. Colwell (m. 1965; div. 1972) Angus Wright
- Mackey's voice recorded July 2014
- Website: www.marymackey.com

Mary Lou Mackey (born 1945) is an American novelist, poet, and academic. She is the author of eight collections of poetry and fourteen novels, including A Grand Passion and The Village of Bones, The Year The Horses Came, The Horses At The Gate, and The Fires of Spring, four sweeping historical novels that take as their subject the earth-centered, Goddess-worshiping cultures of Neolithic Europe. In 2012, her sixth collection of poetry, Sugar Zone, won a PEN Oakland/Josephine Miles Literary Award. Another collection, The Jaguars That Prowl Our Dreams: New and Selected Poems 1974 to 2018, won a 2018 Women’s Spirituality Book Award from the California Institute of Integral Studies; and the 2019 Eric Hoffer Small Press Award for the best book published by a small press. Her first novel, Immersion (Shameless Hussy Press, 1972), was the first novel published by a Second Wave feminist press. Long concerned with environmental issues, Mackey frequently writes about the rainforests of Costa Rica and the Brazilian Amazon. In the early 1970s, as Professor of English and Writer-In-Residence at California State University, Sacramento, she was instrumental in the founding of the CSUS Women's Studies Program and the CSUS English Department Graduate Creative Writing Program. From 1989 to 1992, she served as President of the West Coast Branch of PEN American Center involving herself in PEN's international defense of persecuted writers.

== Biography ==
Mary Mackey was born in Indianapolis, Indiana. Her father was a physician. Her mother worked as a chemist in the Mead Johnson laboratories during World War II. Mackey graduated from Harvard College magna cum laude with a major in English. While there, she came under the influence of the father of modern ethnobotany, Richard Evans Schultes, to whom she attributes a lifelong interest in botany and ecology, themes which often appear in her novels and poetry. (Note: See also Mackey’s novels Immersion, The Last Warrior Queen, and The Widow’s War; and her poetry collections Breaking The Fever and Sugar Zone.) During her twenties, she lived in field stations in the then-remote jungles of Costa Rica. After receiving her Ph.D. in Comparative Literature from the University of Michigan, she moved to California to become Professor of English and Writer-in-Residence at California State University, Sacramento (CSUS). She was married to Robert K. Colwell in 1965 until they divorced in 1972. Her other marriage was to Angus Wright, CSUS Emeritus Professor of Environmental Studies, with whom she frequently traveled to Brazil until his death in 2022.

Mackey was one of the founders of the CSUS Women's Studies Program. She also founded the CSUS English Department Graduate Creative Writing Program along with poet Dennis Schmitz and novelist Richard Bankowsky. In 1978 Mackey founded The Feminist Writers' Guild with poets Adrienne Rich and Susan Griffin, author Charlene Spretnak, and novelist Valerie Miner. From 1989 to 1992, Mackey served as President of the West Coast Branch of PEN American Center involving herself in PEN's international defense of persecuted writers. Mackey retired from California State University in 2008. As of 2020, she continues to write novels and poetry.

== Works ==
Mackey is the author of fourteen novels and eight collections of poetry. She is noted for her historical fiction, particularly for The Village of Bones, The Year The Horses Came, The Horses At The Gate, and The Fires of Spring, a series set in Neolithic Europe which Mackey based on the research of archaeologist Marija Gimbutas. She is also noted for her lyric poetry which has been praised by Wendell Berry, Jane Hirshfield, Maxine Hong Kingston, Dennis Nurkse, Ron Hansen, Dennis Schmitz, and Marge Piercy for its beauty, precision, originality, and extraordinary range.

Her first novel, Immersion (Shameless Hussy Press, 1972) is set in the rain forests of Costa Rica. It takes as its subjects ecology and feminism, and is believed to be the first feminist novel published by a Second Wave American feminist press. (Note: Shameless Hussy Press (San Lorenzo, CA) is credited with being the first feminist press in the United States (http://library.evergreen.edu/rarebooks/shamelesshussy.html ) Alta, editor of Shameless Hussy Press, also published some of the first work of Susan Griffin and Ntozake Shange.) McCarthy’s List is a comic novel set in Indianapolis in the 1950s. The Last Warrior Queen retells the myth of Inanna, the Sumerian goddess of sexual love, fertility, and warfare. A Grand Passion and The Kindness of Strangers are set in Europe and take as their subject three generations of women involved in the arts. Four of Mackey's novels (The Village of Bones, The Year The Horses Came, The Horses At The Gate, and The Fires of Spring) comprise her Earthsong Series. Set in Europe in the Neolithic Period, they deal with struggles between matristic earth-centered goddess-worshiping cultures and invading patriarchal nomads. Mackey's Season of Shadows is set at Harvard in the late 60's and deals with various political issues such as the Civil Rights Movement and protests against the United States' involvement in the Vietnam War. In 2003 and 2004, in a departure from her previous styles and themes, Mackey chose to write The Stand-In and Sweet Revenge under the pen name "Kate Clemens." Both are comic novels set in Los Angeles. She wrote two Civil War novels, The Notorious Mrs. Winston and The Widow’s War, which are set in Indiana and Kansas, respectively.

Mackey's poetry is hard to classify. Critics have called it "fierce," "surreal," "ecstatic," "passionately transcendent," and "corrosive," and noted her "hallucinatory troping" which is "continually deconstructing rational consciousness." In speaking of Mackey's collection Breaking The Fever, poet Jane Hirshfield noted: "The poetry in Breaking the Fever offers truths both personal & political, visions both actual and imaginatively broad …, set down with a sensuous, compassionate, and utterly unflinching eye." On several occasions, Garrison Keillor read Mackey's poems on his daily radio show and podcast The Writer’s Almanac. In 2011, Marsh Hawk Press published Mackey's sixth collection of poetry, Sugar Zone which won the 2012 PEN Oakland/Josephine Miles Literary Award. Her eighth collection, The Jaguars That Prowl Our Dreams: New and Selected Poems 1974 to 2018, won a Women’s Spirituality Book Award from the California Institute of Integral Studies; and the Eric Hoffer Small Press Award for the best book published by a small press. Mackey has said that many of her poems are inspired by the extremely high fevers she has experienced on multiple occasions and by the works of Brazilian novelists and poets, noting that often they "combine Portuguese and English as incantation to evoke the lyrical space that lies at the conjunction between the two languages." In 2014 Marsh Hawk published a new collection of Mackey's poetry Travelers With No Ticket Homeabout which The Huffington Post said: "It is difficult to resist the temptation to compare Mary Mackey to Elizabeth Bishop. Both poets are stunningly imagistic and musical." In 2018, when Mackey’s The Jaguars That Prowl Our Dreams: New and Selected Poems 1974 to 2018 was published, PANK magazine noted that: “Mackey is a magnificent thinker with broad passions: pagan cultures, literature, anthropology, ecology and history ... [whose] work, while stunningly layered, is always accessible.” “Mary Mackey,” said Tulsa Book Review, “is a national treasure. Her poetry resonates with feminism and the world of nature without any trace of didacticism. This is her eighth collection of poetry, and we are better for it.”

Mary Mackey’s literary papers are archived in the Sophia Smith Special Collections Library, Smith College, Northampton, MA. Her collection of rare editions of small press poetry books authored by Northern California poets is archived in the Smith College Mortimer Rare Book Room.

=== Novels ===
- Immersion, San Lorenzo, CA: Shameless Hussy Press (1972)
- McCarthy’s List, New York, NY: Doubleday (1979)
- The Last Warrior Queen, New York, NY: Putnam (1983)
- A Grand Passion, New York, NY: Simon & Schuster (1986)
- The Kindness of Strangers, New York, NY: Simon & Schuster (1988)
- Season of Shadows, New York, NY: Bantam Books (1991)
- The Year The Horses Came, San Francisco, CA: Harper San Francisco (1993)
- The Horses At The Gate, San Francisco, CA: Harper San Francisco (1996)
- The Fires of Spring, New York, NY: Penguin (1998)
- The Stand-In (under the pen name "Kate Clemens"), New York, NY: Kensington Books (2003)
- Sweet Revenge (under the pen name "Kate Clemens"), New York, NY: Kensington Books (2004)
- The Notorious Mrs. Winston, New York, NY: Berkley Books (2007)
- The Widow’s War, New York, NY: Berkley Books (2009)
- The Village of Bones: Sabalah’s Tale, New York, NY: Lowenstein Associates (2016)

=== Poetry collections ===
- Split Ends, Berkeley, CA: Ariel Press (1974)
- One Night Stand, Emeryville, CA: Effie's Press (1976)
- Skin Deep, Washington, DC: Gallimaufry Press (1978)
- The Dear Dance of Eros, Seattle WA: Fjord Press (1987)
- Breaking The Fever, New York, NY: Marsh Hawk Press (2006)
- Sugar Zone, New York, NY: Marsh Hawk Press (2011)
- Travelers With No Ticket Home, New York, NY: Marsh Hawk Press (2014)
- The Jaguars That Prowl Our Dreams: New and Selected Poems 1974 to 2019 (With an Introduction by D. Nurske), New York, NY: Marsh Hawk Press (2018)

=== Other works ===
- Silence (original screenplay). Film directed by John Korty (1974)
- McCarthy’s List (screenplay, adaptation of Mackey's novel). Warner Brothers (1980)
- Good Behavior (original screenplay co-authored with Ray Fox), (1982)
- The Spy (original screenplay, short subject, co-authored with Renée de Palma). Film directed by de Palma (2000)
- Creativity: Where Poems Begin, New York, NY: Marsh Hawk Press (2022)

== Awards and honors ==
- The Stand In was selected for Best Feature Film Screenplay at the 2023 City of Angels Women’s Film Festival in Los Angeles.
- Creativity: Where Poems Begin was nominated for the 42nd annual Northern California Book Award (NCBA) in Creative Nonfiction for 2022.
- 2022 City of Angels Women's Film Festival Award for Best Short Film Script for Time Piece
- Eric Hoffer Small Press Award for The Jaguars That Prowl Our Dreams: New and Selected Poems 1974 to 2018
- 2012 PEN Oakland/Josephine Miles Award for Literary Excellence for Sugar Zone.
- California Institute of Integral Studies Women's Spirituality Book Award for The Jaguars That Prowl Our Dreams: New and Selected Poems 1974 to 2018, 2018
- California Institute of Integral Studies Women's Spirituality Book Award for The Village of Bones: Sabalah's Tale, 2018
