= In This Corner (1948 film) =

- Directed by: Charles Reisner
- Written by: Fred Niblo Jr.; Burk Symon
- Produced by: David I. Stephenson
- Starring: Scott Brady; Anabel Shaw; James Millican
- Cinematography: Guy Roe
- Edited by: Norman Colbert; Alfred DeGaetano
- Music by: Albert Glasser
- Production company: ARC Productions
- Distributed by: Eagle-Lion Films
- Release date: September 20, 1948
- Running time: 59 minutes
- Country: United States
- Language: English

In This Corner is a 1948 American sports drama film directed by Charles Reisner and starring Scott Brady, Anabel Shaw and James Millican.

== Cast ==
- Scott Brady as Jimmy Weston
- Anabel Shaw as Sally Rivers
- James Millican as Charles 'Tug' Martin
- Mary Meade as Birdie Bronson
- Charles D. Brown as Victor 'Doc' Fuller
- Cy Kendall as Tiny Reed
- John Indrisano as Johnny Hart
- Robert Bice as Navy Commander Harris
- John Hamilton as Admiral in Harris' Office
- John Doucette as Dunkle
- Cliff Clark as CPO Mike Burke
- Bill Kennedy as Al Barton
- Tommy Garland as Paddy Dillon
- Dave Shilling as Whitey, Dillon's Trainer
- Renny McEvoy as Matt McGuire
- Don Forbes as TV Sportscaster
- Ralph Dunn as Gus

== Bibliography ==
- William H. Young & Nancy K. Young. World War II and the Postwar Years in America: A-I. ABC-CLIO, 2010.
