= Anabel Shaw =

American actress (1921–2010)

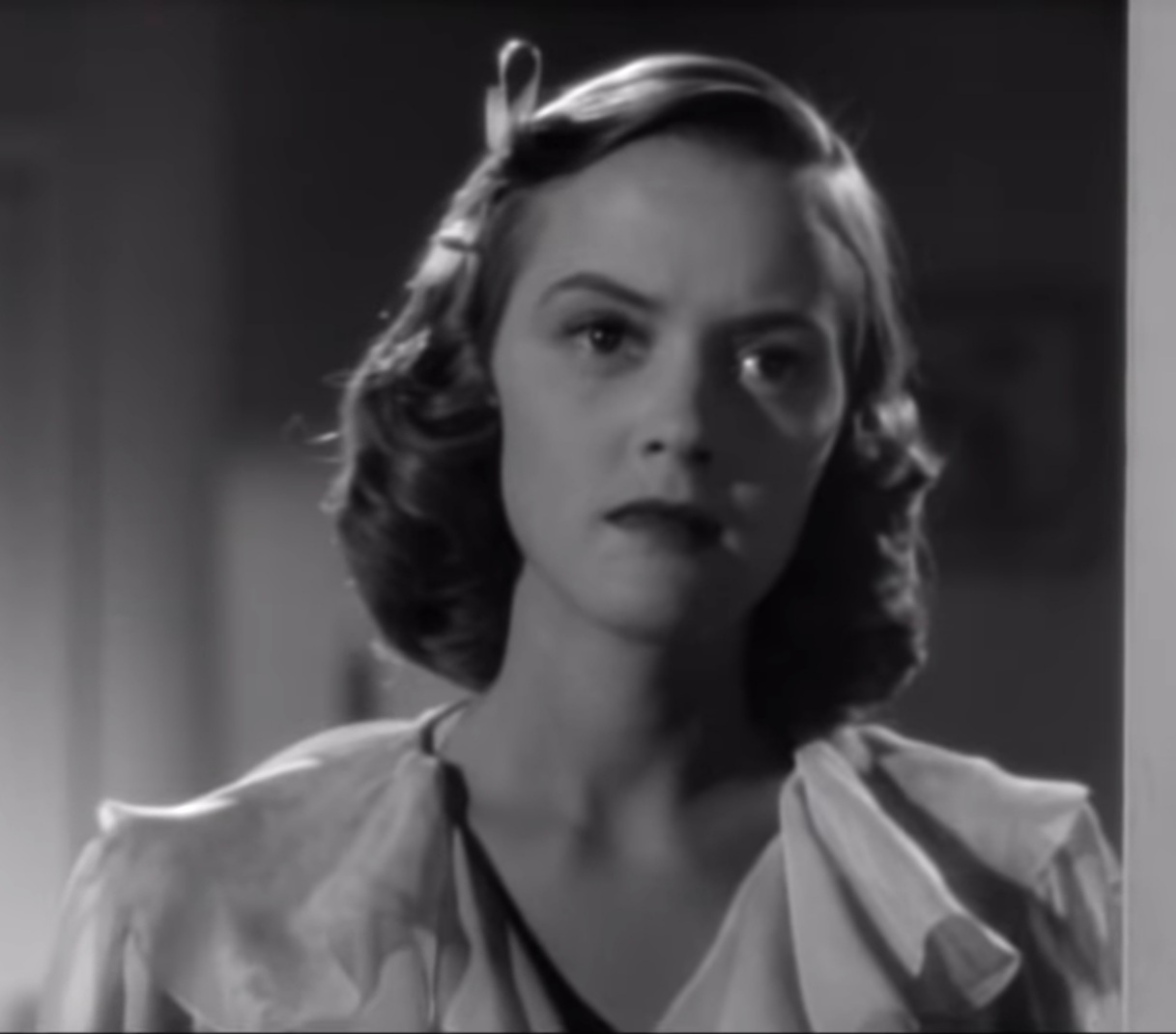
- Shaw in Shock (1946)
- Born: Marjorie Henshaw; June 24, 1921; Oakland, California, U.S.
- Died: April 16, 2010 (aged 88); Santa Barbara, California, U.S.
- Education: University of California
- Occupation: Actress
- Years active: 1944–1971
- Spouses: Joseph Ford (m. 1948; div. 1986) George Scopececk (m. 1986; died 1992)
- Children: 3, including Anabel Ford

Anabel Shaw (born Marjorie Henshaw; June 24, 1921 – April 16, 2010) was an American film actress. Active during the 1940s and 1950s in a mixture of lead and supporting roles, she then made a few appearances on television.

== Biography ==
Shaw was born Marjorie Henshaw on June 24, 1921, and was billed by that name when she made Here Come the Waves for Warner Bros. She graduated from the University of California.

Shaw married Joseph Ford, a professor of sociology. They had three children, archaeologist Anabel Ford, daughter CeCe, and son Steve. They later divorced in 1986. She later married George Scopececk.

Shaw died of breast cancer on April 16, 2010, aged 88. Her body was given to the UCLA Donated Body Program.

== Filmography ==
Year	Title	Role	Notes
1944	Here Come the Waves	Isabel	
1945	The Horn Blows at Midnight	Telephone Operator	Uncredited
1946	Shock	Mrs. Janet Stewart	
1946	Strange Triangle	Betty Wilson	
1946	One More Tomorrow	Secretary	Uncredited
1946	Home Sweet Homicide	Polly Walker	
1947	Killer at Large	Anne Arnold	
1947	Mother Wore Tights	Alice Flemmerhammer	
1947	Bulldog Drummond Strikes Back	Ellen Curtiss #2	
1947	High Tide	Dana Jones	
1947	Dangerous Years	Connie Burns	
1947	Secret Beyond the Door	Intellectual Sub-Deb	
1948	In This Corner	Sally Rivers	
1949	City Across the River	Mrs. Jean Albert	
1949	Hold That Baby!	Laura Andrews	
1950	Gun Crazy	Ruby Tare Flagler	
1955	Six Bridges to Cross	Virginia Stewart	Uncredited
1955	To Hell and Back	Helen	
1955	At Gunpoint	Mrs. Ann Clark	Uncredited
1957	Alfred Hitchcock Presents	Rhoda Forbes	Season 3 Episode 11: "The Deadly"
1971	The Mephisto Waltz	Nurse	Uncredited, (final film role)

== Bibliography ==
- Keaney, Michael F. Film Noir Guide: 745 Films of the Classic Era, 1940-1959. McFarland, 2003.
