= Here Come the Waves =

1944 film by Mark Sandrich

Here Comes the Waves
- Theatrical release poster
- Directed by: Mark Sandrich
- Screenplay by: Allan Scott; Ken Englund; Zion Myers
- Produced by: Mark Sandrich
- Starring: Bing Crosby; Betty Hutton; Sonny Tufts
- Cinematography: Charles Lang
- Edited by: Ellsworth Hoagland
- Music by: Harold Arlen; Johnny Mercer; Robert Emmett Dolan
- Production company: Paramount Pictures
- Distributed by: Paramount Pictures
- Release date: December 27, 1944 (New York City)
- Running time: 99 minutes
- Country: United States
- Language: English

Here Come the Waves is a 1944 American romantic musical comedy film directed by Mark Sandrich and starring Bing Crosby, Betty Hutton and Sonny Tufts, with Ann Doran, Gwen Crawford, Noel Neill, Catherine Craig and Anabel Shaw (credited as Marjorie Henshaw). Produced and released by Paramount Pictures, the film introduced the song "Ac-Cent-Tchu-Ate the Positive", written by Harold Arlen and Johnny Mercer and sung by Crosby and Tufts in the film.

Ac-Cent-Tchu-Ate the Positive became a hit record for Crosby and songwriter Johnny Mercer, of which the latter's recording was inducted into the Library of Congress's National Recording Registry for its "cultural, artistic and/or historical significance to American society and the nation’s audio legacy".

At the 18th Academy Awards, the film earned a nomination for Best Music (Song) for Ac-Cent-Tchu-Ate the Positive.

The plot centers on two singing sisters, the Alison twins, both played by Hutton, who join the Women Accepted for Voluntary Emergency Service, better known by its acronym, the WAVES. Johnny Cabot, played by Crosby, is a famous singer who enlists in the navy, joining his old friend, Windy Windhurst, played by Tufts. The sisters subsequently get into tangled romantic relationships with both Cabot and Windhurst.

== Plot ==
The Allison Twins are identical sisters, except that one is blonde and the other is a redhead. Temperamentally though, they are quite different. Susie, the blonde, is brash and scatter-brained, while Rosemary, the redhead, is serious and reliable. Together they make up a sister act where they sing patriotic songs. Rosemary joins the Women Accepted for Voluntary Emergency Service or the WAVES, although Susie is reluctant at first, she ends up joining the WAVES as well. Susie is infatuated with popular singer Johnny Cabot and after weeks of WAVES training, uses her night off to see him in concert.

After the concert, Johnny finds an old friend, Windy Windhurst, who has joined the Navy. Johnny wishes to follow in his father’s footsteps and join the navy but his application has been refused because he is color-blind. Together, Windy and Johnny visit the 21 Club, and Windy meets the twins, whom he already knows, and introduces them to Johnny. Both men are attracted to Rosemary, while Susie becomes even more infatuated with Johnny. Johnny is eventually accepted into the Navy after physical requirements are lowered and is hoping for assignment to the U.S.S. Douglas, the ship on which his father had served on with distinction. Rosemary is dining with Windy and Johnny joins them. Johnny tricks a couple of military policemen to remove Windy from the restaurant. Johnny croons to Rosemary and she falls in love with him.

Johnny soon finds out that he and Windy are being assigned to the U.S.S. Douglas and prepares for his deployment. Susie, still captivated by Johnny and wishing for him not to go, forges his signature on a letter suggesting for a show to be produced by Johnny to aid WAVES recruitment. The suggestion is accepted, and Johnny is placed as producer, stage manager and a performer. Thinking that Windy is responsible for the suggestion being put forward in his name, Johnny chooses him as his assistant.

Rosemary learns from Windy that she and Susie are joining Johnny's show. However, she thinks Johnny is doing it to avoid active service. Johnny gets hold of the written suggestion to prove to Rosemary it is not his handwriting but Susie steals, then destroys the letter. When Johnny fails to present the letter to Rosemary, she disbelieves him and leaves the show.

Rosemary is assigned to a local air traffic control tower but returns to the show to convince Susie to leave because of her false impression that Johnny is a coward. Upon learning of her return to the show, Johnny decides he’ll propose to Rosemary. Windy learns of Johnny’s plan and persuades Susie to don a redhaired wig and pretend to be Rosemary. In this guise she kisses and paws Windy publicly. Johnny is thus faced with Rosemary's disbelief and her apparent preference for Windy.

Johnny writes a note for Windy and leaves the show. Windy, realising the true feeling between Johnny and Rosemary, explains the scheme to Johnny with Susie. Susie confesses to Johnny that it was she who sent in the suggestion and he returns to the show. Rosemary finds out the truth and apologies for the misunderstanding. She manages to get Johnny and Windy reassigned to the U.S.S. Douglas.

The show is a success and Susie discovers she is no longer in love with Johnny and instead, after their scheme, is really in love with Windy. Johnny and Windy are flown out for assignment on the U.S.S. Douglas.

== Cast ==
- Bing Crosby as Johnny Cabot
- Betty Hutton as Susan / Rosemary Allison
- Sonny Tufts as Windy 'Pinetop' Windhurst
- Ann Doran as Ruth
- Gwen Crawford as Tex
- Noel Neill as Dorothy
- Catherine Craig as Lt. Townsend
- Anabel Shaw (credited as Marjorie Henshaw) as Isobel
- Harry Barris as Announcer (at '21 Club') (uncredited)
- Mae Clarke as Ensign Kirk (uncredited)
- Minor Watson as Officer (uncredited)
- Oscar O'Shea as The Commodore (uncredited)
- Jimmy Dundee as Chief Petty Officer (uncredited)
- Mona Freeman as Girl (uncredited)
- Jack Norton as Waiter (Cabana Club) (uncredited)
- James Flavin as Patrolman (uncredited)
- Weldon Heyburn as Civilian (uncredited)
- Kay Linaker as Girl (uncredited)
- Yvonne De Carlo as Girl (uncredited)
- Greta Granstedt as Control Tower operator (uncredited)

== Soundtrack ==
Nine songs were used in the film, six of which were introduced in the film. All songs were written by Harold Arlen and Johnny Mercer, except for "Moonlight Becomes You," which was written by Johnny Burke and Jimmy Van Heusen.

- "Ac-Cent-Tchu-Ate the Positive" — Performed by Bing Crosby and Sonny Tufts (in blackface)
- "That Old Black Magic" — Performed by Bing Crosby
- "Moonlight Becomes You" — Performed by Bing Crosby
- "Here Come the Waves" — Performed by Chorus
- "I Promise You" — Performed by Bing Crosby and Betty Hutton
- "Let's Take the Long Way Home" — Performed by Bing Crosby
- "The Navy Song" — Performed by Betty Hutton
- "There's a Fella Waiting in Poughkeepsie" — Performed by Betty Hutton

"My Mama Thinks I'm a Star" was also written for the film but it was not used.

Crosby recorded four of the songs for Decca Records. “Ac-Cent-Tchu-Ate the Positive” was in the Billboard charts for nine weeks with a peak position of #2. Crosby's songs were also included in the Bing's Hollywood series.

A dispute arose between which music publishing company had the rights to the songs of Here Come The Waves. Paramount claimed they had the rights to the songs and thus would earn the revenue from the sheet music. This was contested by Edwin H. Morris Music, who represented songwriters Mercer and Arlen, with both companies vying to produce sheet music for the film's score. Bing Crosby signed a contract with Edwin H. Morris Music, calling for all the music of his upcoming movies to be distributed by them, ending the dispute.

== Production ==
The film was the first directed by Sandrich under his new revised contract to Paramount, calling for a film a year to be directed by him. Here Come The Waves was the last film of Sandrich's career as he died suddenly of a heart attack in March, 1945.

The film's working title was "Song of the Waves" and it was originally meant to be produced in Technicolor.

Filming took place between May to August, 1944.

Director Mark Sandrich discussed his plans for the film with Mildred H. McAfee, the director of the WAVES, to make the film as accurate as possible.

== Release and reception ==
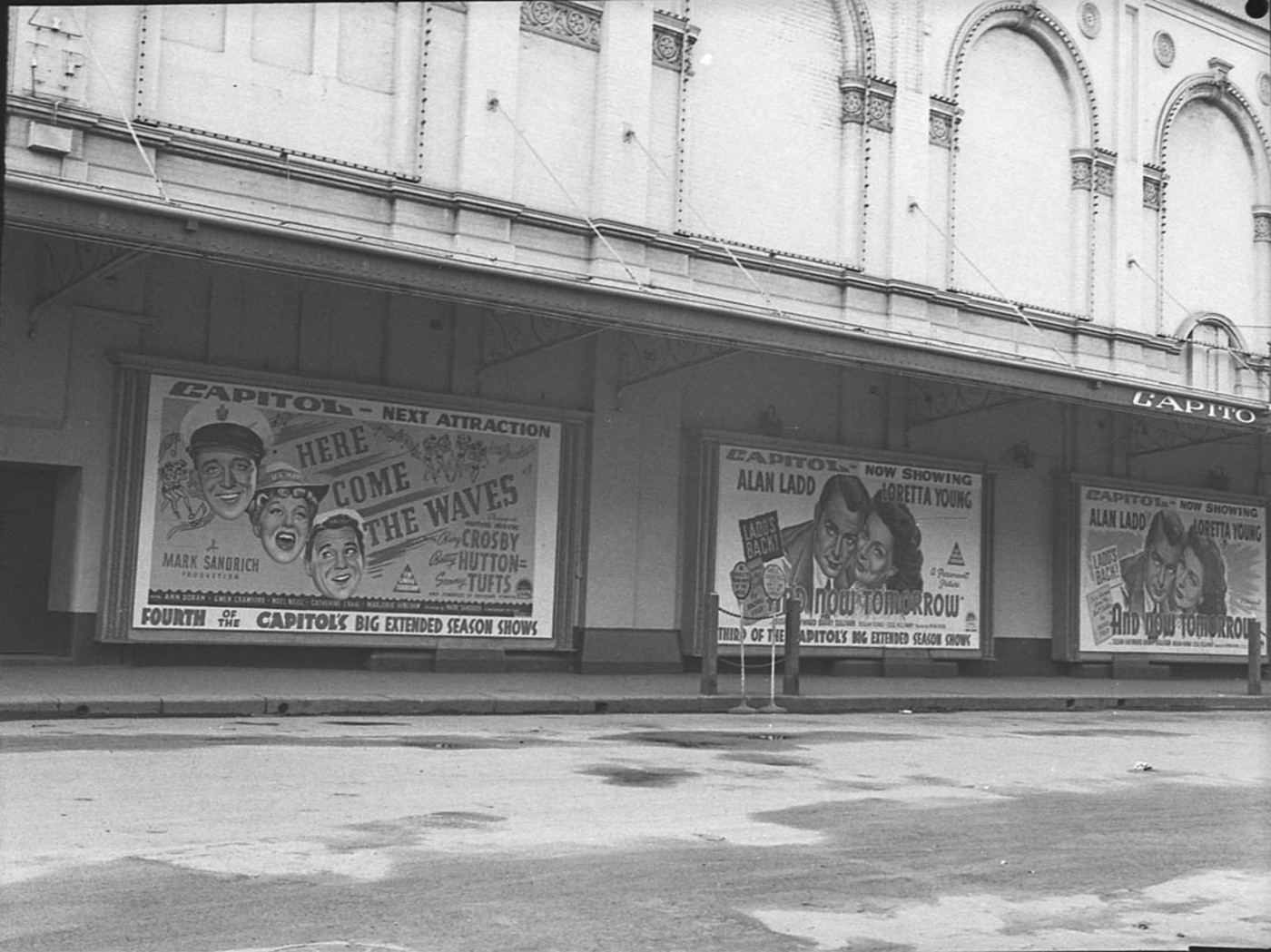
Here Come The Waves poster on display during its initial theatrical run, Sydney, Australia

The film premiered at the Paramount Theatre in New York City on December 27, 1944 and was opened by Woody Herman and his Orchestra.

Bosley Crowther of The New York Times commented, "Paramount and its favored son, Bing Crosby aren't going precisely the same way that they went in Mr. Crosby's last picture ('Going My Way')—and everyone knows which way that was—but they are taking an agreeable turn together in "Here Come the Waves," which trooped into the Paramount yesterday. They are ambling along that vein of comedy, with vamped-in music, that Mr. Crosby used to rove, and they have Sonny Tufts and Betty Hutton as convivial companions this time. Sure, the traveling is nothing like as charming as it was on that last prize-winning tour, but it offers a few attractive vistas and several gaily amusing jolts... Regarding Miss Hutton's dual performance, it should not be mistaken for high art, but it certainly can be commended as very vigorous virtuosity... Paramount, in short, has been generous to the service in every respect. But the humor is the best part of the picture—and the best part of the humor is that which has Bing crooning in travesty of a famous "swooner" who shall be nameless (just this once)."

Variety wrote that, "Here Come the Waves manages to surmount the handle and emerges as a tiptop film. Interspersed in Crosby's nifty songalogy, Johnny Mercer-Harold Arlen have supplied a set of excellent songs, including a dandy novelty in "Ac-Cent-Tchu-Ate the Positive"; two corking ballads in "Let's Take the Long Way Home" and "I Promise You," the latter as a duet with Betty Hutton playing the alter ego...'Old Black Magic' is reprised in a delicious rib on Frank Sinatra. Crosby is cast as the new pash crooner, and his mike-clutching stance, accented by the whinnying dames, leaves no secret as to whom Der Bingle refers. It's a dandy take-off on The Voice, but it's not harsh; in fact, it's a sympathetic salve for all out-of-service crooners..."

=== Home Media ===
The film was released on VHS in 1994, DVD on 19 January, 2011 and Blu-Ray on 17 February, 2026. All three releases were by Universal Pictures Home Entertainment.

== Legacy ==
The film is recognized by the American Film Institute in these lists:

- 2004: AFI's 100 Years...100 Songs:
  - "Ac-Cent-Tchu-Ate the Positive" – Nominated

== See also ==
- List of American films of 1944
