= Anabel Ford =

American archaeologist (born 1951)

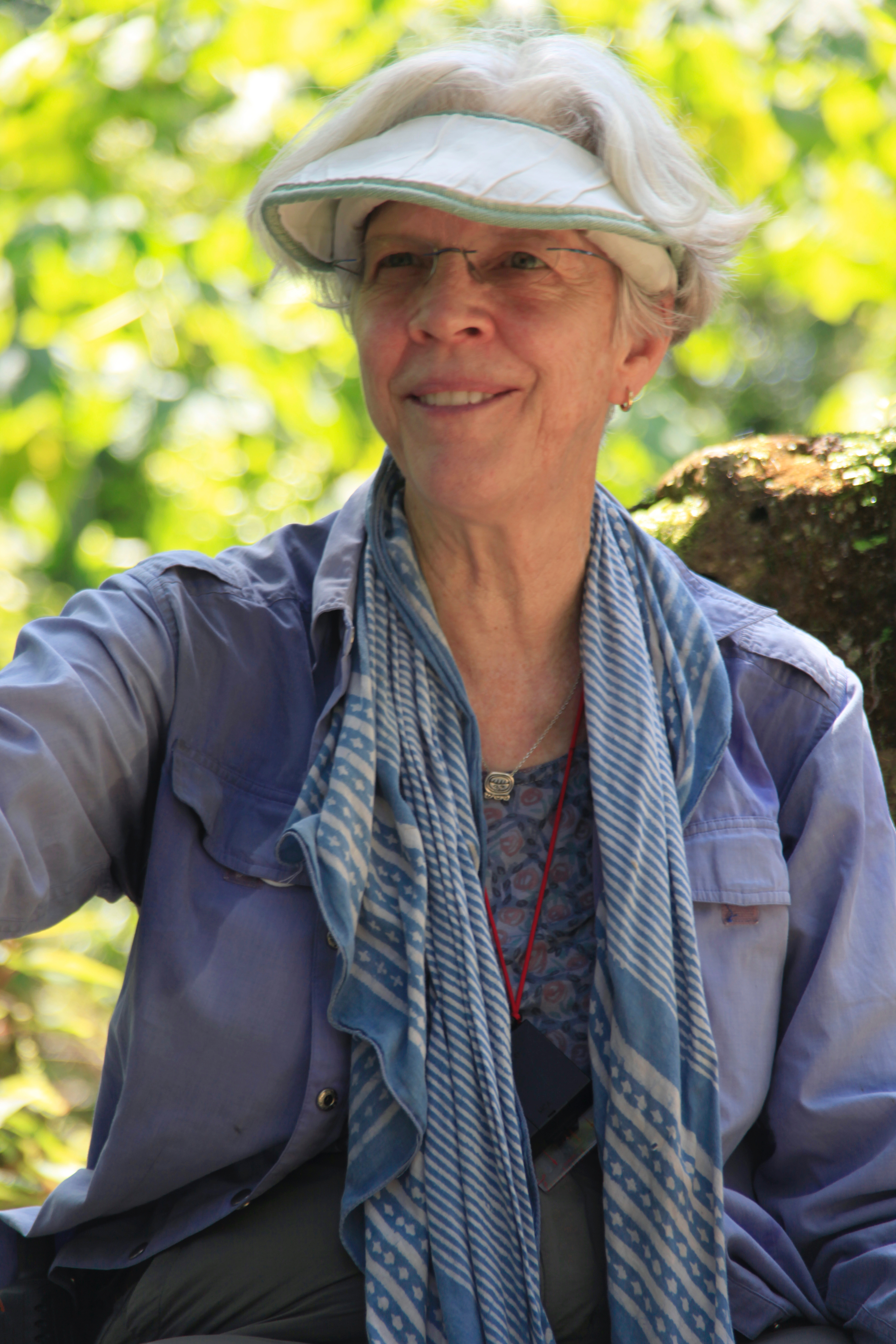
- Ford in 2023
- Born: 22 December 1951 (age 74); Los Angeles County, California, U.S.
- Education: University of California, Santa Barbara
- Known for: Discovery of El Pilar, Maya civilization archaeology
- Scientific career
- Fields: Anthropology; Archaeology

Anabel Ford (born 22 December 1951) is an American archaeologist specializing in the study of Mesoamerica, with a focus on the lowland Maya of Belize and Guatemala. She is recognized for her discovery of the ancient Maya city of El Pilar. Ford is currently affiliated with the Institute of Social Behavioral and Economic Research (ISBER) and is the director of the MesoAmerican Research Center (MARC) at the University of California, Santa Barbara.

== Early life ==
Born in Los Angeles in 1951, Ford is the oldest of three children. Her father, Joseph B. Ford, was a professor of sociology at California State University, Northridge and spoke German, Italian, French, Spanish, and Japanese and could read and write in Latin. Anabel Ford's mother, actress Marjorie Henshaw, was also known by her stage name Anabel Shaw. Ford's interest in Mesoamerican prehistory—Teotihuacan, Monte Albán, Chichen Itza—led her to choose a research career around the jungles that enveloped Maya sites. In 1981, Ford received her PhD at the University of California, Santa Barbara, with her doctoral dissertation based on a settlement survey of the transect (La Brecha Anabel) she established between Tikal and Yaxha in the Peten of Guatemala. She began her scholarly career as a research scientist at UCSB. In 1986 Ford became the director of the Mesoamerican Research Center.

== Work ==
Ford began her work in the Maya lowlands in 1972. In 1978 while working on her doctorate, Ford mapped a transect between the Maya cities of Tikal and Yaxhá in the Petén of northern Guatemala.

In 1983, Ford initiated the Belize River Archaeological Settlement Survey, or BRASS, project in order to better examine the settlement patterns and cultural ecology of the Maya region. In the course of that survey she and her team discovered the ancient Maya city, El Pilar. In the following years the BRASS team excavated many sites from under the forest canopy. From 1983 to 1989, Ford and her team focused on the residential settlement patterns of the El Pilar area. From 1990 to 1992, Ford and her team focused on the full-scale excavation of representative residential of the El Pilar area. Investigations that began in 1993 at El Pilar resulted in detailed maps and site chronology for the monuments. Now that El Pilar is protected in Belize and Guatemala, and destined to be a peace park, current field research is focused on mapping the residential component of El Pilar, identifying undiscovered sites and monuments. The team has worked with Lidar since 2013, field protocol funded by National Geographic, which led to the discovery of The Citadel, a hilltop temple complex.

While Ford's work was focused on the landscape of the Maya region, she developed an increasing understanding of local knowledge and practices. She developed a conservation strategy called Archaeology Under the Canopy. This strategy promotes forest conservation in order to preserve cultural heritage. The forest surrounding El Pilar serves as protection for the monuments and artifacts created by the ancient city's residents. Therefore, conserving the forest ultimately protects the region's cultural heritage. Her efforts helped set aside nearly 2,000 Ha in the El Pilar area.

Ford's work at El Pilar and with master Maya Forest gardeners is profiled in The Modern Maya Incidents of Travel and Friendship in Yucatan (University of Texas Press 2012), a work on the living Maya by Macduff Everton. Everton's narrative breadth shows the importance of historical perspectives on Maya landscapes for the conservation and development of the Maya Forest. Ford's work converges with Everton's and they have collaborated in the field and with presentations and publications that demonstrate the value of traditional Maya knowledge. Ford also collaborates with Ronald Nigh, an ethnologist and ecological anthropologist working with traditional Maya farmers. Their book, The Maya Forest Garden: Eight Millennia of Sustainable Cultivation of the Tropical Woodlands, examines both contemporary tropical farming techniques and the archaeological record to make the argument that these ancient techniques, still in use today, can support significant populations over long periods of time. They argue that traditional Maya practices serve as solutions to contemporary problems, such as sustainability, climate change, and natural resource scarcity.

Ford is president of Exploring Solutions Past: the Maya Forest Alliance, which is a nonprofit organization promoting the global significance of the Maya culture. Ford suggests that traditional Maya practices potentially serve as solutions to contemporary problems, such as climate change and natural resource scarcity. Exploring Solutions Past: Maya Forest Alliance teams up with the Maya farmers of El Pilar Forest Garden Network in order to support sustainable agriculture in the region.

In 2000, she was an Associate Laureate for Cultural Heritage sponsored by the Rolex Awards for Enterprise.

In addition to her archaeological work in the El Pilar region, Ford, as of 2013, is a board member of the Duke of Edinburgh Awards.

== Personal life ==
She was married for 53 years to archeologist Michael Glassow, a partnership only ending with his death in December 2025.

== Notable publications ==
- Ford, Anabel; Arnold, Jeanne T. (1980). "A Statistical Examination of Settlement Patterns at Tikal, Guatemala". American Antiquity. 45 (4): 713–726. doi:10.2307/280143. JSTOR 280143. S2CID 161300959.
- Ford, Anabel (1986). Population Growth and Social Complexity: An Examination of Settlement and Environment in the Central Maya Lowlands. Arizona State University. ISBN 978-0961193256.
- Ford, Anabel; Fedick, Scott (1992-04-01). "Prehistoric Maya Settlement Patterns in the Upper Belize River Area: Initial Results of the Belize River Archaeological Settlement Survey". Journal of Field Archaeology. 19 (1): 35–49. doi:10.2307/530367. JSTOR 530367.
- Ford, Anabel (1994). "Women in Mesoamerican Archaeology: Why Are the Best Men Winning?". In Claassen, Cheryl (ed.). Women in Archaeology. Philadelphia: University of Pennsylvania Press. pp. 159–172. ISBN 978-0812232776.
- Ford, Anabel; Rose, William I. (1995-07-01). "Volcanic ash in ancient Maya ceramics of the limestone lowlands: implications for prehistoric volcanic activity in the Guatemala highlands". Journal of Volcanology and Geothermal Research. Models of Magnetic Processes and Volcanic Eruptions. 66 (1–4): 149–162. Bibcode:1995JVGR...66..149F. doi:10.1016/0377-0273(94)00068-R.
- Ford, Anabel (1996). "Critical Resource Control and the Rise of the Classical Period Maya". In Fedick, Scott L. (ed.). The Managed Mosaic: Ancient Maya Agriculture and Resource Use. Salt Lake City, Utah: University of Utah Press. pp. 297–303. ISBN 978-0874805192.
- Ford, Anabel; Clarke, Keith C.; Raines, Gary (2009-09-29). "Modeling Settlement Patterns of the Late Classic Maya Civilization with Bayesian Methods and Geographic Information Systems". Annals of the Association of American Geographers. 99 (3): 496–520. doi:10.1080/00045600902931785. S2CID 42209712.
- Ford, Anabel (2008-09-01). "Dominant Plants Of The Maya Forest And Gardens Of El Pilar: Implications For Paleoenvironmental Reconstructions". Journal of Ethnobiology. 28 (2): 179–199. doi:10.2993/0278-0771-28.2.179. ISSN 0278-0771. S2CID 10456484.
- Ford, Anabel; Nigh, Ronald (2009). "Origins of the Maya Forest Garden: Maya Resource Management". Journal of Ethnobiology. 29 (2): 213–236. doi:10.2993/0278-0771-29.2.213. ISSN 0278-0771. S2CID 19563692.
- Ford, Anabel; Nigh, Ronald (June 2015). The Maya Forest Garden. California: Left Coast Press. ISBN 978-1-61132-998-8.
