= Dangerous Years =

1947 film by Arthur Pierson

- Theatrical release poster
- Directed by: Arthur Pierson
- Screenplay by: Arnold Belgard
- Story by: Arnold Belgard
- Produced by: Howard Sheehan
- Starring: William Halop; Ann E. Todd; Scotty Beckett; Jerome Cowan; Richard Gaines; Anabel Shaw; Marilyn Monroe
- Cinematography: Benjamin H. Kline
- Edited by: William F. Claxton
- Music by: Ralph Stanley; Rudy Schrager
- Production company: Sol M. Wurtzel Productions
- Distributed by: 20th Century-Fox
- Release date: December 7, 1947 (United States)
- Running time: 62 minutes
- Country: United States
- Language: English

Marilyn Monroe's brief scene as waitress Evie

Dangerous Years is a 1947 American drama film produced by Sol M. Wurtzel, directed by Arthur Pierson, starring Billy Halop, Scotty Beckett and Ann E. Todd. Marilyn Monroe makes her first onscreen appearance as Evie, the waitress in the restaurant scenes.

== Plot ==
The God-fearing residents of Middleton are worried that the Gopher Hole, a new roadhouse restaurant outside of town, will bring their teenage kids to ruin. Jeff Carter, a local teacher who also runs a youth club for the boys, takes a closer look at the place to see if the worries are justified.

Jeff discovers that a group of boys from town, including Willy Miller, Gene Spooner and the tough Danny Jones, are robbing a warehouse in town. Jeff tries to stop them, but in the struggle is shot and killed by Danny. The boys flee, using Willy's father's delivery truck, but the truck is recognized by a witness working at the warehouse. The boys hide out at the Gopher Hole, joining a game of cards and acting as if they have been there all night. The police soon arrive at the Gopher Hole and arrest the boys. Danny is the only boy who isn't under age, and he is prosecuted for first degree murder by district attorney Edgar Burns.

At the trial, Burns claims that Danny had planned to kill Jeff because of their previous encounters and the fact that Danny hated Jeff. Another boy, Leo Emerson, tells how Danny encouraged the boys at Jeff's youth club to visit the Gopher Hole, and then led them into other activities such as gambling and robbing gas stations. When Jeff tried to stop Danny's activities, and even offered Danny a job at the youth club, Danny refused and threatened to punch Jeff for interfering. Leo stopped his own involvement with Danny when Leo's absent father returned to the family home. Willy admits to taking his father's truck without permission and serving as lookout at the warehouse robbery, but in the process reveals that his father physically abuses him. Doris, a lonely teenage girl who is neglected by her parents and is in love with Danny, tries to lie on the stand to protect him, but breaks down when pressured by district attorney Burns.

Before the prosecution rests its case, Burns' beloved daughter Connie nearly causes a scandal when she admits to being close friends with Danny ten years ago, when they were both living at an orphanage. Burns explains that he was unaware for many years that he had a daughter, since his marriage was annulled and his wife disappeared without telling him she was pregnant. Some years later, Miss Templeton, the proprietor of the orphanage, contacted him, and he took Connie home. Connie was unable to say goodbye to her friend Danny before she left the orphanage, and had no further contact with him until the trial.

Miss Templeton, now elderly and in poor health, arrives to see Danny, having read about the case in the newspapers. She reveals to Danny that he, not Connie, is actually Burns' child, and that she lied and falsified records to pass Connie off as Burns' child instead, because Connie was weaker and was going to die if she wasn't removed from the orphanage. Miss Templeton wants to tell Burns, but Danny makes her promise not to reveal the secret, as he does not want to ruin Connie's good life with the man she thinks is her father. Nevertheless, Miss Templeton tries to tell the secret to the court anyway, but is interrupted by Danny publicly admitting to shooting Jeff, thus sealing his fate. While Danny is talking, Miss Templeton dies on the stand before she can testify.

In the end, Danny is convicted of Jeff's murder but manages to escape the death penalty, instead getting a sentence of life in prison. He is reminded that even a life sentence may be ended early for good behavior, and Connie and Burns promise to help him in every way they can.

== Cast ==
- William Halop as Danny Jones
- Scotty Beckett as Willy Miller
- Richard Gaines as Edgar Burns
- Ann E. Todd as Doris Martin
- Jerome Cowan as Weston
- Anabel Shaw as Connie Burns
- Darryl Hickman as Leo Emerson
- Dickie Moore as Gene Spooner
- Harry Harvey Jr. as Phil Kenny
- Gil Stratton Jr. as Tammy McDonald
- Harry Shannon as Judge Raymond
- Donald Curtis as Jeff Carter
- Joseph Vitale as August Miller
- Marilyn Monroe as Evie
- Nana Bryant as Miss Templeton
- Tom Kennedy as Adamson

== Reception ==
The film is sought out by contemporary audiences primarily for Monroe's first onscreen performance, despite poor critical reception of the film. In 1992, Ty Burr of Entertainment Weekly gave the "juvenile-delinquent saga" a D letter grade. While writing for Vulture.com, critic Angelica Jade Bastién called the film a "emotionally convoluted drama."
