= Archaeology Under the Canopy =

Archaeology Under the Canopy is a conservation strategy developed by Dr. Anabel Ford for the preservation of pre-Columbian Maya monuments at the archeological site El Pilar, an ancient Maya center on the border of Belize and Guatemala. This style of conservation encourages the conservation of Maya forest foliage for the protection of monuments and the strategic exposure of ancient structures.

== Objective ==
The objective of Archaeology Under the Canopy is to preserve Maya cultural heritage by protecting the forest canopy guarding ancient Maya artifacts and monuments from damaging elements. The El Pilar Archaeological Reserve for Flora and Fauna practices this conservation strategy and treats the forest as if it was another piece of ancient Maya civilization. This conservation strategy aims to become an example for other future projects by showing the benefits of cooperating with nature rather than destroying it. With the increasing support of Archaeology Under the Canopy, the knowledge of environmental conservation for cultural conservation can spread and potentially improve other ancient sites around the world.

== Standard approaches to excavation ==
Exposing ancient architecture provokes the natural process of degradation and decomposition. The standard approach to excavation is to remove soil and foliage to reveal and record archaeological remains. After the excavation is complete, dramatic monuments are typically consolidated and left exposed for public viewing and tourism. Fully exposed monuments are then at risk of looting or other forms of potential damage. Over the past century of excavation in the Maya world, wind, rain, and acid-producing microbes have caused extensive damage on ancient limestone monuments. Pieces of Maya history have started to disappear due to the loss of the natural environment surrounding ancient Maya sites.

== Archaeology Under the Canopy’s alternative approach ==
Archaeology Under the Canopy has four main components: the forest canopy, the practice of forest gardening, the leaf litter on the forest floor, and the ancient monuments. Each of these components plays an important part of the innovative conservation strategy. The natural environment is recognized as protection for ancient monuments.

After an excavation is complete, monuments or sections of monuments – such as a wall, room, stair, or doorjamb – are selected for consolidation and viewing. The majority of the monument is left covered with plant foliage for stabilization. Fully exposing the ancient monuments by clearing its natural environment accelerates the natural degradation process. Archaeology Under the Canopy protects the monument from the elements and the integrity of the environment for the future.

This presentation style of monuments encourages visitors to kindle their imagination and consider other aspects of Maya life beyond elite architecture. Visitors are inspired to ask about the forest context of this advanced civilization, its relationship to the environment, plant use, land management, forest regeneration, and what happens when monuments are neglected over time.

Archaeology Under the Canopy introduces long-term manipulation schemes around local forest regions that will allow for immediate benefits to local people and valuable experimental data. Therefore, local communities are encouraged to participate in the conservation and evolution of the Maya forest so that the knowledge of conservation continues to spread.

== Influential charters ==
Though Archaeology Under the Canopy was conceptualized for the Maya world, it is based on the Athens Charter for the Restoration of Historic Monuments, the International Charter for the Conservation and Restoration of Monuments and Sites, and the Australia ICOMOS Charter for the Conservation of Places of Cultural Significance. The practice of Archaeology Under the Canopy has implications for archaeological conservation all over the world, integrating environmental and cultural contexts of a site.

== See also ==
- conservation sciences
- historical preservation
