= Killer at Large (1947 film) =

1947 film by William Beaudine

- Directed by: William Beaudine
- Written by: Fenton Earnshaw; Thomas W. Blackburn
- Produced by: Buck Gottlieb
- Starring: Robert Lowery; Anabel Shaw; Charles Evans; Frank Ferguson
- Cinematography: James S. Brown Jr.
- Edited by: Harry Reynolds; Alfred DeGaetano
- Music by: Albert Glasser
- Production company: Producers Releasing Corporation
- Distributed by: Producers Releasing Corporation
- Release date: May 31, 1947
- Running time: 61 minutes
- Country: United States
- Language: English

Killer at Large is a 1947 American crime film directed by William Beaudine and starring Robert Lowery, Anabel Shaw and Charles Evans.

== Plot ==
Paul Kimberly, a newspaper reporter, quits his job to investigate crooked dealings at a local veterans' housing administration. The newspaper editor assigns reporter Anne Arnold to lure him back to the paper. The two reporters expose an embezzling ring.

== Cast ==
- Robert Lowery as Paul Kimberly
- Anabel Shaw as Anne Arnold
- Charles Evans as Vincent Arnold
- Frank Ferguson as Edward Denton
- George Lynn as Rand
- Dick Rich as Bull Callahan
- Ann Stanton as Margo Tremaine
- Leonard Penn as Brent Maddux
- Eddie Parks as Richard - the Clerk
- Stanley Blystone as Captain McManus
- Howard M. Mitchell as Whiteman
- Jack Cheatham as Brandon
- Charles King as Bartender
- Phil Arnold as Taxi Driver

== Bibliography ==
- Marshall, Wendy L. William Beaudine: From Silents to Television. Scarecrow Press, 2005.
