= El Pilar =

Maya archaeological site in Belize and Guatemala

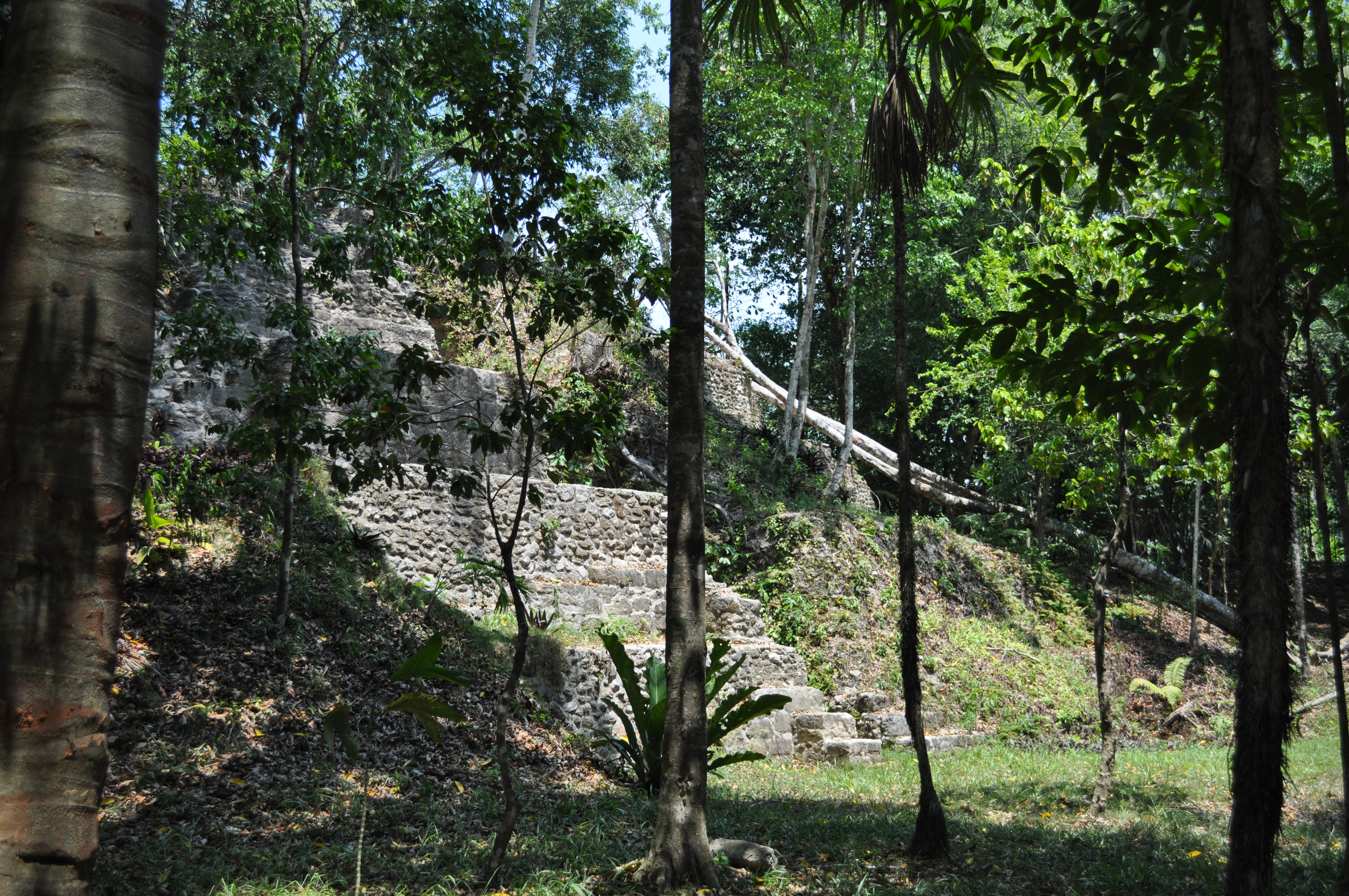
- Tzunu'un, a Maya house site surrounded by forest vegetation at El Pilar
- Interactive map of El Pilar
- Location: Guatemala / Belize
- Coordinates: 17°15′24″N 89°09′19″W
- Area: 20 km^{2} (7.7 sq mi)
- Elevation: 200 m (660 ft)
- Visitors: allowed

El Pilar is an ancient Maya city center located on the Belize-Guatemala border. The site is located 12 kilometres (7.5 mi) north of San Ignacio, Belize and can be accessed through the San Ignacio and Bullet Tree Falls on the Belize River. The name "El Pilar" is Spanish for "watering basin", reflecting the abundance of streams around the site and below its escarpment, which is rare in the Maya area.

The monuments of El Pilar are at the center of a 5,000 acres (2,000 ha) protected area known as El Pilar Archeological Reserve for Maya Flora and Fauna, declared a cultural monument in both Belize and Guatemala in 1998. El Pilar is the largest Maya site in the Belize River area with over 25 plazas and hundreds of other major buildings, covering about 120 acres (49 ha).

== Archeological discovery ==
Archaeologist Anabel Ford first mapped El Pilar in 1983 in the course of her Belize River Archaeological Settlement Survey or BRASS project. Settlement patterns in the region suggest a hierarchy of community size and composition that was directly related to farmland. One of the most extensive areas was of farmlands discovered at El Pilar, 10 kilometres (6.2 mi) north of the Belize River on the edge of the major upland escarpment that leads 47 kilometres (29 mi) to the major center of Tikal.

== History ==
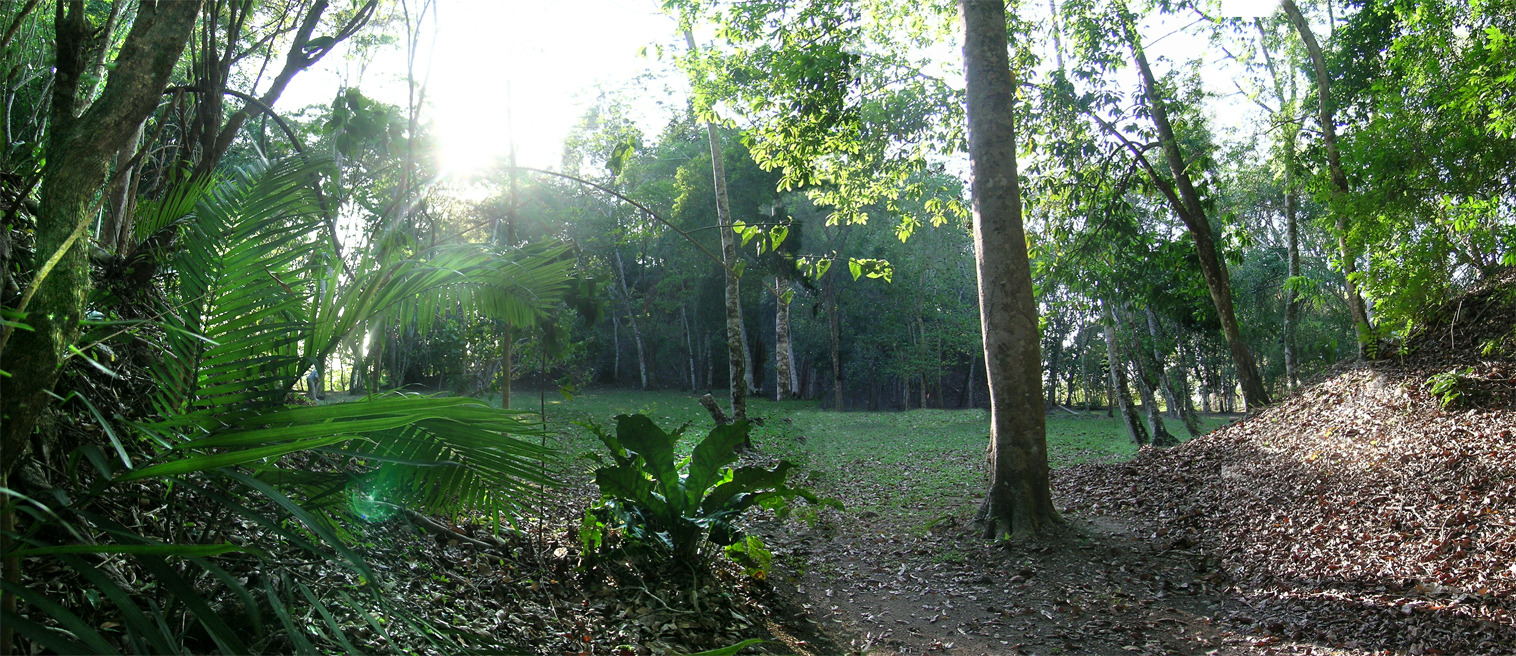
Plaza Copal in October 2005

Since 1993, a major archaeological field survey excavation project marked the initial examination of El Pilar. Under the direction of Anabel Ford, the detailed map was executed with engineering survey instruments and excavations focused on access ways, stairs, and doorways. When the monuments were mapped, the team verified the causeway system that linked from the east to the west uniting one ancient Maya center in two modern nations: Belize and Guatemala. Later excavations tunneled into major temple revealing a 2000 years construction history. Ford and her team are currently working with Lidar in order to map the area more extensively.

The city grew from Middle Preclassic period (800 BC), with the first small temples and plazas identified in the main eastern temple of Plaza Copal. The civic area was expanded, reaching its greatest extent before 1000 AD. At its height in the Late Classic, the total population of El Pilar is estimated to have exceeded 180,000.

Ford and her team have excavated many of the plazas, temples and palaces of the monumental civic area. Surrounding the monuments is the residence that made up the ancient Maya community. Tzunu’un, a residential unit discovered, mapped and tested in 1984, became the focus of a major investigation that excavated, exposed, and consolidated an elite Maya house. This is the only archaeological house that the public has access to today. Working with Master Maya forest gardeners, the team has developed a forest garden around the house site. The forest gardens of El Pilar are now maintained by the Maya farmers as part of the El Pilar Forest Garden Network.

== Conservation and ecotourism ==
The El Pilar Archeological Reserve for Maya Flora and Fauna is open to the public and has a series of trails providing access throughout the site. Tourists can take a taxi from Bullet Tree Falls directly into the Maya site. Intrepid visitors can experience both ancient and contemporary aspects of Maya life promoting Maya culture in the area. There is an active initiative to make El Pilar of Belize and Guatemala the first archaeological peace park in the world. While El Pilar is protected in Belize and Guatemala and rangers are on site, it remains under threat by looters and was placed on the World Monument Fund's 1996 list of 100 Most Endangered Sites in the World. Ford’s conservation strategy, called Archaeology Under the Canopy, promotes the conservation of ancient Maya monuments in the context of their natural environmental context. Sheltered under the forest canopy after 1000 years of neglect, El Pilar and all the Maya monuments are best maintained in the shade. This preserves Maya cultural heritage along with the forest gardens the Maya created.

== Notes ==
- "Maya Forest Garden". The El Pilar Forest Garden Network.
- "Mesoamerican Research Center". MesoAmerican Research Center.
- "Exploring Solutions Past". Exploring Solutions Past.
