= Ivette Perfecto =

Puerto Rican ecologist

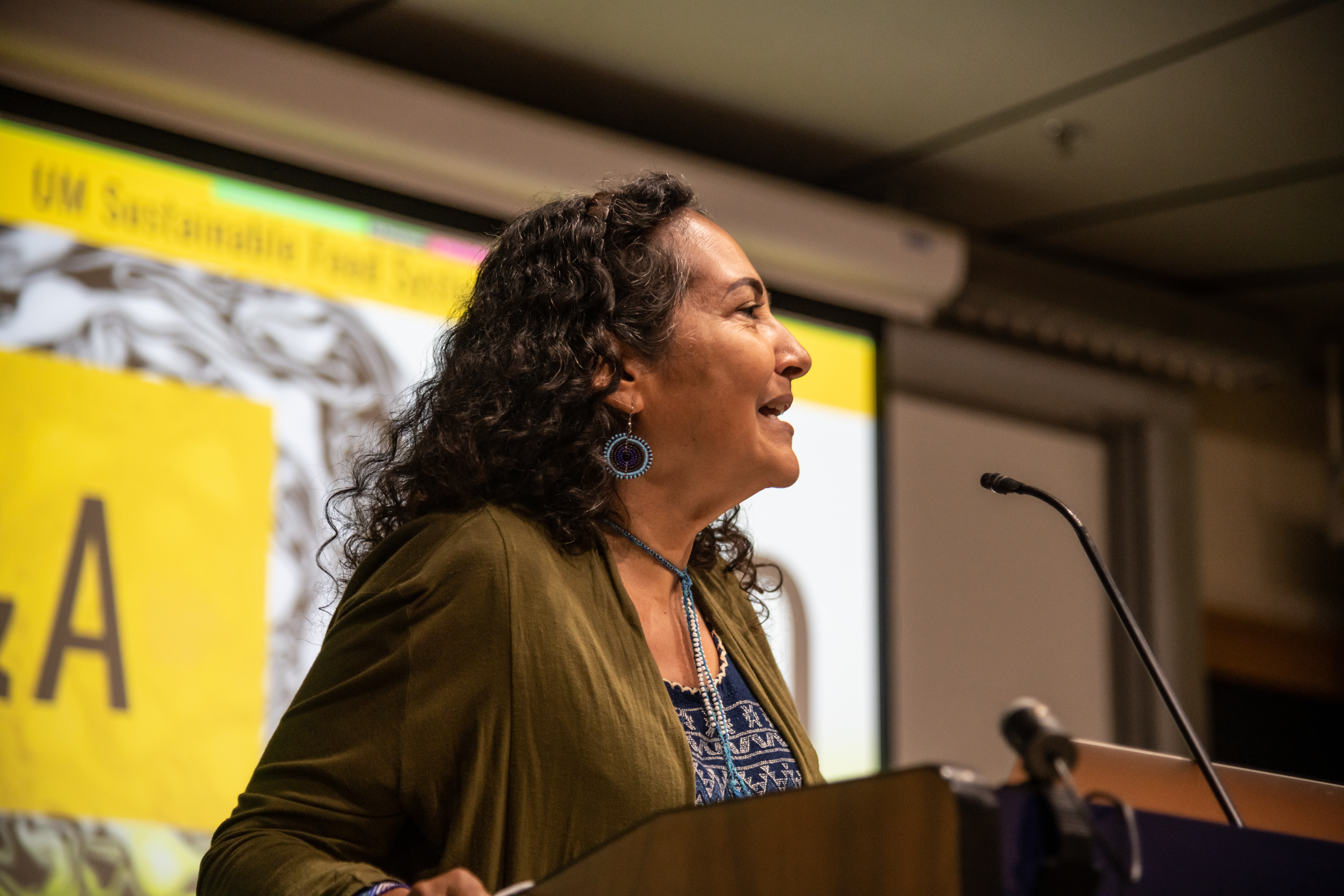
- Perfecto in 2019
- Born: San Juan, Puerto Rico
- Education: Universidad del Sagrado Corazón (B.S.); University of Michigan (Ph.D.)
- Awards: Member of the National Academy of Sciences (2022); Fulbright Scholar (2004-2005)
- Scientific career
- Workplaces: University of Michigan
- Thesis: Ants as biological control agents in the maize agroecosystem in Nicaragua (1989)
- Doctoral advisor: John A. Witter

Ivette Perfecto is an ecologist and professor at the University of Michigan. Her work focuses on complex ecosystem dynamics and the application of ecological theories to agricultural systems.

== Early life and education ==
Ivette Perfecto was born in San Juan, Puerto Rico. As a child, she was fascinated by the environment of the Caribbean. She enjoyed the outdoors, particularly the underwater world she could explore while snorkeling. The interactions she observed between organisms sparked her original interest in biology. However, the contamination of many of Puerto Rico's ecosystems that resulted from the industrialization programs of Operation Bootstrap instilled a passion in Perfecto for environmental sciences. She enrolled in the Universidad Sagrado del Corázon in Santurce, Puerto Rico and graduated with a B.S. of Biology in 1977. After earning an undergraduate degree, Perfecto was accepted as a graduate student at the University of Michigan in Ann Arbor, Michigan. At the time she was a single mother and was often unable to start her work until after she had put her son to bed in the evenings. In 1982 she earned her Masters of Ecology and then returned to Puerto Rico where she taught college biology. She taught biology for a year in Puerto Rico, but her desire to continue conducting research lead her to return to the University of Michigan where she earned a PhD in Ecology and Natural Resources in 1989.

== Career and research ==
Perfecto is a professor in the School for Environment and Sustainability at the University of Michigan and became the George W. Pack Professor of Natural Resources and Environment in 2009. Her work can be generalized under the category of ecology, but specifically she studies agroecology, diversity in coffee agricultural systems, and conservation biology. Some of her major findings have included a better understanding of complex ecosystem dynamics through the analysis of spatial factors and trait mediated effects. Perfecto's research regarding the improvement of agricultural systems through the application of ecological theories is inherently interdisciplinary. It reflects her career as a scientist and efforts as an engaged activist to improve the livelihoods of Puerto Rican agriculturists through research and communication. Her work regarding the role of pest species in agroecosystems has been utilized to the effect that the use of pesticides can be reduced to the benefit of farmers. In addition, Perfecto has researched the effect of shade trees in agroecosystems as a potential alternative to increased irrigation in the face of climatic alterations such as increased temperature and decrease precipitation. Perfecto has a large volume of published books and scientific articles. More than 100 journal publications and articles that she has authored or co-authored have been cited over 27,000 times. She is also one of the founders of Alianza de Mujeres en Agroecología-Alliance of Women in Agroecology.

=== Selected grants ===
- 2018 United States Department of Agriculture-National Institute of Food and Agriculture. Evaluating Hurricane Damage And Resilience In Coffee Agroecosystems In Puerto Rico. Ivette Perfecto John Vandermeer, Javier Lugo.
- 2017 United States Department of Agriculture-National Institute of Food and Agriculture. Understanding Multifunctional Landscapes within the Model Forest of Puerto Rico. Ivette Perfecto John Vandermeer, Javier Lugo.
- 2012 National Science Foundation-Opportunities for Promoting Understanding through Synthesis (OPUS). Ecology and Complexity of the Coffee Farm. Ivette Perfecto & Douglas Levey.

=== Public engagement ===
Perfecto and co-contributors, John Vandermeer and Javier Lugo, were awarded a United States Department of Agriculture-National Institute of Food and Agriculture grant in 2018 assessing the effects of Hurricane Maria on the resiliency of coffee farms in Puerto Rico. Perfecto and Vandermeer also developed a board game called "Azteca-Chess" to improve coffee farmers' understanding of the ecological complexity of their farms. The game incorporates the pests common to coffee farms and is designed to educate players about the beneficial roles these insects can have in a coffee agroecosystem. Through the dissemination of this game, farmers will better understand the interconnected nature of the ecosystems they cultivate and use this knowledge to inform decisions regarding pest management.

== Selected works ==
- Perfecto, I., Rice, R. A., Greenberg, R., & Van der Voort, M. E. (1996). Shade coffee: a disappearing refuge for biodiversity: shade coffee plantations can contain as much biodiversity as forest habitats. BioScience, 46(8), 598-608.
- Tscharntke, T., Clough, Y., Wanger, T. C., Jackson, L., Motzke, I., Perfecto, I., ... & Whitbread, A. (2012). Global food security, biodiversity conservation and the future of agricultural intensification. Biological conservation, 151(1), 53-59.
- Perfecto, I., & Vandermeer, J. (2010). The agroecological matrix as alternative to the land-sparing/agriculture intensification model. Proceedings of the National Academy of Sciences, 107(13), 5786-5791.
- Vandermeer, J. H., & Perfecto, I. (2018). Ecological complexity and agroecology(1st ed.). Abingdon, Oxon: Routledge. doi:10.4324/9781315313696
- Perfecto, Ivette; Vandermeer, John; Wright, Angus (2019-05-31). Nature's Matrix: Linking Agriculture, Biodiversity Conservation and Food Sovereignty. Routledge. ISBN 978-0-429-65028-4.
- Vandermeer, John; Perfecto, Ivette (2013-03-26). Breakfast Of Biodiversity: The Political Ecology of Rain Forest Destruction. Food First Books. ISBN 978-0-935028-45-4.
- Vandermeer, John; Perfecto, Ivette (2017-10-24). Ecological Complexity and Agroecology. Routledge. ISBN 978-1-315-31367-2.

== Selected awards ==
- 2022 Elected to the National Academy of Sciences (United States)
- 2015 Fellow of the Ecological Society of America
- 2012 Three year position with the Scientific Council of the Regional Institute of Biodiversity for Central America and the Dominican Republic.
- 2011 Ecological Society of America Diversity Award by the Education and Human Resources Committee
- 2009 George W. Pack Professorship of Natural Resources and Environment (permanent endowed chair) at the University of Michigan
- 2004-2005 Fulbright Scholar in Brazil

== See also ==
- Media related to Ivette Perfecto at Wikimedia Commons
