= John Vandermeer =

American ecologist, a mathematical ecologist, tropical ecologist and agroecologist

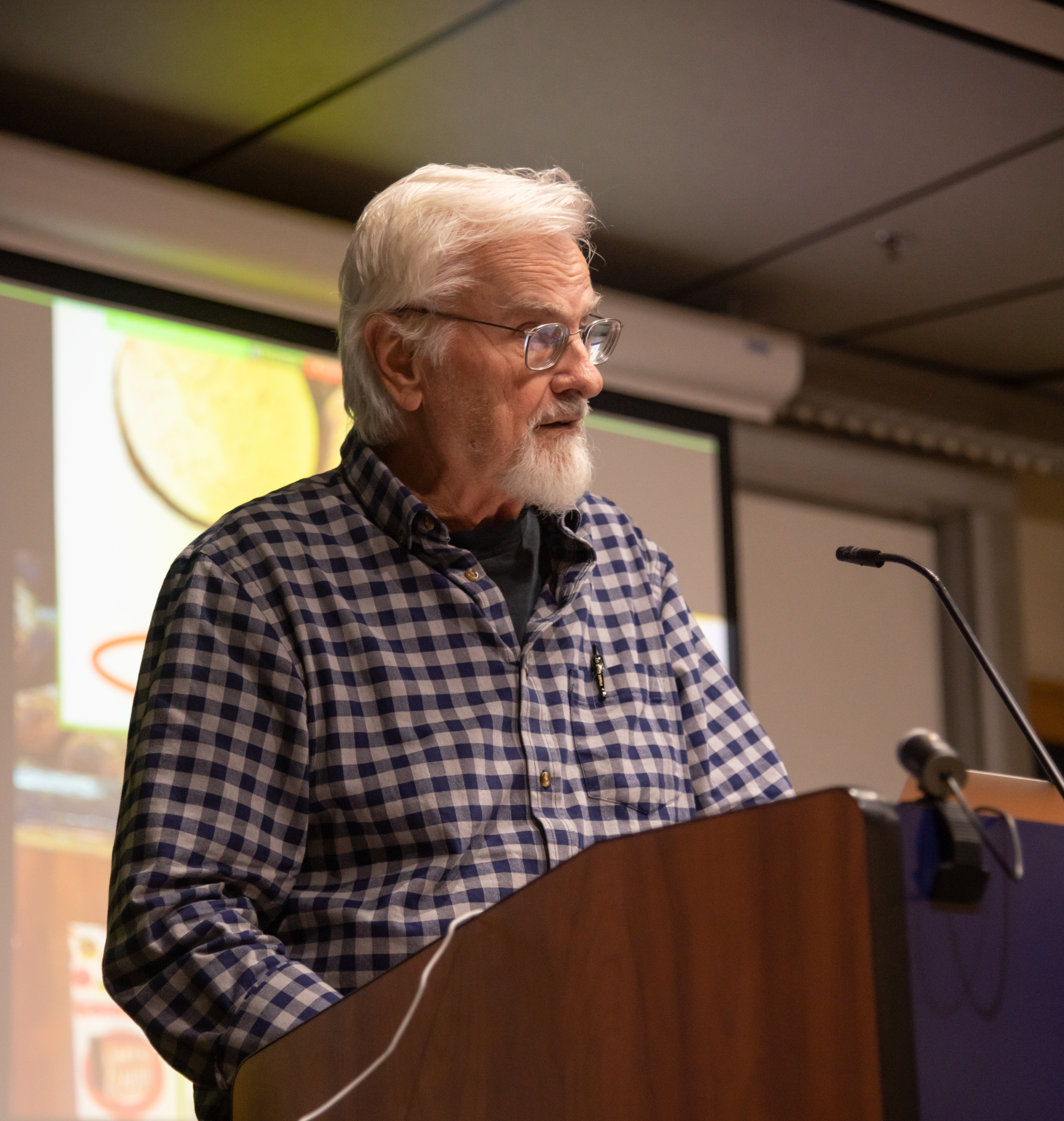
- Vandermeer in 2019
- Born: 1940 (age 85–86); Chicago, Illinois
- Education: University of Michigan (Ph.D.); University of Illinois; University of Kansas
- Scientific career
- Fields: Ecology
- Institutions: University of Michigan
- Thesis: The Structure of Communities as Determined by Competitive Interactions: A Theoretical and Experimental Approach (1968)

John Harry Vandermeer (born 1940) is an American ecologist, a mathematical ecologist, tropical ecologist and agroecologist. He is the Asa Gray Distinguished University Professor of Ecology and Evolutionary Biology and the Arthur F. Thurnau Professor at the University of Michigan, where he has taught since 1971. His research focuses on the ecology of agricultural systems, and he has operated a plot of coffee plants in Mexico for his research for more than fifteen years. In 2016, the symposium "Science with Passion and a Moral Compass" was held to honor his career as a scientist and activist. The symposium, also known as VandyFest, was held in Ann Arbor, Michigan from May 6 to May 8.

== Early life and education ==
Vandermeer was born in 1940 in Chicago, Illinois. He was educated at the University of Illinois, the University of Kansas, and the University of Michigan.

He received his PhD from the University of Michigan in 1969 under the tutelage of Nelson Hairston Sr., with a great deal of additional support from Lawrence Slobodkin. From Michigan he went back to his hometown of Chicago to accept a postdoctoral position in the Committee for Mathematical Biology at the University of Chicago, working with Richard Levins. Much of his later research focused on theoretical mathematical problems in ecology, stemming originally from that post doctoral experience. At that time he also connected with geneticist Richard Lewontin and ecologists Dan Janzen and Monte Lloyd, the latter being co-explorers in several field expeditions for teaching and research in Costa Rica. Subsequently, he accepted a faculty position at SUNY Stonybrook and a year later returned to Michigan as an assistant professor.

== Research and Political Activities ==
The organization Science for the People was formed in 1969 and Vandermeer became an active member, participating in a variety of political and academic activities challenging the nature of science in service of the elites of US and international capital. He has remained active in that organization ever since, forming a local “food and agriculture” subgroup that used an ecological and political lens to examine the global food system.

In 1972/3, he joined with several colleagues including his post doctoral mentor Richard Levins, former students Bill Durham, Katherine Dewey, Steve Risch, Doug Boucher, and Mike Hansen, and long-term colleague Ron Carroll, to establish the study/research/political group “The New World Agriculture Group” (pronounced new ag), later to be transformed into the New World Agriculture and Ecology Group (NWAEG). NWAEG persists to the present (2026) but currently is mainly an e-mail group with occasional meet-ups, not reflective of its earlier years when it engaged in a great deal more political activism. After Nicaragua's Sandinista Revolution in 1979, NWAEG was invited to send a delegation to Managua to negotiate a formal agreement with agencies of the new government to “help develop a sustainable agricultural system for the new government.” Vandermeer and his partner, Ivette Perfecto moved to Nicaragua in 1981 to teach at the national agricultural university (then called ISCA—Instituto de Ciencias Agricolas), where they lived for almost two years. They joined a host of other US citizens who chose to live and work in Nicaragua in support of the new revolutionary government, in direct challenge to the US government's program of destabilization and military confrontation. They helped prepare the monthly newsletter from CUSCLIN (Committee of US Citizens Living In Nicaragua). In addition to teaching courses at the national agricultural university, they mentored several Nicaraguan graduate students, all of whom went on for Doctoral degrees elsewhere. NEWAEG's formal program included sponsorships of more than 20 “cooperants” from several countries that spent several months to years living and working in support of the revolutionary government, and organized many volunteer brigades to create infrastructural projects for the university and other academic/research institutions.

In 1988 Hurricane Joan battered the Caribbean coast of Nicaragua, prompting the local autonomous government to request NWAEG to do a study of its impact and make recommendations about its effect. Vandermeer joined an expedition to the region organized by colleague Katherine Yih. As a result of that expedition, Vandermeer and his partner Ivette Perfecto organized a formal research group, to engage in the long-term study of post-hurricane forest recuperation. Vandermeer and his colleagues Dr. Ivette Perfecto, Dr. Douglas Boucher and Dr. Inigo Granzow de la Cerda contributed to the groundwork that evolved into the university system in the Autonomous Regions of the Atlantic Coast of Nicaragua. Funded partly by the National Science Foundation of the United States, that project expanded to become a field course for mainly Nicaraguan university students and eventually included students from the University of Michigan and elsewhere. The course included lectures about biodiversity/agriculture/politics at the local university in Bluefields (Universidad de la Costa Caribbeño de Nicaragua), followed by a two-week visit to three or four permanent field sites where they engaged students in the research process of measuring various components of forest recovery. That program of yearly expeditions lasted until 1995 and over the course of the years contributed to the literature on tropical forest ecology, as well as stimulated some political writings. His long-term collaboration with a multi-national team of scientists focused on tropical rainforest dynamics after major hurricane disturbance in Nicaragua. Their research provides strong evidence in favor of the assertion that it is the chance to reach a recruitment space into the forest canopy that governs the maintenance of hundreds of tree species and to some lesser extent the multiple tree species competition for nutrients and light. This diverges from tropical tree species niche identity notion thus proposing that the tree species assemblage are to some extent the result of random dispersal and recruitment events.

While teaching a course in applied ecology in the tropics for the Organization for Tropical Studies in Costa Rica, he became interested in the ecology of coffee agroecosystems. Moving on from Costa Rica, in 1990 he began work on Finca Irlanda, an organic coffee farm located in the state of Chiapas, Mexico. Over many years this work contributed to the growing literature on the relationship between agriculture and biodiversity conservation to which he and his partner Ivette Perfecto contributed to substantially. Continuing research in the coffee agroecosystem, he began research in the coffee agroecosytems of Puerto Rico in 2016.

At the University of Michigan as of 2026 he regularly teaches three courses, “Food, Energy, and Environmental Justice”, “The Ecology of Agroecosystems”, and “Complex systems in Ecology” and continues yearly field excursions to Puerto Rico, doing ecological research in the coffee agroecosystem. He is the Asa Gray Distinguished University Professor and Arthur R. Thurnau Professor of Ecology and Evolutionary Biology and a professor in the Program in the Environment at the University of Michigan. He is author or editor of 18 books and over 300 scientific publications. He also remains a political activist, is a founding member of the New World Agriculture and Ecology group, a current member of the revived organization “Science for the People,” a founding member of the University of Michigan “Sustainable Food System Initiative,” an elected fellow of the Ecological Society of America, and an elected fellow of the American Academy of Arts and Sciences. He contributed lectures to both of the Zapatista events “Conciencia” and is an active supporter of the international peasant movement “La Via Campesina.”
