= Biotropica =

- Discipline: Tropical ecology
- Language: English
- Edited by: Jennifer Powers

Publication details
- History: 1966–present
- Publisher: Wiley-Blackwell for the Association for Tropical Biology & Conservation
- Frequency: Bimonthly
- Impact factor: 2.090 (2019)

Standard abbreviations
- ISO 4: Biotropica

Indexing
- CODEN: BTROAZ
- ISSN: 0006-3606 (print); 1744-7429 (web)
- LCCN: 73010234
- JSTOR: 00063606
- OCLC no.: 708279941

Links
- Journal homepage; Online access

Biotropica is a peer-reviewed scientific journal published by Wiley-Blackwell on behalf of the Association for Tropical Biology & Conservation. The journal publishes articles describing original research on the ecology, conservation and management of tropical ecosystems and on the evolution, behavior, and population biology of tropical organisms. According to the Journal Citation Reports, the journal has a 2018 impact factor of 2.989.

Biotropica publishes articles in four categories:

- Insights: Short and highly original articles
- Papers: Longer research articles
- Reviews: Longer synthesis articles
- Commentaries: Opinion or discussion articles
- Annual Award for Excellence in Tropical Biology and Conservation

A small number of book reviews are also published each year, as are occasional "Special Sections" and "Special Issues" comprising articles on a particular theme.

== Origins and History of Biotropica ==
The journal was established in 1969 to replace The Bulletin as the Association for Tropical Biology's primary outlet for research articles. The current editor-in-chief is Jennifer Powers (2020–present). Prior to Powers, the Editors of Biotropica were:

- Emilio M. Bruna (2014–2019)
- Jaboury Ghazoul (2006–2013)
- Robin Chazdon (2004–2005)
- Robert J. Marquis (1997–2003)
- E. Raymond Heithaus (1983–1996)
- Michael Emsley (1973–1982)
- William Stern (1968–1972)

== See also ==
- Revista de Biología Tropical
