= Robin Chazdon =

American tropical ecologist

Robin L. Chazdon
- Born: 1957 (age 68–69); Chicago, Illinois, US
- Spouse: Robert K. Colwell

Academic background
- Education: BA, biology, 1978, Grinnell College; PhD, Ecology and Evolutionary Biology, 1984, Cornell University
- Thesis: Ecophysiology and architecture of three rain forest understory palm species (1984)

Academic work
- Institutions: University of Connecticut

Robin Lee Chazdon (born 1957) is an American tropical ecologist. She is a professor emeritus of ecology and evolutionary biology in the College of Liberal Arts and Sciences at the University of Connecticut.

== Early life and education ==
Chazdon was born in Chicago, Illinois, in 1957. While attending Kenwood High School, she participated on their swimming team. During high school, she became aware of environmental problems and gravitated toward studying ecology. As a result, Chazdon enrolled at Grinnell College with the goal of becoming a plant ecologist and field biologist. She was advised by her academic advisor to join a field study program in Costa Rica, which she did from January–June 1976. Upon graduating from Grinnell College, she received her doctoral degree in Ecology and Evolutionary Biology from Cornell University in 1984. As a graduate student at Cornell, Chazdon completed her dissertation research at La Selva where she focused on understanding how understory palm trees could grow in the deep shade.

== Career ==
Upon earning her PhD, Chazdon completed three post-doctoral fellowships before becoming an assistant professor at the University of Connecticut (UConn) in 1988. She eventually received tenure in 1994 and was promoted to the rank of full professor in 2000. In this role, she served as the president of the Association for Tropical Biology and was a member-at-large to the Governing Board of the Ecological Society of America. In this role, she became a Fulbright Senior Scholar which supported her project titled "Effects of Forest Structure and Canopy Closure on Tree and Sapling Growth in Wet Tropical Forests." During the 2003–2004, Chazdon received the President's Medal from the British Ecological Society and was named UConn's Faculty Member of the Year. She was also named the editor-in-chief of the journal Biotropica after having previously served on the governing board. In 2007, Chazdon collaborated with Brazilian and Mexican researchers to examine the validity of "chronosequence" studies in La Selva.

While serving in these roles, Chazdon began long-term studies on tropical forest regeneration in northeastern Costa Rica and led a 10-year multi-country research project involving long-term ecological studies on tropical forest regeneration in Mexico, Costa Rica, and Brazil. In May 2013, Chazdon was invited to partake in a discussion of tropical forest ecology and climate change with the Royal Society in London. She credited her selection for the committee due to research into tropical forest regrowth and her scholarly book Second Chance: Tropical Forest Regeneration in an Age of Deforestation. Following this, she published her book Second growth: The promise of tropical forest regeneration in an age of deforestation through the University of Chicago Press which was formed as a guide to restoration. Later, Chazdon became the director of the Tropical Reforestation Research Coordination Network (PARTNERS) which aimed to utilize both natural and social sciences to understand drivers and outcomes of deforestation in the tropics. In 2015, Chazdon was awarded a National Geographic Grant titled “Seedling regeneration and tree-frugivore interaction networks during tropical forest regeneration” in Costa Rica.

Chazdon retired from the University of Connecticut in 2016 to become a Research Professor of Tropical Forest Restoration at the University of the Sunshine Coast in Queensland, Australia. Despite leaving the institution, Chazdon remained a professor emeritus of ecology and evolutionary biology in the College of Liberal Arts and Sciences. Since retiring, she began working in public policy with Forestoration International, became a senior fellow for the World Resources Institute's Global Restoration Initiative, and a senior research associate with the International Institute for Sustainability Rio. In 2020, Chazdon was named an honorary fellow of the Association for Tropical Biology and Conservation.

== Personal life ==
Chazdon and her husband Robert K. Colwell have two children together.
