= Andrew Durbin =

American poet, novelist, and editor

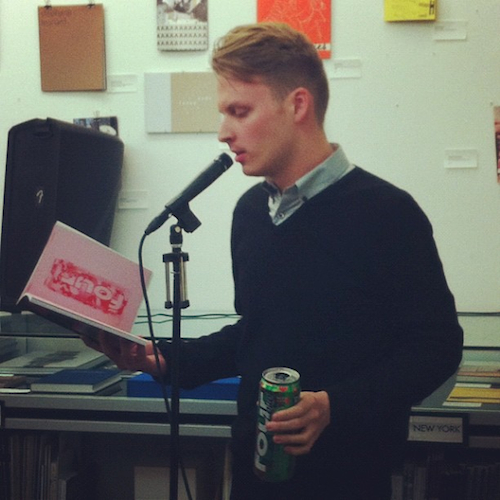
Andrew Durbin

Andrew Durbin is an American poet, novelist, and editor. As of 2019, he has served as editor-in-chief of Frieze. Prior to his position at Frieze, he co-founded Company Gallery, served as the Talks Curator at the Poetry Project, and served as a co-editor at Wonder press. Durbin is the author of two novels and several chapbooks. He lives and works in London.

== Early life and education ==
Durbin was born in Orlando, Florida and raised in South Carolina. He moved to New York in 2008 and studied poetry and classics at Bard College. He graduated in 2011 and subsequently moved to New York City.

== Work ==
Upon arrival to New York, Durbin worked at the Bureau of General Services–Queer Division, curating the Queer Division's reading series. Durbin then went on work at the Poetry Project and served as their Talks Curator. Durbin and poet Ben Fama began a series of nightlife parties called Crush Parties. Upon invitation to the parties, guests were instructed to email the hosts names of their crushes which prompted a second-wave of invitations sent out to the crushes. Durbin also began collaborating with Ben Fama and Trisha Low on a small, independent press called Wonder. Wonder has published books, pamphlets, and limited edition art prints from writers and visual artists such as Kate Durbin, Kevin Killian, Juliana Huxtable, Ariana Reines, and Jacolby Satterwhite.

In 2015, a poem titled, "You've Been Flirting Again," was included in Frank Ocean's zine Boys Don't Cry which accompanied the release of Ocean's second studio album, Blonde. Durbin moderated the Open Score 2016 panel Generation You presented by New Museum and Rhizome.

Durbin has written for numerous print and digital art publications including artforum, BOMB, Texte zur Kunst, and Triple Canopy. He has written art criticism on a number of poets and visual artists including Bernadette Meyer, Robert Glück, Greer Lankton, and Robert Longo. In early November 2017, ARTnews announced that Durbin has been named Senior Editor for the Americas at Frieze. In 2019, Durbin was named editor-in-chief of Frieze.

Durbin edited Kevin Killian's Fascination: Memoirs (Semiotexte, 2018) as well as the chapbook series, Say Bye to Reason and Hi to Everything (Capricious, 2015).

In September 2017, Durbin released his first full-length novel, titled MacArthur Park. The book takes its name from a Donna Summer cover of the song "MacArthur Park". The book's plot loosely follows a fictional poet and art writer living in New York during and after the landfall of Hurricane Sandy in New York City in 2012. Writer Lynne Tillman described it as "a novel of unsparing consciousness that spars with the news and effects of uncontrollable weather."

Durbin's second book of fiction, Skyland, is an "impressionistic novella" that follows a writer on the island of Patmos with his close friend as they attempt to locate a painting made by the French novelist and photographer Hervé Guibert. The Wonderful World That Almost Was, a dual biography of Peter Hujar and Paul Thek written by Durbin, was published in 2026.

== Themes ==
=== Style ===
Durbin writes with "aesthetic disinterest, waning faith, and terminal irony," notes poet Trisha Low. His poems often read as prose and wind up self-consciously adopting many voices, forms, and styles of "non-poetic" writing.

Influences

Durbin has cited a range of influences, such as the New Narrative movement of poetry with writers like Gary Indiana, Bob Glück, Bruce Boone, and Dodie Bellamy; Conceptual writer Robert Fitterman; the work of Language writers Lyn Hejinian and Leslie Scalapino; and writers Chris Kraus, Kathy Acker, and Lynne Tillman. He also cites Eileen Myles' The Importance of Being Iceland as a foundational text for fusing his art writing and poetry with his personal life.

== Selected bibliography ==
- Mature Themes (Nightboat Books, 2014). ISBN 9781937658236.
- MacArthur Park (Nightboat Books, 2017). OCLC 982090502
- Skyland (Nightboat Books, 2020). ISBN 9781643620275.
- The Wonderful World That Almost Was (Farrar, Straus and Giroux, 2026).
