= Margery Kempe (novel) =

1994 novel

- Author: Robert Glück
- Language: English
- Publication date: 1994

Margery Kempe is a 1994 novel by New Narrative founding member Robert Glück. It is a retelling of Margery Kempe's purported writing, The Book of Margery Kempe, through a narrator named Bob who is in love with a man named L. It was republished in 2020 by New York Review Books.

== Background and publication ==
Margery Kempe was a mystic in the 1400s who is purported to have written an autobiography entitled The Book of Margery Kempe. It is sometimes referred to as the first autobiography written in the English language.

Robert Glück published Margery Kempe in 1994 with High Risk Books. It is a work in the New Narrative movement, a collection of experimental writing with queer themes and authors. It is a retelling of The Book of Margery Kempe based on Barry Windeatt's 1985 translation of the text. It centers on its 40-year-old narrator, Bob, who discusses his love of a man named L. in Kempe's style; in some cases, Glück directly quotes from Kempe's writing, though the story itself is set in the twentieth century. Like The Book of Margery Kempe, Glück's novel is mostly focused on the interior life of Bob and the struggles of naming emotions through language.

== Reissue ==
In 2020, New York Review Books reissued the novel; it included a foreword by Colm Tóibín and an afterword by Glück.
