= Conservatory of Flowers =

- Golden Gate Park Conservatory
- U.S. National Register of Historic Places
- California Historical Landmark
- San Francisco Designated Landmark
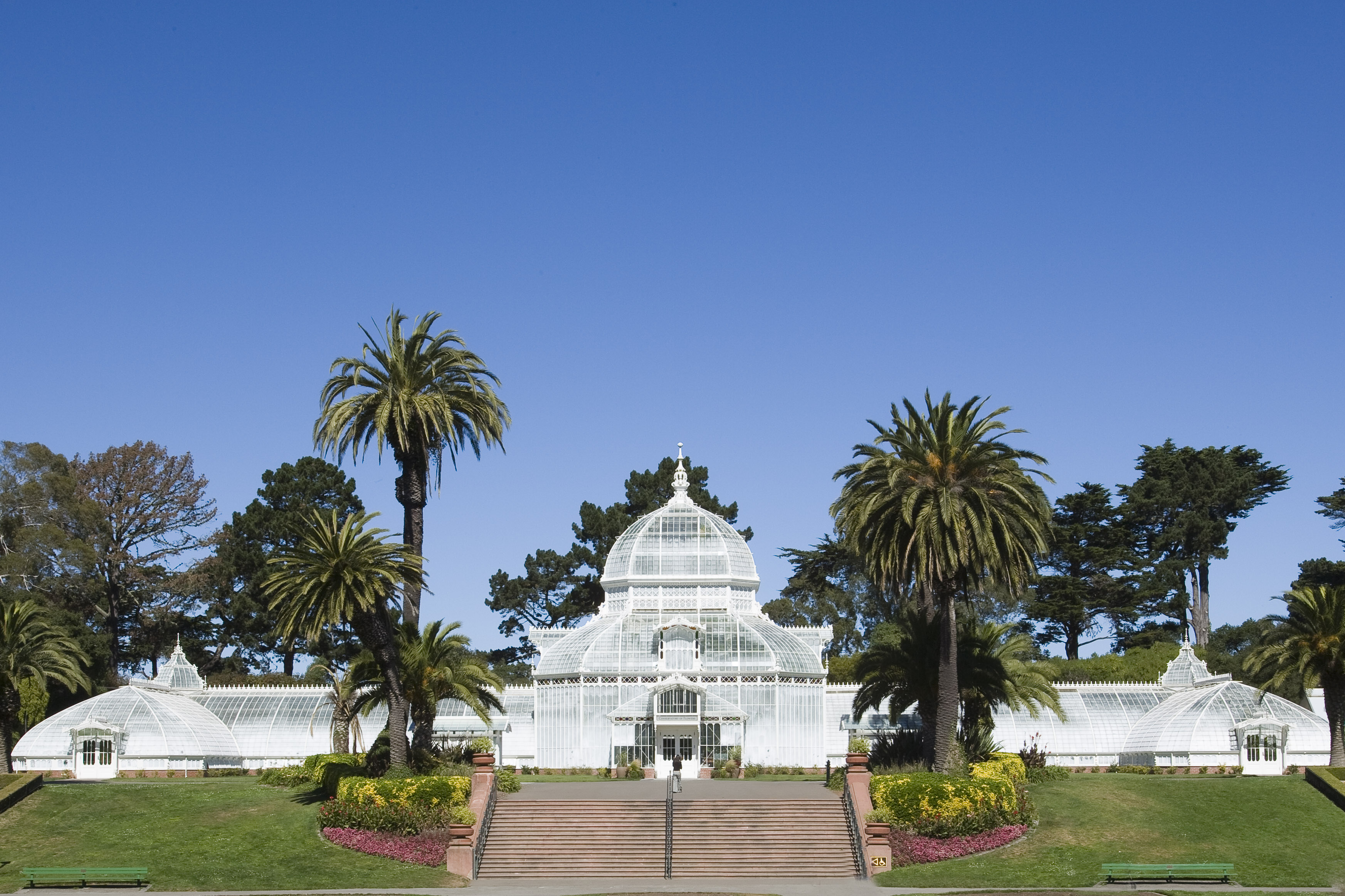
- Interactive map of Golden Gate Park Conservatory
- Location: San Francisco, California
- Coordinates: 37°46′19.2″N 122°27′36″W
- Built: 1878
- Architect: Lord & Burnham
- Architectural style: Italianate, Gothic
- Website: visitgoldengatepark.com/attractions/conservatory-of-flowers/
- NRHP reference No.: 71000184
- CHISL No.: 841
- SFDL No.: 50

Significant dates
- Added to NRHP: October 14, 1971
- Designated CHISL: September 1, 1970
- Designated SFDL: December 4, 1972 (44 Years Ago)

The Conservatory of Flowers is a greenhouse and botanical garden that houses a collection of rare and exotic plants in Golden Gate Park, San Francisco, California. With construction having been completed in 1879, it is the oldest building in the park. It was one of the first municipal conservatories constructed in the United States and is the oldest remaining municipal wooden conservatory in the country. For these distinctions and for its associated historical, architectural, and engineering merits, the Conservatory of Flowers is listed on the National Register of Historic Places and the California Register of Historical Places. It is a California Historical Landmark and a San Francisco Designated Landmark.

The Conservatory of Flowers is now one of the three locations of the Gardens of Golden Gate Park, along with the Japanese Tea Garden and the San Francisco Botanical Garden.

== Architectural description ==
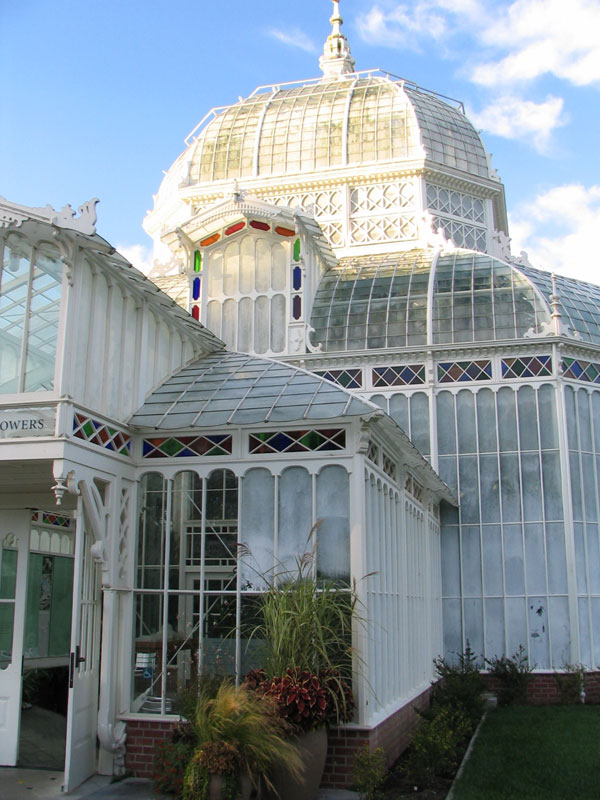
Front entrance of the conservatory in 2006

The Conservatory of Flowers is an elaborate Victorian greenhouse with a central dome rising nearly 60 feet (18 m) high and arch-shaped wings extending from it for an overall length of 240 feet (73 m). The building sits atop a gentle slope overlooking Conservatory Valley. The structural members are articulated through one predominant form, a four-centered or Tudor arch.

The Conservatory of Flowers consists of a wood structural skeleton with glass walls set on a raised masonry foundation. The entire structure has a shallow E-shaped plan that is oriented along an east–west axis. The central 60-foot (18 m) high pavilion is entered through a one-story, glassed-in vestibule with a gable roof on the south side of the pavilion. Flanking the rotunda to the east and west are one-story, symmetrical wings framed by wood arches. Each wing is L-shaped in plan, with cupolas adorning the intersection of the two segments.

The octagonal pavilion supports an arched roof that is, in turn, surmounted by a clerestory and dome. The clerestory is supported by eight free-standing, wood-clad, cast-iron columns located within the rotunda and grouped in pairs. Projecting from the pavilion roof on the east, west, and south elevations are dormer windows with peak roofs. Between major arched structural framing members are wood muntins that hold the glass lights on their sides. The lights lap one over one another like shingles and follow the curve of the arches.

The Lowlands Gallery

The construction of each arch is aesthetically appealing in its simplicity, but also structurally clever in that it takes maximum advantage of wood as a building material while overcoming its inherent structural shortcomings. From a structural perspective, the arch design uses the mechanical properties of the material. Wood is strongest along the length of the grain and weakest along the end grain. The use of short arch components with shallow radii minimized the amount of weaker-end grain exposed to structural forces. The assembly of the arch with several small pieces of wood, the shapes of which are identical from arch to arch, was efficient. It allowed the fabricator to set machines with guides and templates so that cutting the multiple-arch components was a simple task. Furthermore, the design required little material, since each individual arch component has only a shallow radius. Moreover, by using relatively narrow widths of lumber, the chance of warping was minimized. Finally, there was an efficiency realized in transportation, as the small size of the arch components allowed them to be easily stored and shipped.

The structural wood arches and their method of construction, along with the decorative woodwork and unique lapped glazing, define the character of the conservatory. The major character-defining elements consist of ornamental and structural woodwork, including the method of fabrication used for the arches, the lapped glazing system, the ventilation system, and the building's siting and exterior landscaping.

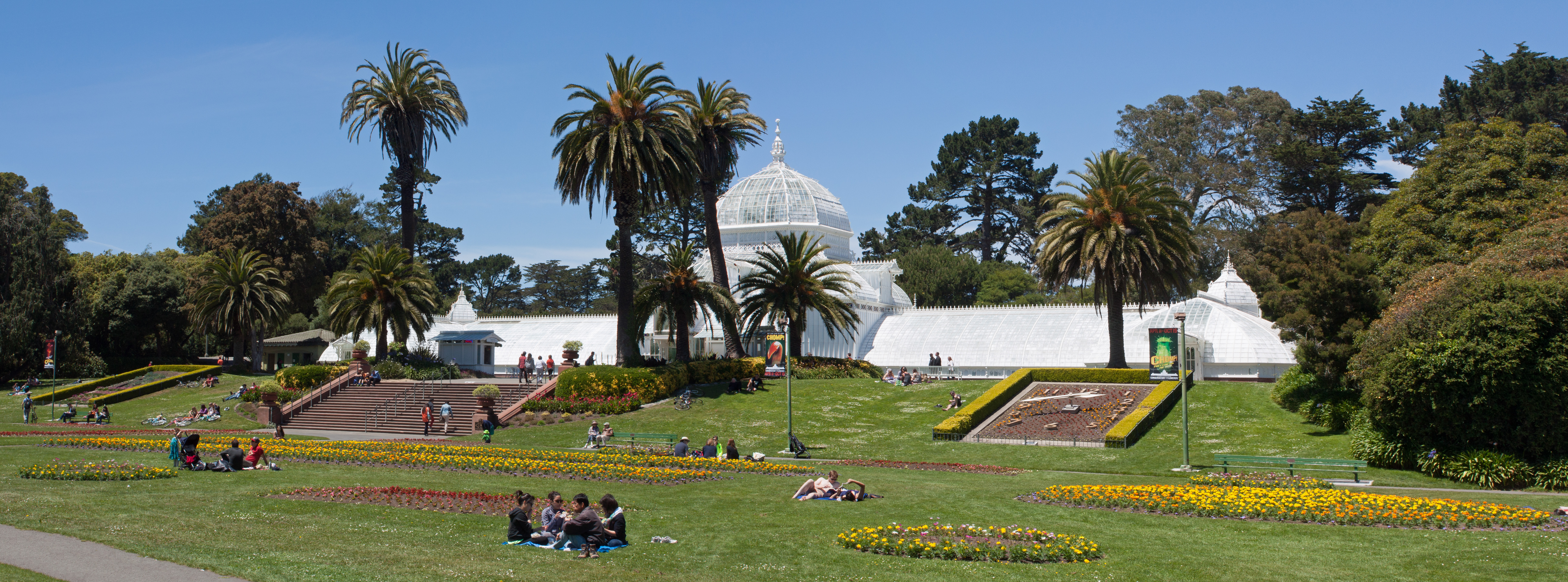
Grounds and greenhouse

=== Rooms within the conservatory ===
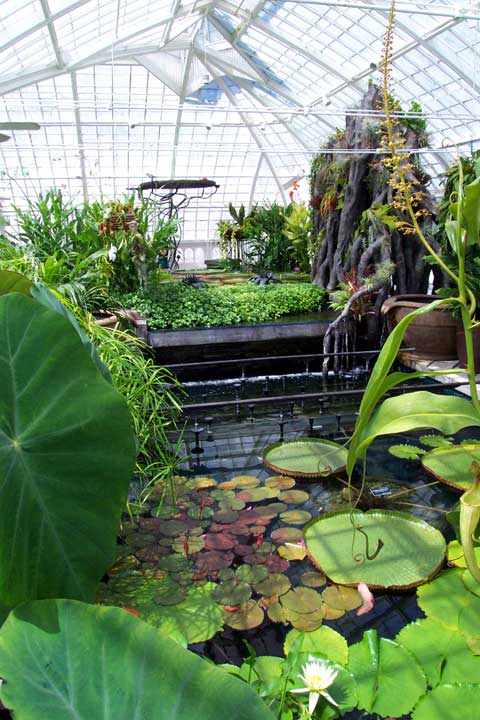
The Aquatic Plants room with flowing water, carnivorous plants, and some giant Victoria lilies

- Potted Plants Gallery: The Potted Plant room holds various unusual plants. The pots and urns that hold the plants were created by various artists from around the world. This room is maintained at hotter temperatures to accommodate the needs of the plants. The Potted Plant Gallery follows Victorian architecture and the 19th century idea of displaying tropical plants in non-tropical parts of the world.
- Lowlands Gallery: The Lowlands Gallery contains plants from the tropics of South America (near the equator). This room also contains plants that produce more well-known products such as bananas, coffee, and cinnamon. The room is usually kept around 70 °F with a very high level of humidity through the use of a frequent system of misters, as the Lowland Tropics typically get 100–400 inches of rain each year and are located in elevations from 3,000 feet to sea level.
- Highlands Gallery: The Highlands Gallery contains native plants from South to Central America. Its plants collect moisture from the air, and from water that drips from the trees above. Due to its drastically higher elevation (3,000–10,000 feet), this room is kept cooler than the Lowlands Gallery (around 65 °F) and is kept at a very high level of humidity through the use of a misting system, as the Highland Tropics typically receive 200 inches of rain per year.
- Aquatics Gallery: The Aquatic Plants room is similar in conditions as those near the Amazon River. As such, many carnivorous plants that thrive in hot, humid environments grow throughout the room. The soil is mostly lacking in nutrients and the carnivorous plants are kept very moist by condensation of the water in the extremely humid air. The room also contains two large ponds, one holding 9,000 gallons of water, and the other holding half as much. Both ponds are kept at 83 °F and are maintained using beneficial bacteria, filters, water heaters, and solutions to prevent algae buildup.

== History and construction ==
=== Historical context ===
In both Europe and America, the 19th century brought increased urbanization and industrialization. In response, city governments began providing open spaces and natural settings for public use. The profession of Landscape Architecture expanded during the later part of the 19th century, and park design became a large part of this new profession's repertoire. In addition, a significant outgrowth of the need for natural surroundings in urban contexts was an increase in the study of plant sciences during this period, both by professionals and amateurs. A building type called the glasshouse or conservatory took shape, in which the city-dweller could view masterpieces of the plant world otherwise unavailable in urban environments. Municipalities and individuals spent a great deal of time and money to construct these building types, which became known as "theaters of nature."

The 19th-century glasshouse grew out of the city-dweller's desire to bring nature and the natural into urban life. These structures became popular in urban, public, and semi-public settings. As these structures gained popularity in Europe, greenhouses began to be constructed on larger scales and of stronger materials. One engineer, Joseph Paxton (1803–1865), had an enormous effect on the development of the conservatory building type. His structures called for a system of glass and metal roof construction, whereas past structures had typically been constructed of wood and glass. His choice of materials allowed designs for glasshouses of substantially larger scales. His best known example is the Crystal Palace at the world's first International Exhibition in 1851. Elsewhere in Europe, Hector Horeau designed several conservatories of glass and iron, such as the Lyons Conservatory in France of 1847. In Germany, August von Voit designed the Great Palm House in the Old Botanical Gardens in Munich in 1860. Another prominent example is the Palm House in the Royal Botanic Gardens, Kew in London.

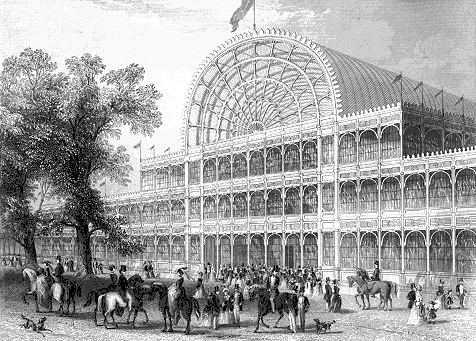
The engineering of the Crystal Palace allowed much larger greenhouses to be constructed.

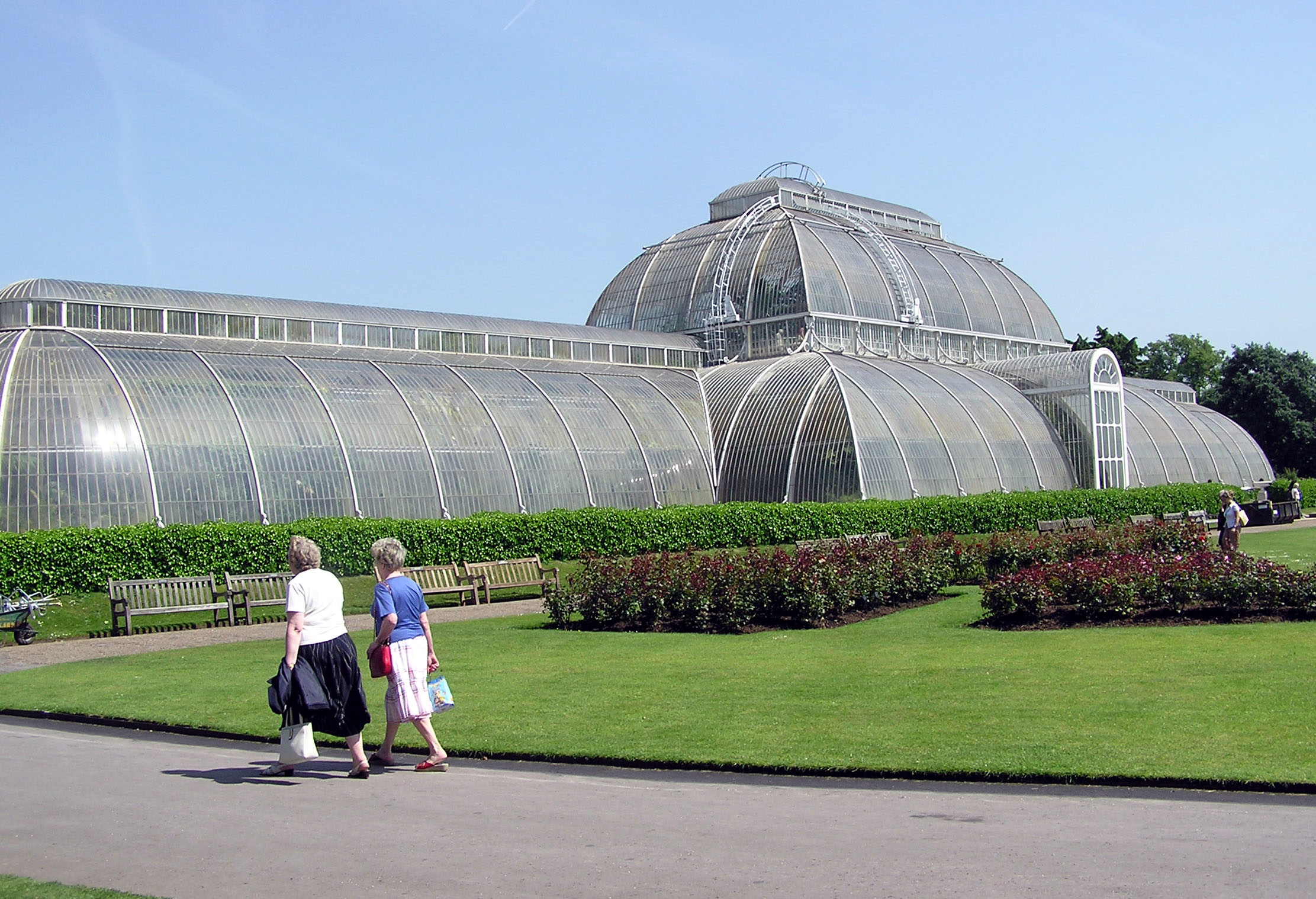
The Kew Gardens Palm House has been described as the inspiration for the Conservatory of Flowers.

The increased use of glass and iron as building materials also impacted the development of the glasshouse. The decades following the construction of the Crystal Palace saw a decline in the use of wood structural members for the construction of large European greenhouses or conservatories. Many manufacturers had found that the humid heat necessary to successfully propagate numerous plant varieties often destroyed wood structural members in short periods of time.

Following European fashions, wealthy Americans began to construct conservatories in the mid-19th century on private estates.

These structures were enjoyed by a broad cross-section of the public and were popular throughout California's early history. Structures of various shapes and sizes were built in Victorian California, ranging from an attached and glassed-in wing for a residence, to a great domed or compartmentalized, detached glasshouse. Examples of wealthy Californians who built conservatories in their private estates include: A.K.P. (Albion Keith Paris) Harmon, for his Oakland Lake Merritt Estate (which later became Lakeside Park); Frederick Delger; Frank M. Smith; Darius Ogden Mills (Millbrae); and Luther Burbank, for his own experiments with plant germination (Santa Rosa). These examples all used wood as structural members.

=== The conservatory ===
The material for two 12,000 square feet (1,100 m^{2}) conservatories modeled after Kew Gardens in London was originally bought in 1876 by James Lick, an eccentric businessman, piano maker, and successful real estate investor who was a patron of the sciences. It is believed that Lick purchased the materials from Lord & Burnham, a manufacturer of greenhouses located in upstate New York, and these were sent in kit form, to be assembled on site. The order is said to have been the company's first big sale. The 33 tons of glass were sent by boat – most probably one chartered by Lick – from New York, around Cape Horn to San Francisco Bay.

The conservatories were intended for the City of San Jose, where Lick had built a mansion surrounded by exotic plants imported from South America and around the world. Lick died in 1876 before constructing the conservatory on his estate, and it was put up for sale by his trustees. The material ended up in the possession of various beneficiaries of Lick's will, the California Academy of Sciences, and the Society of California Pioneers. In 1877, the Society sold it to "a group of 27 prominent San Franciscans and local philanthropists", which included Leland Stanford, Charles Crocker, Claus Spreckels and former mayor William Alvord, who offered it as a gift to the City of San Francisco for use in Golden Gate Park, which was then under construction. The Parks Commission accepted the gift and in 1878 hired Lord & Burnham to supervise the erection of the structure. It is believed that the glass for the second conservatory may have been used in other structures in the park. Records indicate the construction costs were roughly $30,000.

The specific architect of the greenhouse is not known for certain. The San Francisco Public Library holds a document entitled Information about Samuel Charles Bugbee, written by a relative, Arthur S. Bugbee, in 1957. It indicates that the architect Samual Charles Bugbee, whose works included the homes of Leland Stanford and Charles Crocker and the Mendocino Presbyterian Church, may also have designed the Conservatory of Flowers.

Once open in April 1879, the Conservatory contained a large variety of rare and tropical plants, including a giant water lily (Victoria regia), which at the time was the only known specimen in the United States.

==== Wood vs. iron ====
The Conservatory of Flowers was constructed of wood rather than iron, as was common in the later part of the 19th century, because wood was plentiful in the west. Cast-iron greenhouses do not appear to have been widely manufactured in America until the 1880s. Materials analysis suggests that the structural wooden members of the Conservatory greenhouse were constructed of indigenous California Coast Redwood.

Other known American wood conservatories of this period included Lyndhurst in Tarrytown, New York. The Lyndhurst Conservatory, constructed in 1869 of wood by the estate's first owner George Merritt, was destroyed by fire in 1880. The estate's second owner, Jay Gould, rebuilt the conservatory in 1881, hiring the local firm of Lord & Burnham – which had moved from upstate New York to Irvington, New York to be closer to its Hudson Valley clientele, to manufacture his greenhouse. The 1881 Lord & Burnham structure was composed primarily of cast iron and glass. The Gould Conservatory at Lyndhurst is credited with being the first conservatory of iron in the United States and with inspiring subsequent structures of the same material. After their success with the Gould Conservatory of 1881, Lord & Burnham and other conservatory manufacturers apparently produced few large conservatories of wood.

The Conservatory is now the oldest wood-and-glass conservatory in North America open to the public.

=== Statistics ===
The conservatory has 16,800 window panes. The upper dome of the conservatory weighs 14.5 tonnes.

Langley's San Francisco Directory for the Year Commencing April 1879 discussed the construction of the Conservatory of Flowers:

The whole building required in its construction twenty-six thousand square feet of glass weighing twenty-five tons, and two tones of putty. It is a marvel of architectural beauty, surpassing in this respect any similar construction in the United States, and is only equaled in size by the Government Conservatory of in the Horticultural Gardens at Washington.

== Repair campaigns ==
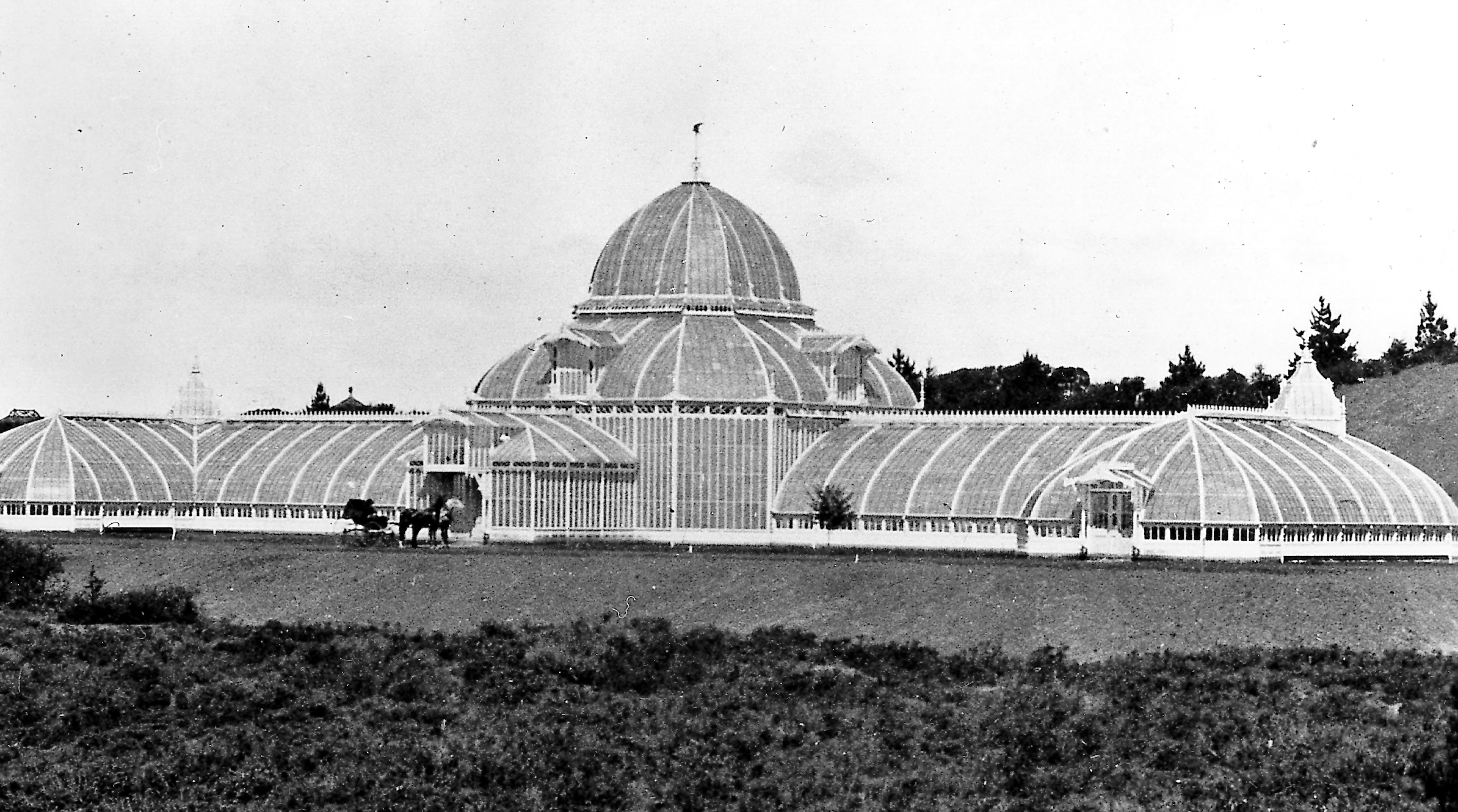
The conservatory, as it appeared in 1879, before its dome was replaced following the 1883 fire

Through its life, the Conservatory of Flowers has undergone several repair campaigns. The Palm Room, located in the center of the building, was seriously damaged in a fire in 1883. Its dome was completely reconstructed at this time. It sustained little damage following the 1906 earthquake. After a second fire damaged the structure in 1918, repairs were made as needed but were not thoroughly documented. No significant documented repairs to the building took place again until sometime after World War II, when certain portions of the wood work, including structural elements, were replaced. In 1959, wood windows at the base of the glazed walls at the building's perimeter were infilled with concrete panels that were cast to match the profiles of the original construction. In 1964–65, the clerestory of the Palm Room underwent reconstruction. The columns, lintels, and sills in this area were replaced by pressure-treated redwood. Five hundred lineal feet of the exterior cap molding, which covers the arches, was replaced at this time as well. Between 1978 and 1982, major repairs were performed on deteriorated woodwork. The areas that were repaired during this time did not overlap the 1960s' repairs to the clerestory.

In general, it appears that after 1914 most maintenance work was undertaken only when conditions presented a safety hazard, mechanical systems were in need of repair, or the building became extremely unsightly. Lack of scheduled maintenance affects the performance of building materials. Wood, in particular, requires proper maintenance of paint coatings to control the development of rot. In this building, it is important to maintain the condition of the interior, as well as exterior, coatings because of the humid indoor environment. Also necessary is the maintenance of waterproofing details, such as flashing, to prevent water from accumulating in concealed areas. It is therefore not surprising that rot developed in the building, and significant repairs to the wood elements of the building were necessary over time, given its somewhat irregular maintenance history.

=== Early years ===
In the first years after the conservatory was constructed, ongoing maintenance was necessary for both the structure and its collection. This included repairing the boilers in the furnace room, the installation of ventilators, and the installation of a cement floor. At this point, the conservatory held over 9,000 plants of various kinds.

=== 1883 fire ===
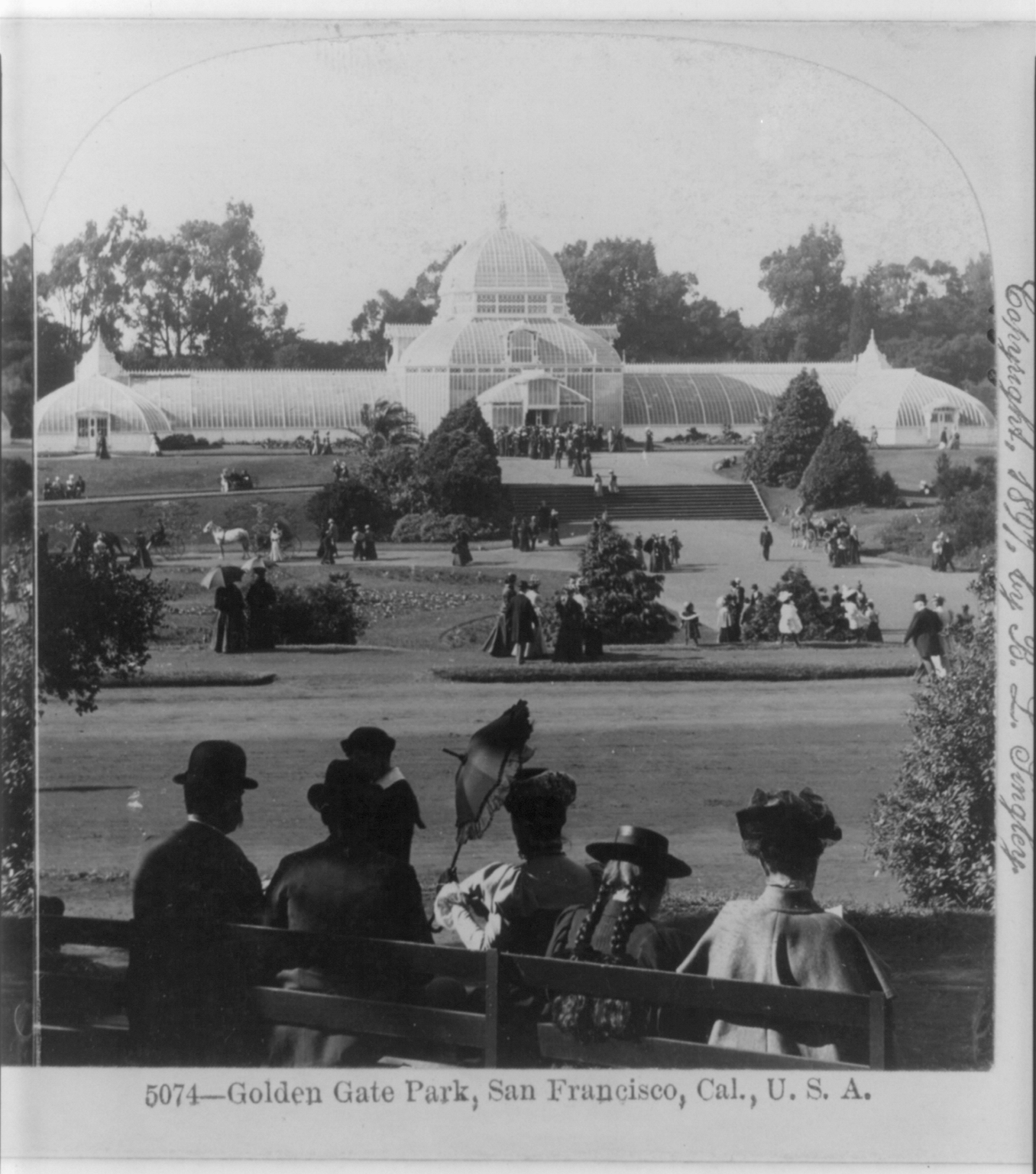
The conservatory in 1897

In January 1883, the conservatory caught fire, with the main dome sustaining the heaviest damage. Evidence suggests the fire started as the result of intense heat generated by the furnace. Charles Crocker donated $10,000 toward the repair fund. The reconstructed dome included the addition of a clerestory. The original dome was saucer-shaped, while the replacement dome was more classically domical in its appearance, and was raised by 6 feet (1.8 m). The other major change was the finial, which prior to the fire consisted of an eagle figure, whereas the replacement feature is a traditional turned finial of wood. This has been the only major change in the overall form of the building during its lifetime.

=== The remainder of the nineteenth century ===
Records indicate ongoing maintenance included painting in 1887–1889 and repainting again in 1890. In 1894, the conservatory's surrounding landscaping saw numerous transformations in preparations for the California Midwinter International Exposition of 1894. Another fire struck the building in 1895.

The conservatory again was repainted in 1899 and received new floors of grooved concrete. At this point, the old floors, some of wood and some of concrete, were replaced by new grooved concrete. The grooves in the floor were intended to carry off the surplus water and make a visit to the conservatory more comfortable and pleasant. Several wooden plant benches that had rotted out were replaced by benches made of concrete wire netting to stand the constant change of temperature better than wood.

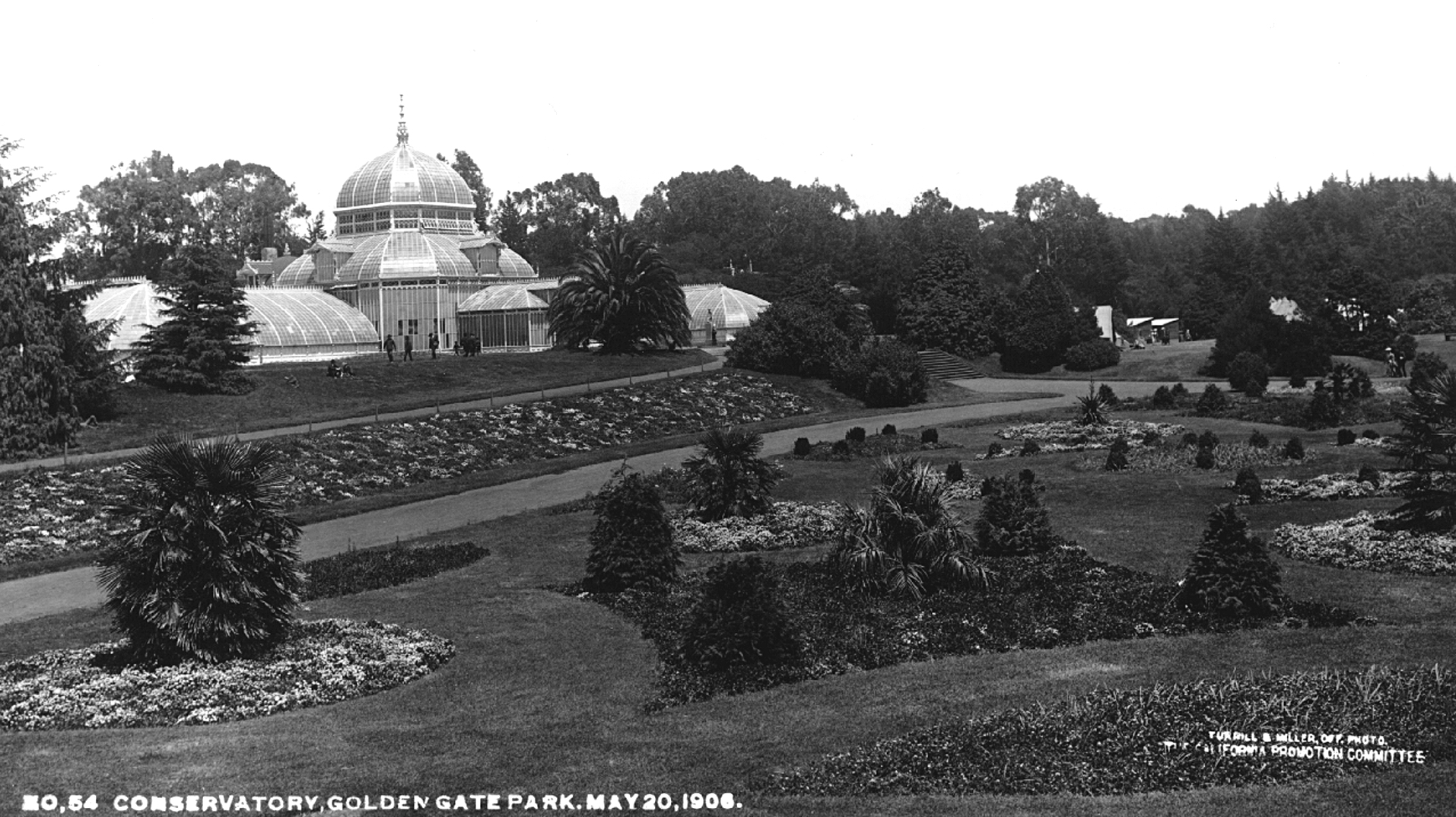
The conservatory, one month after the 1906 San Francisco earthquake

=== The 1906 earthquake ===
The San Francisco earthquake and fire of 1906 did little damage to the Conservatory of Flowers. The structure is visible in a number of photographs of refugees living in Golden Gate Park after the disaster. However, records indicate that reconstruction costs ensued to the surrounding landscape from refugees living in the park.

=== Early twentieth-century repairs ===
Minor repairs were made to the Conservatory of Flowers in 1912 and 1913, including carpentry, cement setting for plant benches, and other small repairs. In 1918 a fire, commencing in the furnace room, caused damage to the conservatory's Potting Room and adjacent Dome Room. Repairs were made as needed. Another fire struck the Conservatory in 1918, causing the roof to partially collapse.

=== Depression Era decline ===
During the Depression, the Conservatory of Flowers, due to apparent lack of maintenance, was in poor condition. The Park commissioners instructed the superintendent of Parks to close the Conservatory of Flowers in 1933 and construct proper barricades to prevent possible injury to citizens. The woodwork, foundations, girders, posts, and various structural members became rotted and decayed to such an extent that certain portions of the conservatory were reported to be in danger of falling and potentially causing great injury.

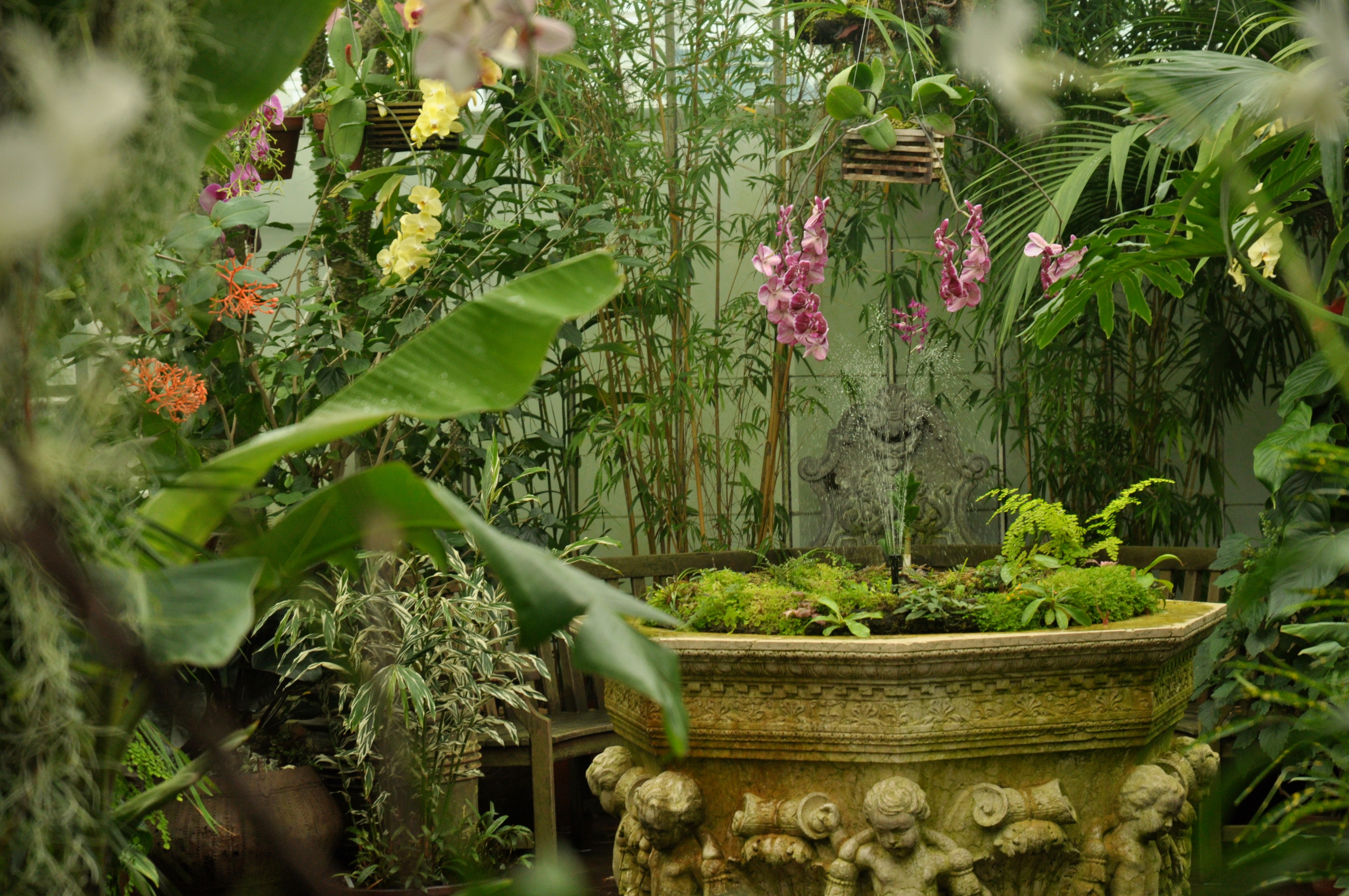
Orchids

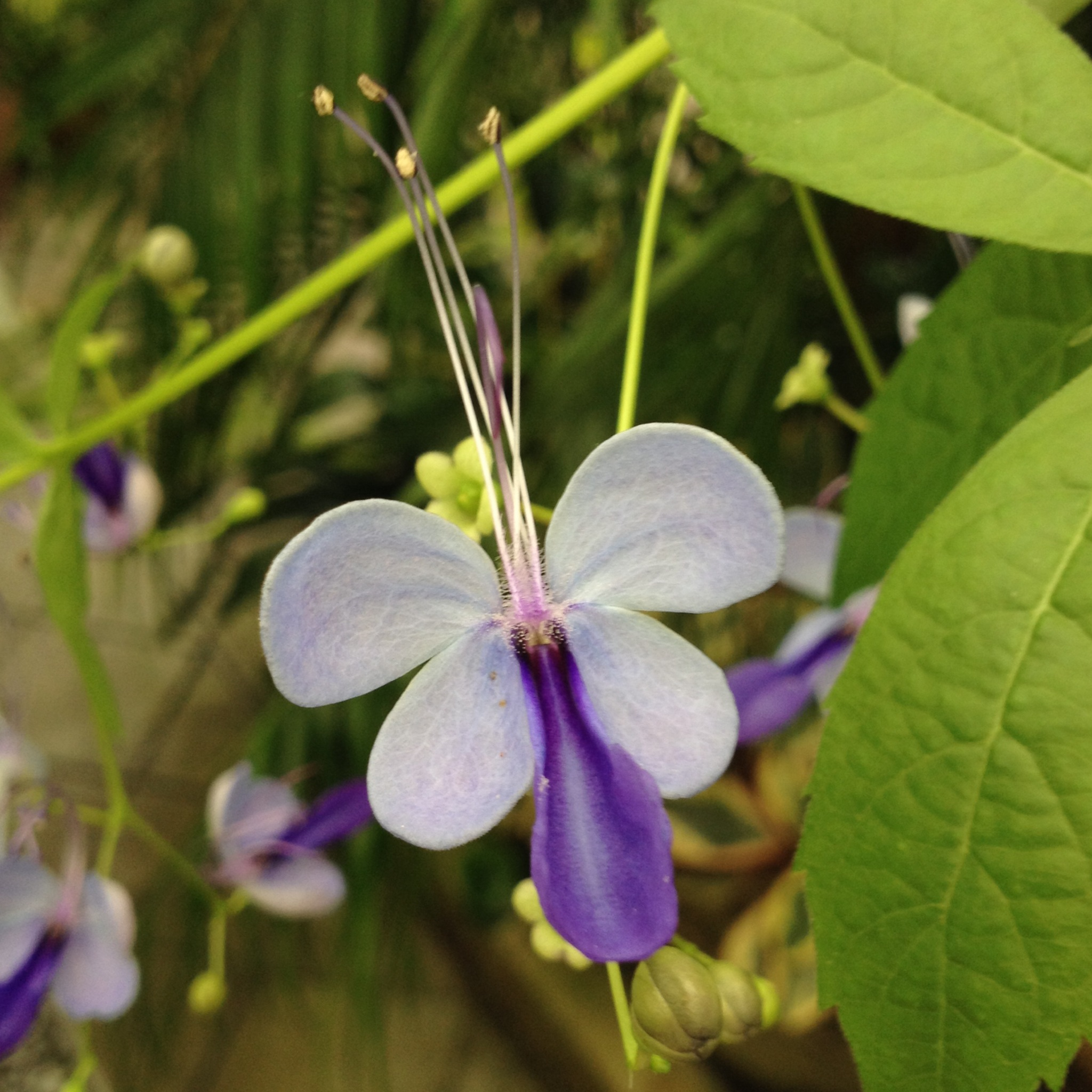
Clerodendrum ugandense, blue butterfly bush

=== Post-War era ===
In August 1946, the Conservatory of Flowers was painted and reglazed. A new electrical system, which allowed automatic control of the heating system for all of the conservatory, was installed in 1948. New piping was installed in 1949. A new water supply was installed in 1956.

In 1959, the original doors at the wing entrances were replaced with plate-glass windows and concrete panels. That same year, the lower ventilators at the building's perimeter were removed, and concrete panels, cast in the profile of the ventilators, were installed. This unfortunately seriously compromised the building's natural ventilation system. A few minor repairs were made in 1962 and 1965.

The Conservatory of Flowers was added to the National Register of Historic Places on October 14, 1971. It had previously been named a California Historic Landmark on September 1, 1970, and would be designated a San Francisco Landmark on December 4, 1972.

A major rehabilitation project took place between 1978 and 1981. Work included the removal of all interior and exterior caps of the arches for visual inspection and probing, in order to detect pockets of wood rot. The portions of arches showing surface wood rot were treated with 'Git-Rot', a wood preservative. The caps that remained in good condition were salvaged and reinstalled.

Building evidence suggests that the exterior surfaces of the arches were originally fitted with copper flashing. The flashing was secured onto the arches and covered by the wood caps. In most locations that were inspected, the flashing had been removed, leaving only short remnants at random locations. The flashing was rolled up and taken away during the 1982 restoration effort. The flashing was an effective method of preventing moisture from entering the joints in the arch assembly, and its removal hastened deterioration. During this restoration as well, various deteriorated wood elements were replaced with pressure-treated, glue-laminated members.

== Millennium rehabilitation ==
During the winter of 1995–1996, a series of large storms exacerbated the ongoing deterioration of the wood structure. The 100 mph (160 km/h) winds blew out 30,000 fogged white glass panes in the conservatory, shattered the white glass dome, and weakened the structure. In addition, 15 percent of the plant collection was lost due to exposure to the cold, wintry air and flying glass. After covering the holes with tarp and plywood and bringing in heaters, the conservatory contemplated farming out hundreds of plants to other institutions while the building was repaired. Some specimens however were too big or too old to move. The most challenging plant was the 112-year-old Brazilian philodendron that inhabited the shattered dome. A greenhouse was built to house the philodendron and other plants during renovation and afterwards used for expansion and keeping more exotic plants.

The conservatory was placed on the 1996 World Monuments Watch by the World Monuments Fund. The Fund aimed to encourage repair rather replacement of the original fabric, and provided funding from financial services company American Express. Additional funding came from the Richard & Rhoda Goldman Fund. In 1998, the National Trust for Historic Preservation adopted the conservatory into its Save America's Treasures program, launched as part of First Lady Hillary Clinton's Millennium Council projects. The publicity from these efforts eventually led to a fundraising campaign organized by what would become the San Francisco Parks Alliance to raise the money needed for rehabilitation, restoration, and stabilization of the conservatory.

The construction lasted from 1999 until 2003. Initially estimated to cost $10 million, the actual final cost was $25 million. On September 20, 2003, the restored conservatory was once again opened to the public.

=== Repair methodology ===
Between November 1996 and January 1997, on-site surveys were conducted by a project team consisting of Tennebaum-Manheim Engineers and Architectural Resources Group. Surveyors included architects, materials conservators, architectural historians, structural engineers, mechanical engineers, and electrical engineers. The architectural and materials condition survey included a close-range visual inspection of all of the wood members in the building to determine locations of deteriorated wood, an analysis of the types of wood species occurring in the building, a study of the building's construction details, glazing, and a photographic survey. The structural survey included measuring the deflection of each of the arches and studying the probable lateral and vertical load paths to determine areas of weakness.

=== Survey findings ===
The deterioration of wood occurred at typically vulnerable areas, such as the exposed end grain of arches and muntins and where wood members intersect. The humidity in the building was a contributing factor to wood deterioration. The level of moisture in the building was exacerbated by two conditions. First, the building's natural ventilation system had been removed in a past repair. The ventilators, which were originally located in the low wall area, had been filled in, and some ridge ventilators were inoperable. The air flow through the ventilators, which would have assisted in the evaporation of water, was not occurring. Second, the penetration of rain water from the exterior of the building, because of inadequate or deteriorated waterproofing, had increased the level of moisture in the wood. The copper sheathing that had originally capped the arch exteriors, in addition to acting as a moisture barrier, may have been acting as a biocide through copper oxides inhibiting wood rot.

=== Repair process ===
Due to the level of deterioration and concerns relating to the building's long-term maintenance, a scheme was used to restore the wood structure. This involved disassembling the structure, repairing salvageable materials, and replacing materials deteriorated beyond repair with old-growth redwood that had fallen naturally or had been left behind by loggers. This was possible due to the original method used to fabricate the structure.

The construction sequence was as follows. First, temporary protection for those plants that could not be moved was provided. Then, the glass was carefully removed from the building, and historic glazing was salvaged. Structural wood elements of the building (arches), as well as muntins that held the glazing, were disassembled. The location of each element was recorded for reinstallation. The lead-based coatings were stripped from the wood members. Each wooden piece was then tested for its strength and determined if repair or replacement was appropriate.

== Contemporary status ==
In January 2022, legislation was proposed by Mayor London Breed that would put the Conservatory under the oversight of the San Francisco Botanical Garden Society, along with the Japanese Tea Garden and the Botanical Garden itself, under the name "The Gardens of Golden Gate Park". Under the proposal, admission to the gardens would be free for San Francisco Residents.

== Appearances in film ==
- Vertigo directed by Alfred Hitchcock (1958);
- One on Top of the Other directed by Lucio Fulci (1969);
- Innerspace directed by Joe Dante (1987);
- Heart and Souls directed by Ron Underwood (1993);
- Playing Mona Lisa directed by Matthew Huffman (2000)

== Appearances in literature ==
- "About Ed" by Robert Glück (2023) is a biography of Conservatory gardener Ed Aulerich-Sugai

== See also ==
- 49-Mile Scenic Drive
- Desert Garden Conservatory (San Marino, California)
- List of botanical gardens in the United States
- List of San Francisco Designated Landmarks
- Sunnyside Conservatory
