= San Francisco Columbarium & Funeral Home =

Cemetery in San Francisco, California, USA

San Francisco Columbarium
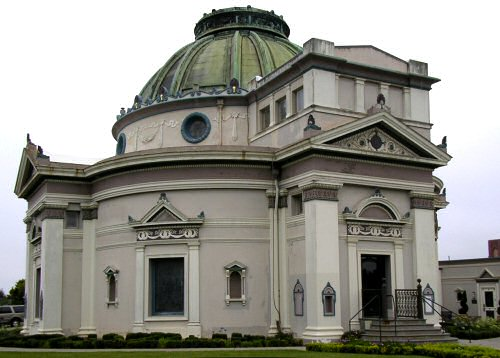
- Interactive map of San Francisco Columbarium

Details
- Established: 1898
- Location: One Loraine Court; San Francisco, California
- Country: United States
- Coordinates: 37°46′50″N 122°27′25″W
- Owned by: Service Corporation International
- No. of graves: ~8,500 niches
- Website: www.dignitymemorial.com/funeral-homes/san-francisco-ca/san-francisco-columbarium-funeral-home/8131
- Find a Grave: San Francisco Columbarium

San Francisco Designated Landmark
- Designated: 1996
- Reference no.: 209

The San Francisco Columbarium & Funeral Home is a columbarium owned and operated by Service Corporation International, located at One Loraine Court, near Stanyan and Anza Streets, just north of Golden Gate Park in San Francisco, California. Built in 1898 by architect Bernard J.S. Cahill, the copper-domed Columbarium is an example of neoclassical architecture. It is the only non-denominational burial place within San Francisco's city limits that is open to the public and has space available.

== History ==
The Columbarium was once part of the Odd Fellows Cemetery, which encompassed approximately 30 acres (12 ha). It was built to complement an existing crematorium designed by Cahill in 1895.

In 1902 the San Francisco Board of Supervisors prohibited further burials within the city. By late 1910, cremation was also prohibited. The Odd Fellows, forced to abandon their cemetery, established Green Lawn Cemetery in Colma. Transfer of bodies began in 1929 and many families also chose to remove their urns from the Columbarium. The crematorium and various mausoleums were demolished. Many of the headstones were re-used to build a seawall at Aquatic Park. The Columbarium remained, as well as interments below ground that were missed during exhumation, such as the mummified body of two-year-old Edith Howard Cook found in 2016.

After a time, the Columbarium was sold to the Bay Cities Cemetery Association and later to Cypress Abbey. As it passed from one organization to another it fell into disrepair. In 1980, the Neptune Society of Northern California bought it and began restoration. Among others, Emmitt Watson was hired by the Neptune Society as a painter but became the primary restorer of the building and functions as de facto tour guide to this day.

On March 3, 1996, the building was added to the register of San Francisco Designated Landmarks.

== Design ==
The Columbarium combines baroque and neoclassical features. Cahill was probably inspired by the Columbian Exposition of 1893 in Chicago. The diameter, from the entrance to the stained glass window opposite, is 64 feet (20 m). The width of the rotunda within the Inner circle is 29 feet (8.8 m) and the rotunda reaches a height of about 45 feet (14 m).

The eight rooms on the ground floor bear the names of the mythological winds. Six of the ground floor rooms feature beautiful stained glass windows. The window in the Aquilo room depicting three angels in flight, is attributed equally to Louis Comfort Tiffany or John LaFarge. The first floor rooms are named after constellations. The second and third floors are simpler in design. On the grounds there is a fountain sculpture of Coit Tower. Many of the interments have creative dedications and feature personal items.

The first floor contains approximately 2,400 niches, the second floor 2,500, and the third and fourth floors approximately 1,800 each, with an overall total of more than 8,500.

== Notable interments ==
The Columbarium holds the remains, memorials, and cenotaphs of some of San Francisco's most prominent founding families, and celebrities:

- George Ainslie (1838–1913) – Congressional delegate from Idaho Territory
- Ed Aulerich-Sugai (1950-1994) - artist, AIDS activist, and subject of Robert Glück's "About Ed" (2023) designed his own tomb
- John Backus (1928–2007) – Pioneering computer scientist, creator of Fortran and 1977 Turing Award recipient
- Ernst Baruth (1842–1906) and Otto Schinkel (1869–1907), the founders of Anchor Brewing Company
- Chet Helms (1942–2005) – Music promoter and father of San Francisco's 1967 "Summer of Love"
- Frank E. Hill (1850–1906) – US Army officer during the American Indian Wars and Medal of Honor recipient
- Thomas N. Howard (1957–2017) – Music and concert promoter-extraordinaire for Bill Graham Presents and The Howard Company
- Harry August Jansen (1883–1955) – Professional magician, also known as Dante the Magician
- Jerry Juhl (1938–2005) – Muppeteer and writer for the Muppets
- Anna Elizabeth Klumpke (1856–1942) – Genre painter and companion to the great French animal painter Rosa Bonheur
- Dorothea Klumpke (1861–1942) – Astronomer and mathematician
- Domingo Marcucci (1827–1905) – Venezuelan-born 49er, shipbuilder and shipowner in San Francisco
- Harvey Milk (1930–1978) – American politician; first openly gay man elected to a public office in California - his remains were relocated but a dedication still stands.
- Jose Santana (1918–1997) – Mexican-born violinist who performed with symphony orchestras and mariachi bands. He was the father of rock guitarist Carlos Santana.
- Edward Robeson Taylor (1838–1923) – 28th Mayor of San Francisco

== Gallery ==
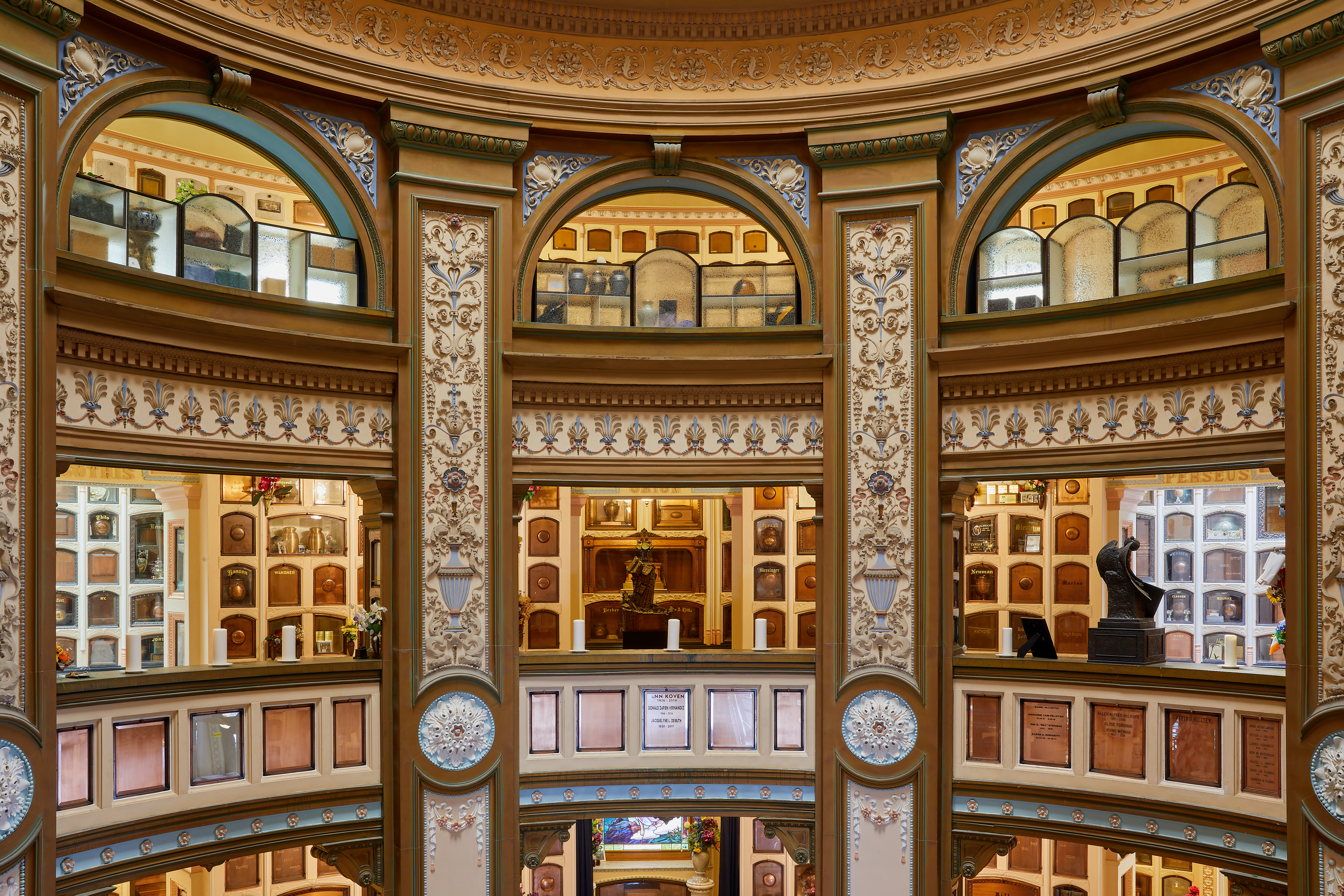
View of the Columbarium's interior

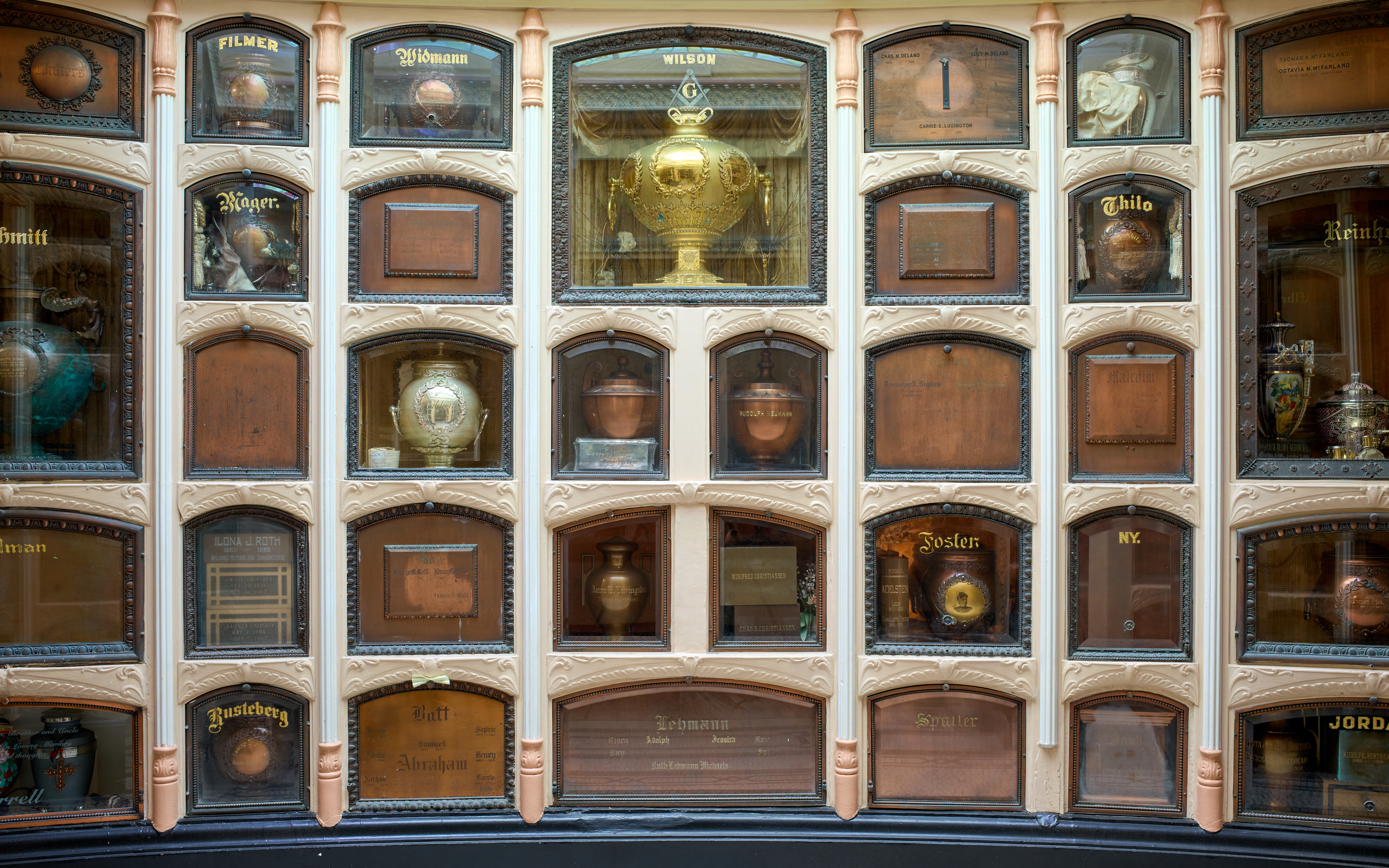
Room with urns

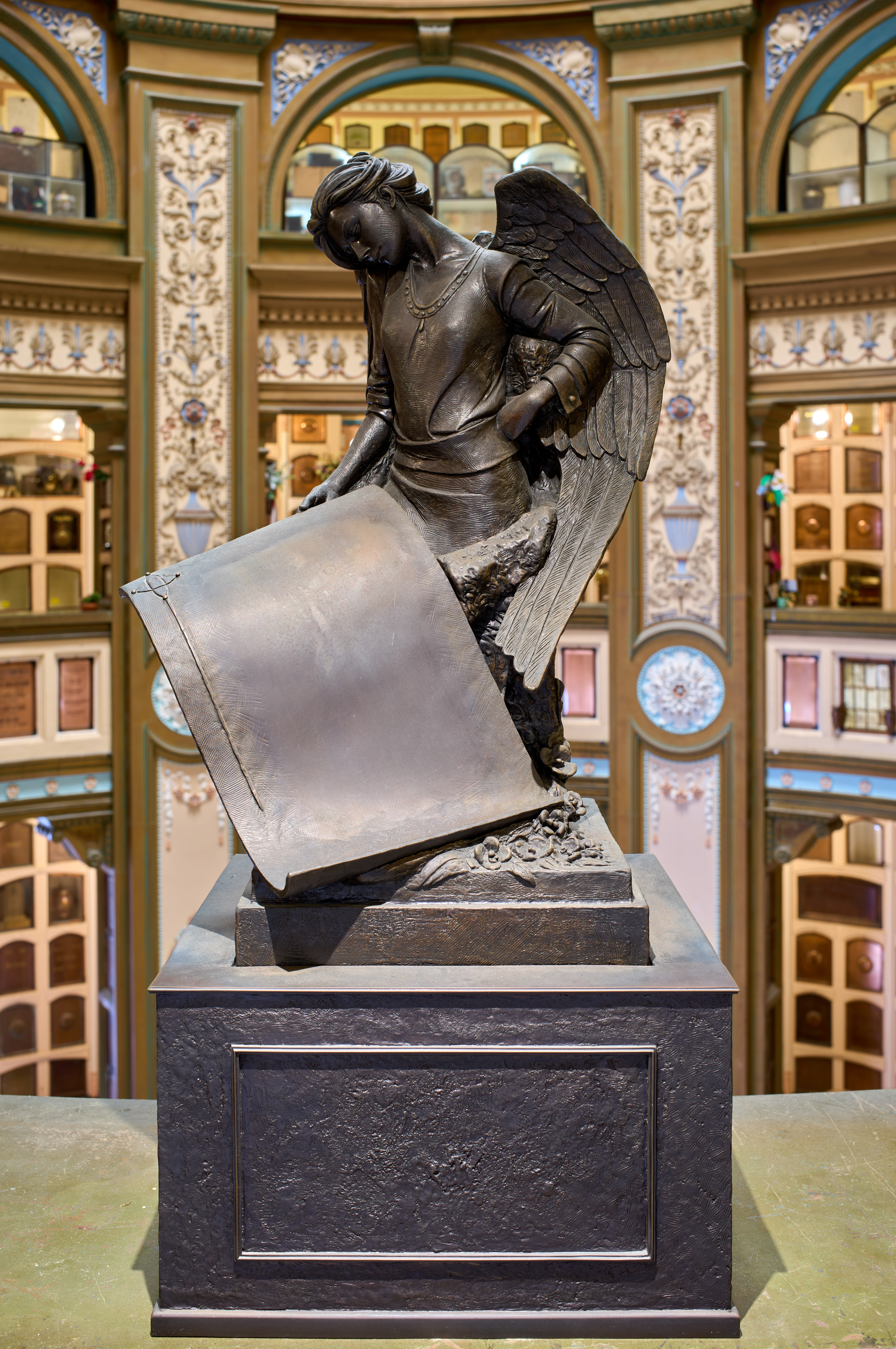
Angel statue on the second floor

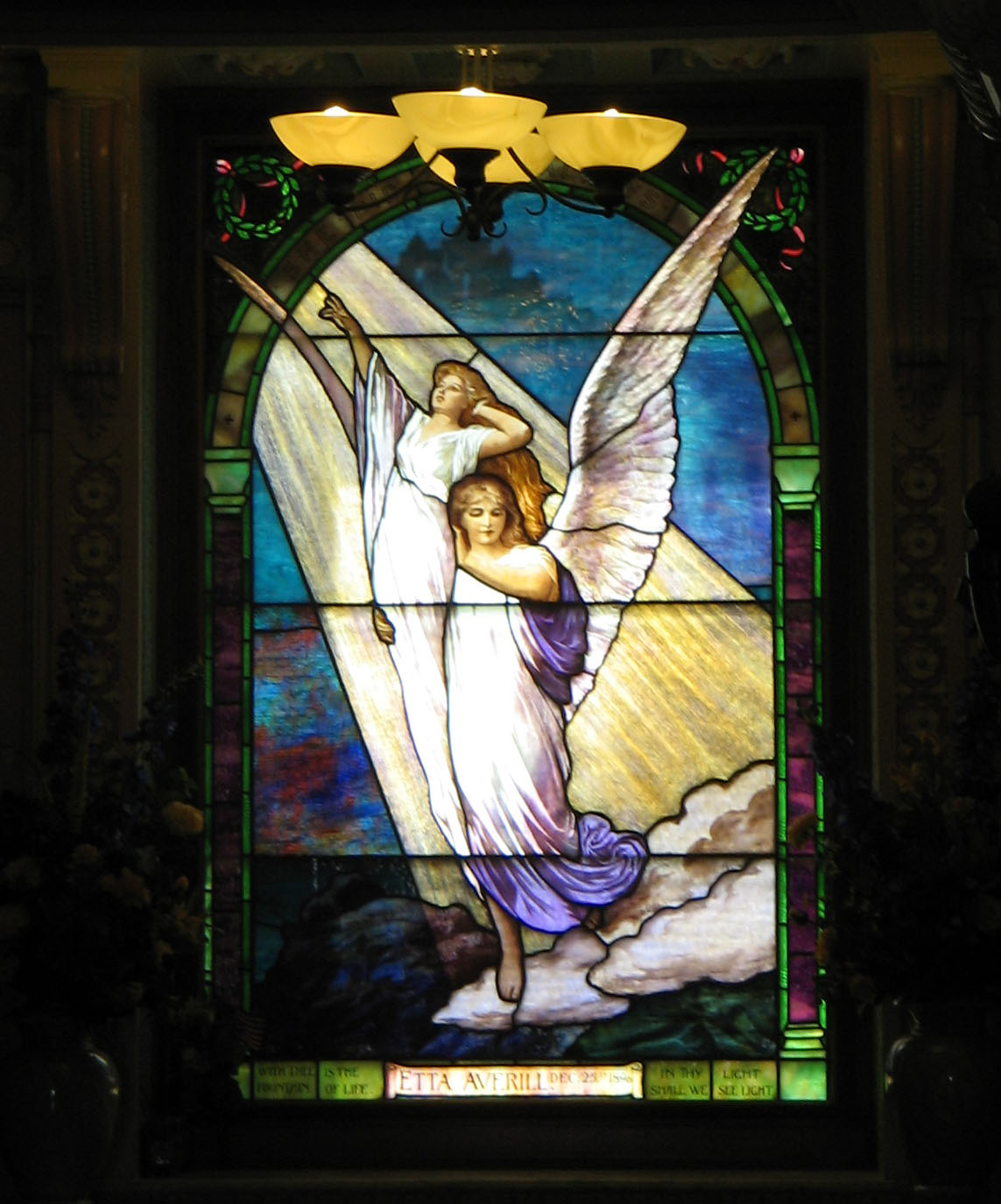
A stained glass window in the Columbarium

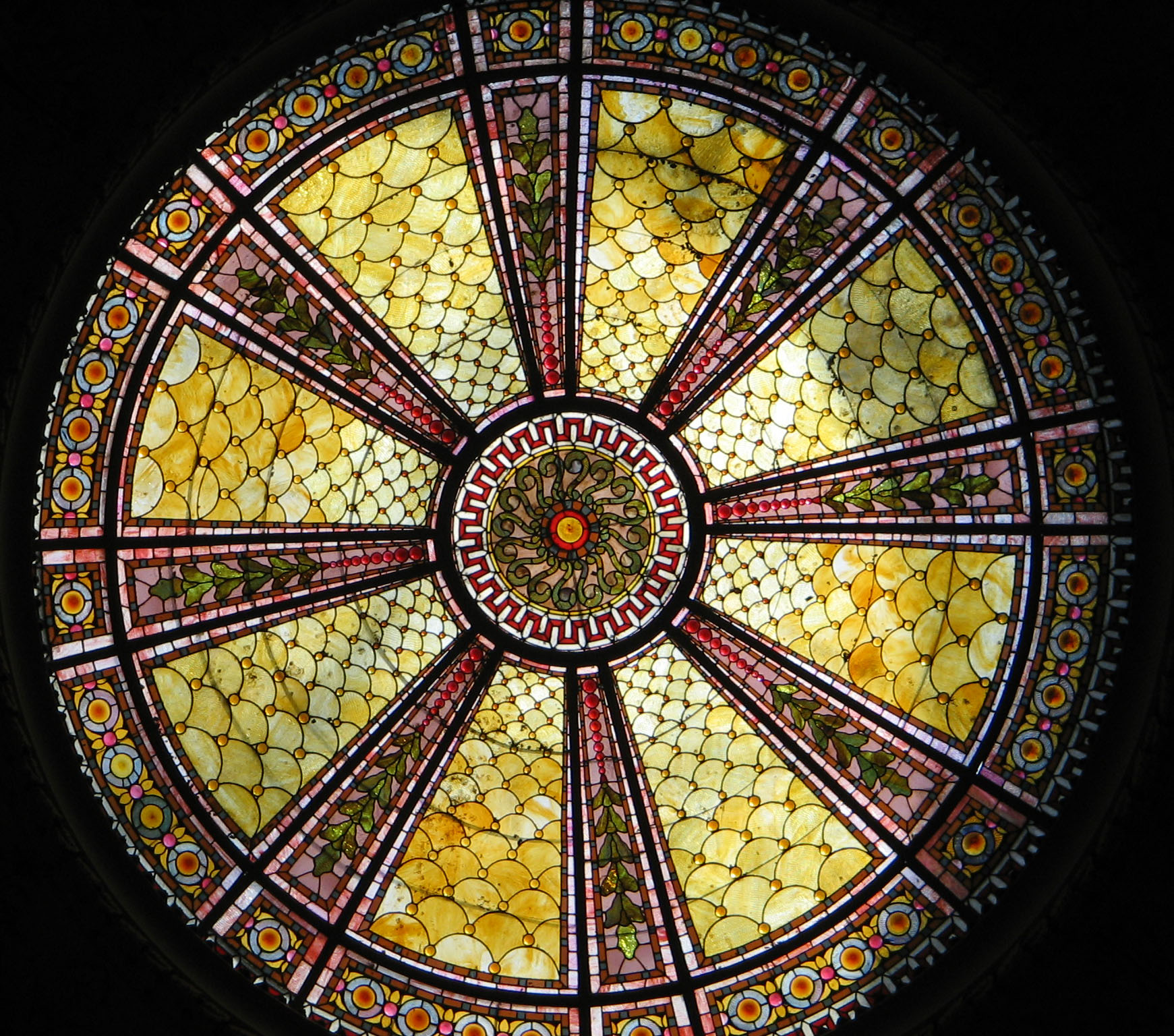
The stained glass window in the dome ceiling

== See also ==
- List of San Francisco Designated Landmarks
- List of cemeteries in California
