= Sam D'Allesandro =

American writer and poet (1956–1988)

Sam D’Allesandro (born Richard Anderson) (April 3, 1956 – February 3, 1988) was an American writer and poet. He studied at the University of California, Santa Cruz, graduating with honors in psychology in 1980 Moving to San Francisco in 1980, D'Allesandro became a central figure in the New Narrative movement, which aimed to articulate narrative as a postmodern conceptual art and challenge conventional literary forms.

His work broke new ground in queer literature by combining experimental form with unflinching honesty about gay life, sexuality, and identity. D'Allesandro's writing explored themes through a direct, colloquial, and often transgressive voice. He explicitly stated, "I want to write about the body, about desire, about the way we live and die and love". His narratives provided crucial documentation of gay life during the early AIDS epidemic, often without explicitly naming the disease, capturing the "surprise and pain of loss" during a period when its full horror was not yet comprehended.

D'Allesandro published a book of elegant lyrics, Slippery Sins, in 1984. His stories appeared in various literary magazines, and notably, "Nothing Ever Just Disappears" was reprinted in the influential anthology Men on Men. Posthumously, his collected works include The Zombie Pit (1989) and The Wild Creatures (2005), and his unique literary correspondence with Dodie Bellamy was published as Real: The Letters of Mina Harker and Sam D'Allesandro (1994). His life was tragically cut short by AIDS complications at age 31, yet his defiance of censorship and authentic portrayal of queer experience has secured his place as an essential and potent figure for study, whose influence on literature and LGBTQ+ culture continues to grow.

== Career ==
D'Allesandro was a member of the "New Narrative" movement, which included Robert Glück, Bruce Boone, Steve Abbott and others. He reached out to other like-minded writers and contacted Dennis Cooper, Kathy Acker, Benjamin Weissman, David Trinidad, and Dodie Bellamy. With Bellamy, he began an epistolary collaboration she was later to publish as Real: The Letters of Mina Harker and Sam D’Allesandro. He is also the author of The Wild Creatures, which was published posthumously in 2005, edited by Bellamy's husband Kevin Killian. He is mentioned in Fairyland, A Memoir of My Father, by Alysia Abbott.

== Death ==
A gay man, D'Allesandro died of AIDS in 1988, aged 31, leaving behind a body of work that ranges across various genre identities, from stories of one paragraph to fully developed novellas.
