= Edith Cook =

Edith Cook may refer to:

- Edith Agnes Cook (1859–1942), Australian educator
- Edith Howard Cook (1873–1876), American previously unidentified child
- Edith Maud Cook (1878–1910), British parachutist, balloonist, and aviator
