= Frank E. Hill (Medal of Honor) =

United States Army soldier (1850–1906)

- Born: c. 1850; Mayfield, Wisconsin
- Died: March 29, 1906; Manhattan, Nevada
- Burial place: Columbarium of San Francisco
- Military career
- Allegiance: United States of America
- Branch: United States Army
- Rank: Sergeant
- Unit: 5th United States Cavalry
- Conflicts: American Indian Wars
- Awards: Medal of Honor

Frank E. Hill (c. 1850 – March 29, 1906) served in the United States Army during the American Indian Wars. He received the Medal of Honor.

Hill was born in Mayfield, Wisconsin. He died on March 20, 1906, in Manhattan, Nevada. His ashes rest in the Columbarium of San Francisco in San Francisco, California.

Hill was severely wounded during an outbreak at Camp Date Creek, Arizona Territory on September 8, 1872; he later received a Medal of Honor for the incident. He also received an honorable mention for his actions north of Baby Canyon on December 29, 1872.

== Medal of Honor citation ==
His award citation reads:

Secured the person of a hostile Apache Chief, although while holding the chief he was severely wounded in the back by another Indian.

== See also ==
- List of Medal of Honor recipients for the Indian Wars
