= Gabrielle Daniels =

Poet, writer, and essayist

Gabrielle Daniels is a poet, writer, and essayist. Daniels was born in New Orleans in 1954 and attended school at San Jose State University. She was published in This Bridge Called My Back in 1981. Daniels is a recognized author of the New Narrative movement. She recently published her first book link publication called, Something Else Again: Poetry and Pros, 1975–2019. This book includes her chapbook A Movement in Eleven Days.
