= Ed Aulerich-Sugai =

American artist and activist (1950–1994)

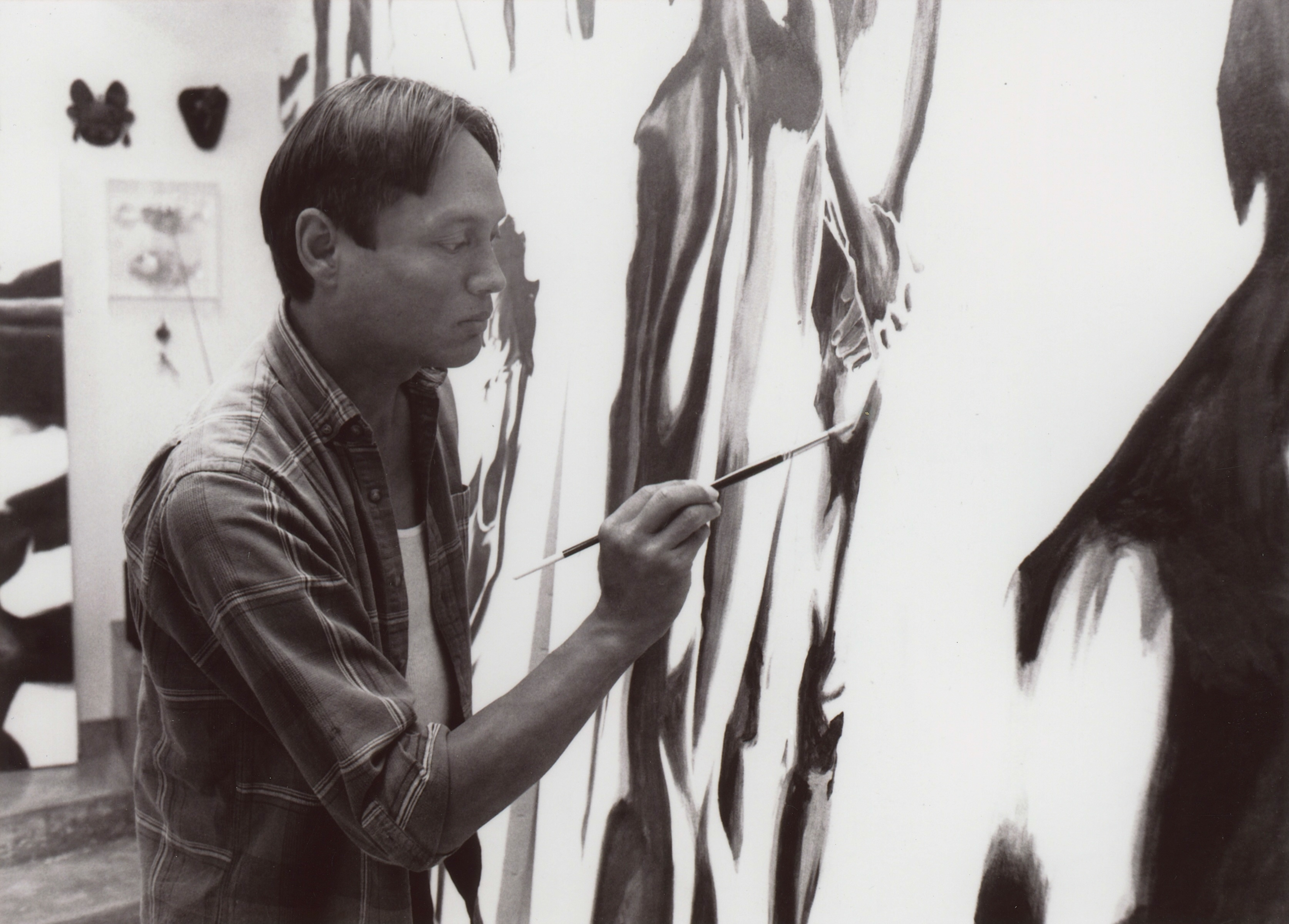
- Ed Aulerich-Sugai in his studio, 1991. Photograph by Alain McLaughlin.
- Born: May 10, 1950; Honolulu, Hawaii, US
- Died: February 13, 1994 (aged 43); San Francisco, California, U.S.
- Education: Tacoma Community College; San Francisco Art Institute
- Website: www.edaulerich-sugai.com

Ed Aulerich-Sugai (May 10, 1950 – February 13, 1994) was an Asian American artist, writer, gardener, and AIDS activist based in San Francisco, California. His artwork included sculpture, painting, murals, works on paper, and dream journals. His work explored and documented his seven-year experience of living with AIDS before his death in 1994.

== Early life and education ==
Aulerich-Sugai was born in Honolulu, Hawaii, to a mother of Japanese ancestry. When he was a child, the family moved to Tacoma, Washington. He reported experiencing social isolation in the mostly white, working-class city of the 1950s and 1960s, and was described by many as a quiet person.

In 1970, after graduating from Tacoma Community College, Aulerich-Sugai moved to San Francisco and enrolled at the San Francisco Art Institute (SFAI), thereafter receiving a full scholarship. SFAI was a center of experimental art practices and home to a queer bohemian community. Aulerich-Sugai received his BFA in painting from SFAI in 1974.

Continuing to live in San Francisco, he was active in the gay community of the 1970s, a time of sexual liberation, increasing visibility, and political activism. In 1970 he had met writer Robert Glück, who became his partner for much of the decade. Their relationship and Aulerich-Sugai's broader erotic experiences were portrayed in Glück's book “About Ed” (2023).

== Career ==
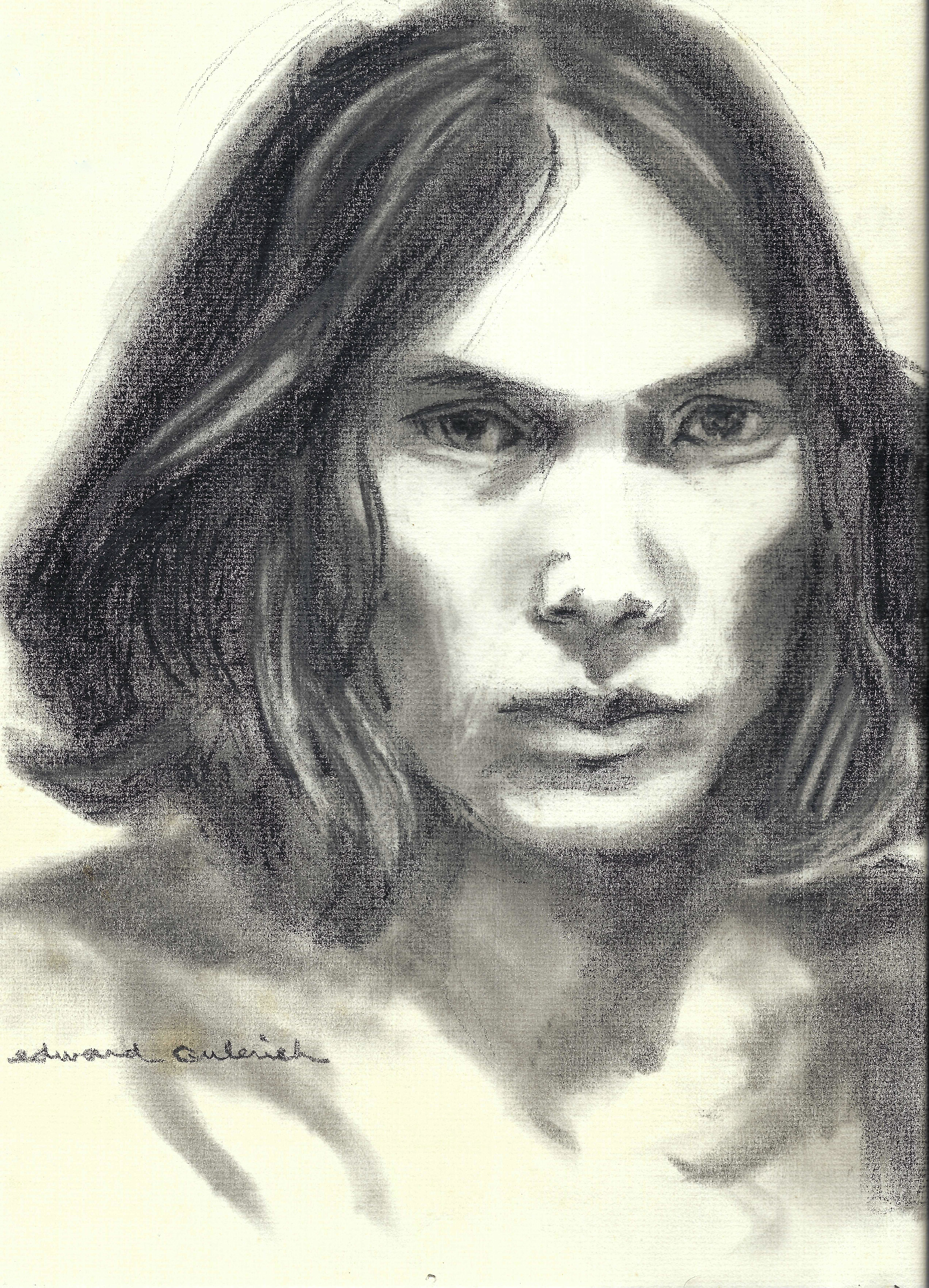
Self-portrait by Ed Aulerich-Sugai, charcoal on paper, undated.

Aulerich-Sugai's earliest work consisted of paintings of clouds, an image he would often return to. His work of the late 1970s became increasingly experimental, exploring ecology, science and evolution. A 1976-79 series of fish sculptures in cut glass, acetate, and polyester were constructed with taxidermied fish bones cleaned by Dermestid beetles. This work was described by critic Robert McDonald as “a form of ecological art created by an artist whose social awareness of life's fragility has been heightened by his recent personal experiences with illness and the imminence of death,” prefiguring Aulerich-Sugai's later experience with AIDS. He exhibited widely during this period, with several solo exhibitions and many group exhibitions of his work at galleries in San Francisco, and he published drawings in poetry journals and underground gay culture magazines, including Gay Sunshine.

Aulerich-Sugai kept highly detailed and vivid dream journals from the 1970s through the 1990s that sometimes served as a source for his artwork. Selections from these documents are featured in Glück's "About Ed" (2023).

In 1985, Aulerich-Sugai met Daniel R. Ostrow, a psychiatric social worker, at the Conservatory of Flowers, where Aulerich-Sugai worked as a gardener. The two formalized their union as domestic partners and soon lived together on Potrero Hill, where they built an art studio and cultivated a garden.

In 1987, Aulerich-Sugai was diagnosed with AIDS. The next seven years would become the most productive of his career. “The painting became a way for me to examine my illness, deal with my anger and fear and a way to focus on healing and fighting the disease,” Aulerich-Sugai wrote, crediting his artwork with healing powers, keeping him alive. He was one of the first beneficiaries of Visual Aid, a San Francisco-based support organization for artists living with AIDS (not to be confused with Visual AIDS, based in New York). He occasionally spoke about his experience, including in a 1991 interview with Spalding Gray.

During this period, Aulerich-Sugai created artwork about his experience living with AIDS. The Cells series of paintings (1986-89) imagined the cells inside his own body facing the virus. This work also increasingly explored race and his Japanese American identity, through the Meditations (1991) series of text-based paintings influenced by Buddhist practice, and the Power In Storage: Samurai Masks And Helmets (1990) series of ukiyo-e influenced mixed-media and chalk paintings where the artist used imagery of Japanese warriors and ecological hybrids as “visual mantras” to build his inner strength.

He showed his work frequently during this period, with 18 solo and group exhibitions in San Francisco between 1990 and 1992, including a solo exhibition at the San Francisco Asian Art Museum in 1991.

In addition to maintaining a studio and exhibiting, Aulerich-Sugai was a skilled gardener, working at the Conservatory of Flowers in Golden Gate Park, San Francisco. He was awarded “Best Small Garden in the Bay Area” by the Berkeley Horticultural Nursery in 1989. He used techniques of botanical illustration in some of his artwork.

Aulerich-Sugai died on February 13, 1994. He is inurned in the San Francisco Columbarium, in a tomb he designed and constructed.

== Legacy ==
In the years following his death, Aulerich-Sugai's work has continued to be exhibited regularly, and has received attention in the media, including in KQED Arts, Art in America, Frieze Magazine, The Paris Review, The New Yorker Magazine, and the New York Times.

The artist's paintings, archives, studio, and garden have been preserved by Daniel R. Ostrow as the Ed Aulerich-Sugai Collection and Archive, based in San Francisco. Ostrow was Aulerich-Sugai’s life partner during the last nine years of his life. Ostrow's care, along with that of a small circle of friends, made it possible for Aulerich-Sugai to continue creating work after his AIDS diagnosis, while his stewardship of the collection has made it available for future study and exhibition.

Aulerich-Sugai appears extensively in the writing of Robert Glück, a co-founder of the New Narrative movement and the artist's partner in the 1970s. His 2023 novel, "About Ed," which has been described as a “posthumous collaboration,” tells a nonlinear, autofiction version of Aulerich-Sugai's story that blends biography and fiction, and borrows from his dream journals.

== Selected Exhibitions ==
During his lifetime, Aulerich-Sugai had eight solo exhibitions and many group exhibitions of his work. He had solo exhibitions at Diego Rivera Gallery at San Francisco Art Institute (1974); Lucien LaBaudt Gallery, San Francisco (1976); and San Francisco Asian Art Museum (1991). Significant group shows were at New Langton Arts, San Francisco (1990); Steven Wirtz Gallery, San Francisco (1990); and The School of the Art Institute of Chicago (1992).

His work was published in "A Hundred Legends" (1989), a collection of artwork, photography, writing, and music created by 127 people with AIDS.

Since his death, his work has continued to be exhibited, including at San José Institute of Contemporary Art (1995); Southern Exposure, San Francisco (1995); Berkeley Art Museum/Pacific Film Archive, Berkeley (2018); SF Arts Commission Gallery, San Francisco (2019); SOMArts Cultural Center (2019); and Doug Adams Gallery at the Graduate Theological Union, Berkeley (2020). A solo exhibition of his work will be presented at San José Museum of Contemporary Art in 2027.

In 2026, more than 600 artworks and archival documents from the Ed Aulerich-Sugai Collection and Archive were digitized and published on JSTOR as part of the open-access collection HIV, AIDS, and the Arts.
