= Edith Howard Cook =

Mummified American child

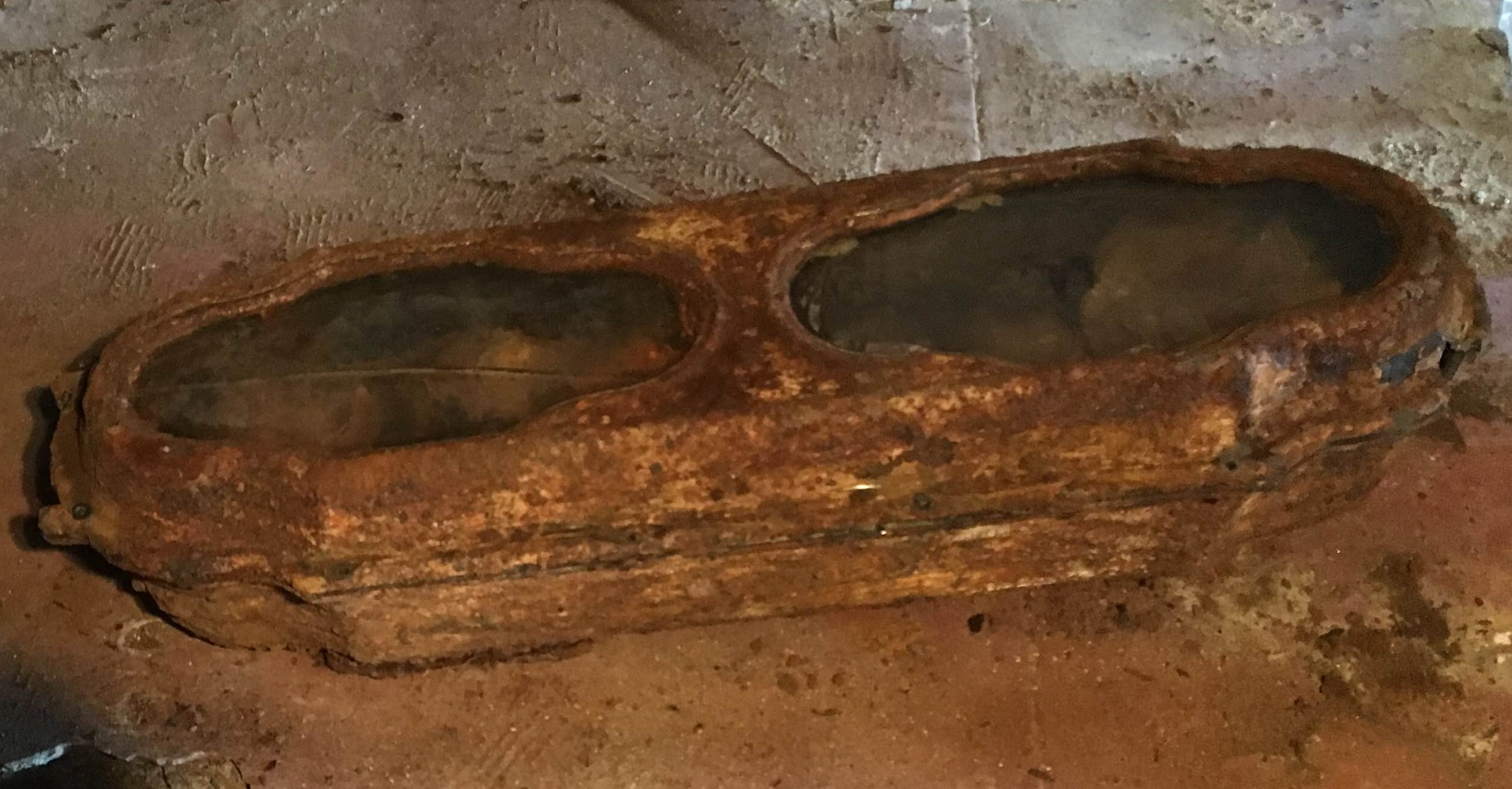
The Barstow casket Edith Howard Cook was buried in, which was found in 2016 during a home remodeling project in San Francisco

Edith Howard Cook (November 28, 1873 – October 13, 1876) was an American child who died at the age of 2 years 10 months. Her cast iron casket and mummified body were found in 2016 during a home renovation project in San Francisco, California. At the time of the discovery, her identity was unknown. However, it was known that the modern residence was atop the former location of the Independent Order of Odd Fellows cemetery, which was in use between 1860 and 1901. The Odd Fellows Cemetery was initially on the outskirts of the growing city of San Francisco, but was closed around 1903 and all bodies were exhumed in the 1930s to make way for new residential neighborhoods. Nearly all traces of the former cemetery, including headstones, were removed at that time. Only the columbarium still stands. An archaeo-forensics investigation was able to identify her name using genealogy, mapping, stable isotope, and DNA analyses. Her case provides new insights into the living conditions of children in late 19th-century San Francisco.

== History ==
Edith Howard Cook was the eldest daughter of Horatio Nelson Cook (1843–1891) and Edith Scooffy (1851–1919), who were married in 1870 in San Francisco. Horatio Nelson Cook helped establish M.M. Cook & Sons, a company that specialized in hide tanning and the manufacture of industrial leather belts. Edith Scooffy was born in San Francisco. Her father's family was Greek, and Edith Scooffy served for many years in San Francisco as a consul for Greece.

A birth announcement for Edith H. Cook appears in the San Francisco Chronicle on December 5, 1873. A baptismal record also survives showing she was baptized September 5, 1874. A sponsor for the baptism is listed as "Ada B. Barry". Edith's death was announced in the Saturday, October 14 edition of the San Francisco Chronicle, stating "In this city, October 13, Edith Howard, daughter of Horatio N. and Edith Cook, aged 2 years and 10 months. Friends are respectfully invited to attend the funeral, at 1 o'clock p.m. tomorrow (Sunday) from the residence of the parents, 635 Sutter street, near Taylor". A funeral record lists the cause of death for Edith as "marasmus".

Edith H. Cook was survived by a brother, Milton H. Cook (1871–1926), sister Ethel Cook (1878–1935), and brother Clifford G. Cook (1882–1927). A living descendant of Milton H. Cook provided a DNA sample that was matched to DNA extracted from hair removed from Edith H. Cook's mummified body.

== Archaeoforensic investigation ==
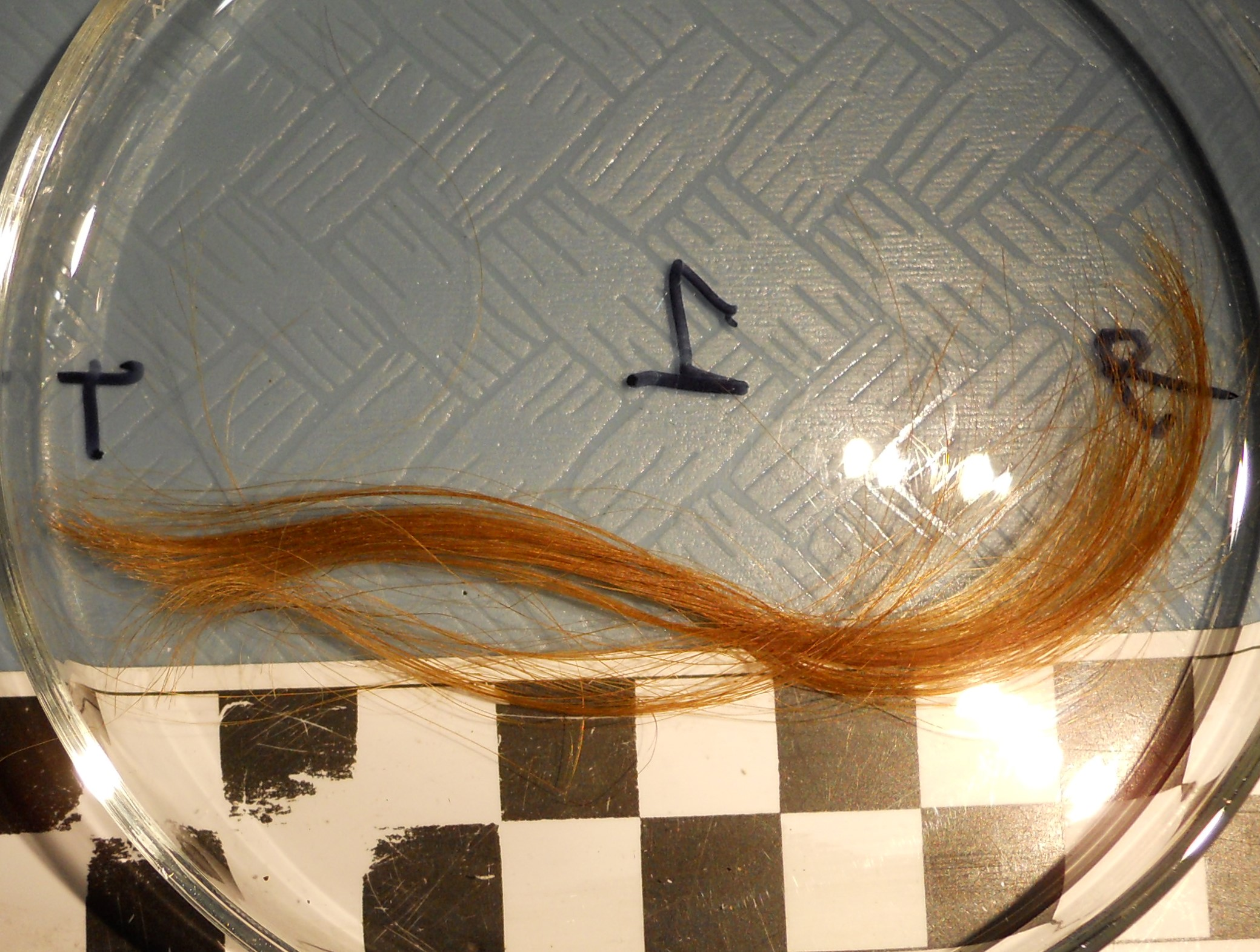
A batch of hairs removed from Edith H. Cook, used to identify her mummified body

A number of genealogical analyses, mapping the exact location of the find, analysis of stable isotope signatures within hair samples, and analysis of DNA extracted from the hair, all point to the mummy being Edith H. Cook.

A study published in 2017 on carbon and nitrogen stable isotopes of hair samples removed from the individual's head, revealed a pattern that is consistent with wasting away or nutritional starvation. This is also consistent with the funeral record listing the cause of death as marasmus.

A later study published in 2020 on hydrogen isotopes in hair samples shows cyclical variation in the isotopes, consistent with the individual dying during the late fall or early winter. This too is consistent with the known date of death of October 13 for Edith H. Cook.

Analyses of historic maps of the Odd Fellows cemetery, overlain onto the find location of the mummy, are consistent with the location of the recorded location of the Cook family plot.
