= Kevin Killian =

American poet, author, and playwright (1952–2019)

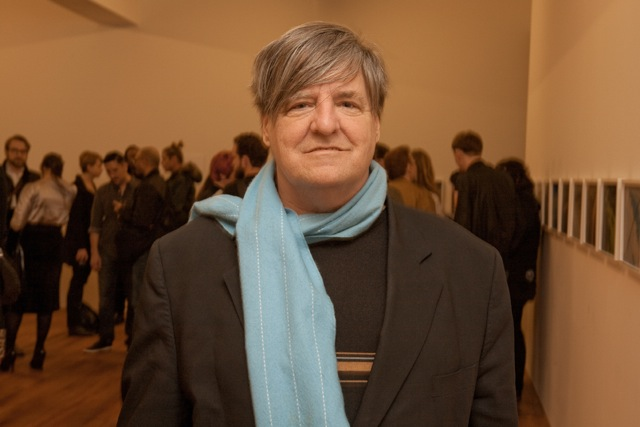
- Born: December 24, 1952; Smithtown, New York, U.S.
- Died: June 15, 2019 (aged 66); San Francisco, California, U.S.
- Education: Fordham University; Stonybrook University
- Occupations: Poet; author; editor; playwright
- Spouse: Dodie Bellamy
- Writing career
- Genre: LGBT literature

Kevin Killian (December 24, 1952 – June 15, 2019) was an American poet, author, editor, and playwright, primarily of LGBT literature. My Vocabulary Did This to Me: The Collected Poetry of Jack Spicer, which he co-edited with Peter Gizzi, won the American Book Award for Poetry in 2009.

Killian was also co-founder of the Poets Theater, an influential poetry, stage, and performance group based in San Francisco, as well as the New Narrative movement in San Francisco, which included Bob Glück, Bruce Boone, Kathy Acker, Dennis Cooper, and others.

== Life and career ==
Kevin Killian was born on December 24, 1952, in Smithtown, New York. He was raised Roman Catholic and attended a Roman Catholic parochial school run by Franciscan friars. He discussed these experiences in an essay in the anthology Wrestling with the Angel. He was also the New York City spelling bee champion. He attended Fordham University and graduate school at Stony Brook University in the 1970s.

Killian moved to San Francisco in 1980. A year later in 1981, he met fellow author Dodie Bellamy. The couple, both bisexual, were married for 34 years.

Killian admired the work of JT LeRoy (later to be revealed as the pen name and persona of author Laura Albert), and held public readings of LeRoy's work in 2000.

As a beginning novelist, Killian tied for first place in the "Hamming Up Hammett" Dashiell Hammett bad-writing contest in San Francisco in 1988. Bellamy featured him as a partially fictional character in her vampire novel The Letters of Mina Harker. His poetry has appeared in the anthology The Best American Poetry 1988, the magazine Discontents, and the anthology Good Times: Bad Trips. Killian once based a volume of poetry on the work of horror film director Dario Argento (motivated to do so as a response to the AIDS epidemic). Killian also helped author Alvin Orloff polish chapters of his novel Gutterboys. Noted author Edmund White described his work as "a kind of mandarin American casualness that is peculiar to … West Coast writers … a school of refined but deceptively offhand stylists." The Village Voice called My Vocabulary Did This to Me: The Collected Poetry of Jack Spicer, which he co-edited with Peter Gizzi, "impeccably edited". The work was also highly praised by The New York Times.

Killian's 2009 collection of short gay erotic fiction Impossible Princess won the Lambda Literary Award for Gay Erotica. The first story in the collection, "Young Hank Williams", was written with Canadian cult writer Derek McCormack. The collection was inspired by Kylie Minogue's album of the same name and, in turn, it inspired Conrad Tao's piano composition "All I Had Forgotten or Tried To".

Killian was founder and former director of Small Press Traffic. He also edited the poetry zine Mirage.

Killian died from cancer on June 15, 2019.

== Poets Theater and retrospective work ==
Killian's interest in theatre emerged in the early 1980s when he saw experimental plays by Carla Harryman. Harryman and Tom Mandel subsequently cast him in their play Fist of the Colossus. He co-founded the Poets Theater in San Francisco, and acted in as well as wrote pieces for the group. As of 2001, he had written 31 plays. He co-authored the performance art piece The Red and the Green in 2005 with cinematographer Karla Milosevich. In 2009, Killian and David Brazil co-edited a collection of Poets Theater pieces, The Kenning Anthology of Poets Theatre: 1945–1985.

Killian was also active in bringing attention to important LGBTQ artists and writers of the 1960s, 1970s, and 1980s. He held poetry readings of a wide number of influential poets and writers and participated in a number of panels, art installations, retrospectives, and memorials. For example, in 2008 he was a featured speaker at a University of Maine "Poetry of the 1970s" conference. He and artist Colter Jacobsen also helped organize a tribute ("Kiki: The Proof Is in the Pudding") to the Kiki Gallery, an influential art gallery in San Francisco in the 1980s that featured the work of LGBTQ artists.

== Published works ==
=== Story and poetry collections ===
- Little Men. Hard PressInc. 1996. ISBN 9781889097015.
- Argento series. Krupskaya. 2001. ISBN 9781928650102.
- I Cry Like a Baby. Painted Leaf Press. 2001. ISBN 9781891305665.
- Action Kylie. In Girum Imus Nocte Et Consumimur Igni. 2008. ISBN 9781934639009.
- Impossible Princess. City Lights Publishers. 2009. ISBN 9780872865280.
- Tweaky Village. Wonder. 2014. ISBN 9780989598521.
- Tony Greene Era. Wonder. 2017. ISBN 9780989598576.
- Selected Amazon Reviews. Semiotext(e) / Native Agents. 2024. ISBN 9781635902181.
- Padam Padam: The Collected Poems. Nightboat Books. 2025. ISBN 9781643622903.

=== Novels ===
- Shy. Crossing Press. 1989. ISBN 9780895943484.
- Bedrooms Have Windows. Amethyst Press. 1989. ISBN 9780927200011.
- Arctic Summer (1st Hard Candy ed.). New York: Hard Candy Books. 1997. ISBN 9781563335143.
- Spreadeagle. Portland, Oregon: Publication Studio. 2012. ISBN 9781935662099.

=== Biographies ===
- Poet Be Like God (co-written with Lewis Ellingham; Wesleyan University Press, 1998) ISBN 9780819553089

=== Edited works ===
- The Wild Creatures by Sam D'Allesandro (Suspect Thoughts Press, 2005) ISBN 9780976341116
- My Vocabulary Did This to Me: The Collected Poetry of Jack Spicer (co-edited with Peter Gizzi; Wesleyan University Press, 2008) ISBN 9780819570901
- The Kenning Anthology of Poets Theater: 1945-1985 (co-edited with David Brazil; Kenning Editions, 2010) ISBN 9780976736455
- Writers Who Love Too Much: New Narrative Writing 1977-1997 (co-edited with Dodie Bellamy; Nightboat Books, 2017) ISBN 9781937658656

=== Plays ===
- Stone Marmalade (co-written with Leslie Scalapino; Singing Horse Press, 1996) ISBN 9780935162165
- Often (co-written with Barbara Guest; Kenning Editions, 2001) ISBN 9780015263423
- Island of Lost Souls (Nomados, 2004) ISBN 9780973152142
