= Dodie Bellamy =

American author, journalist, and editor (born 1951)

- Born: Doris Jane Bellamy; 1951 (age 74–75); North Hammond, Indiana, U.S.
- Education: Indiana University
- Occupations: Author; journalist; copy editor; professor
- Spouse: Kevin Killian
- Writing career
- Movement: New Narrative
- Website: www.belladodie.com

Dodie Bellamy (born 1951) is an American novelist, nonfiction author, journalist, educator and editor. Her book Cunt-Ups (2001) won the 2002 Firecracker Alternative Book Award. Her work is frequently associated with that of the New Narrative movement in San Francisco and fellow writers Bob Glück, Dennis Cooper, Kathy Acker, Kevin Killian, and Eileen Myles.

== Early life and education ==
Bellamy was born Doris Jane Bellamy in 1951 in North Hammond, Indiana. She grew up in Indiana and went on to study at Indiana University. She graduated in 1973.

== San Francisco and New Narrative ==
Bellamy moved to San Francisco in 1978. She was a core member of The Feminist Writers’ Guild.

Bellamy is one of the originators in the New Narrative literary movement of the early and mid 1980s. The movement attempts to use the tools of experimental fiction, like transgression, porn, gossip, and memoir, as well as French critical theory and incorporates them to narrative storytelling. Bellamy was a co-editor along with, Kevin Killian, of the New Narrative anthology Writers Who Love Too Much: New Narrative, 1977–1997.

== Works ==
Bellamy published her first novel, The Letters of Mina Harker, in 1998, which follows a character from Bram Stoker's Dracula and fictionalizes her as a woman living in 1980s San Francisco. The book was re-published in 2021 by Semiotext(e). She published a memoir made up of blog entries, called The Buddhist, in 2011 which follows a similar format as Dennis Cooper's The Sluts. Bellamy's book features a self-destructive affair with a third-rate self-help guru. The TV Sutras, was a 2014 memoir that draws heavily from her own experience in the cult Eckankar.

Bellamy's memoir and essay collections include Pink Steam (2004), Academonia (2006), and When the Sick Rule the World (2015).

The writer's poetry collections include Cunt-Ups (2001), a feminist reworking of the cut-up technique practiced by William S. Burroughs and Brion Gysin, which received the Firecracker Award for Innovative Poetry, and Cunt Norton (2013).

Barf Manifesto (2008), was influence by the writer's intimate and working relationship with Eileen Myles.

A collection of new essays, Bellamy Is on Our Mind, was published in 2020 by Wattis ICA/Semiotext(e).

Bellamy has stated that she draws inspiration from Conceptual art and writing practices, including cut-ups and generated texts.

Bellamy has also directed the San Francisco literary non-profit and writing lab, Small Press Traffic. She has taught creative writing at the San Francisco Art Institute, Mills College, University of California, Santa Cruz, University of San Francisco, Naropa University, Antioch University Los Angeles, San Francisco State University, California College of the Arts, and the California Institute of the Arts.

== Published works ==
=== Story, novels, and poetry collections ===
- Real: The Letters of Mina Harker and Sam d'Allesandro
- Fat Chance
- Cunt-Ups
- The Letters of Mina Harker
- Pink Steam ISBN 978-0-9746388-0-5
- Academonia
- Barf Manifesto
- Cunt Norton ISBN 9781934254493
- The Beating of Our Hearts
- The TV Sutras ISBN 978-1-937027-39-1
- When the Sick Rule the World ISBN 978-1-58435-168-9
- The Buddhist
- Bee Reaved ISBN 9781635901573

=== Artist monographs ===
- B. Wurtz: Farm 5

=== Contributing writer or editor in essay collections ===
- a queer anthology of healing
- Writers Who Love Too Much: New Narrative Writing 1977–1997
- Dodie Bellamy Is on Our Mind
- Small Blows Against Encroaching Totalitarianism Volume 1
- As Yet Untitled: Artists and Writers in Collaboration
- Conversations at the Wartime Cafe: a Decade of War 2001–2011
- Say Bye to Reason and Hi to Everything
- Feminine Hijinx
- High Risk: An Anthology of Forbidden Writings
- The Big Book of Erotic Ghost Stories
- The New Fuck You: Adventures In Lesbian Reading
- Pills, Thrills, Chills, and Heartache: Adventures in the First Person

== Bibliography ==
- Feminine Hijinx (1991) ISBN 978-0-937815-43-4
- Real: The Letters of Mina Harker and Sam D'Allesandro (1994) ISBN 978-1-883689-17-9.
- Broken English (1996) OCLC 34635581
- Hallucinations. Meow Press. 1997.
- Cunt-ups (2001) ISBN 978-0-927920-09-4
- The Letters of Mina Harker (2004) ISBN 978-0-299-20674-1
- Academonia (2006) ISBN 978-1-928650-25-6
- Mother Montage. Belladonna Books. 2008.
- Barf Manifesto (2008)
- Pink Steam (2008) ISBN 978-0-9746388-0-5
- Cunt Norton (2013) ISBN 978-1-934254-49-3
- The TV Sutras (2014) ISBN 978-1-937027-39-1
- The Beating of Our Hearts (2014) ISBN 978-1-58435-141-2
- When the Sick Rule the World (2015) ISBN 978-1-584351-68-9
- Writers Who Love Too Much: New Narrative Writing 1977–1997 (co-edited with Kevin Killian; Nightboat Books, 2017) ISBN 9781937658656
