= New Narrative =

1970s American experimental writing movement

New Narrative is a movement and theory of experimental writing launched in San Francisco in the late 1970s by writers and novelists Robert Glück and Bruce Boone. New Narrative strove to represent subjective experience honestly without pretense that a text can be absolutely objective nor its meaning absolutely fluid. Authenticity is paramount in New Narrative, and is possible with a variety of devices, including fragmentation, meta-text, identity politics, explicit descriptions of sex and undisguised identification with the author's physicality, intentionality, interior emotional life and external life circumstances. The New Narrative movement includes many gay, bisexual, queer and lesbian authors, and the works were greatly influenced by the AIDS epidemic in the '80s. In addition to founders Bruce Boone and Robert Glück, New Narrative writers include Steve Abbott, Kathy Acker, Michael Amnasan, Roberto Bedoya, Dodie Bellamy, Bruce Benderson, Charles Bernstein, Nayland Blake, Lawrence Braithwaite, Rebecca Brown, Mary Burger, Kathe Burkhart, Marsha Campbell, Dennis Cooper, Sam D'Allesandro, Gabrielle Daniels, Leslie Dick, Cecelia Dougherty, Bob Flanagan, Judy Grahn, Brad Gooch, Carla Harryman, Richard Hawkins, Ishmael Houston-Jones, Gary Indiana, Edith A. Jenkins, Kevin Killian, Chris Kraus, R. Zamora Linmark, Eileen Myles, John Norton, F.S. Rosa, Camille Roy, Sarah Schulman, Gail Scott, David O. Steinberg, Lynne Tillman, Matias Viegener, Scott Watson, and Laurie Weeks.

== Overview ==
The term "New Narrative" was first coined in Steve Abbott's magazine Soup. The movement was founded by Robert Glück and Bruce Boone, two poets living in San Francisco in the late 1970s as a reaction and growth from the Language poets. The New Narrative writers began to emerge from a workshop held at Small Press Traffic Bookstore by Robert Glück. New Narrative writings strive to combine a representation of the author as theory-based with a representation of the author as a member of a particular identity without alienating any certain demographic of readers.

== The Role of the Author ==
In New Narrative writing, the author acknowledges being a physical being and confronts sexuality directly. This closeness between writing and writer as a body is also achieved by transgressions that appear in many of the New Narrative authors’ works. Authors create a dialogue between themselves and the readers by directly addressing and engaging the reader in their pieces. The authors also situate themselves in time and space by including pop culture references. Some authors define New Narrative writing by physical space rather than actual writing style, since the movement originated from the physical space in the writing workshops held by Robert Glück in the back of Small Press Traffic Bookstore.

== Characteristics of New Narrative ==
The characteristics of New Narrative are determined and explained by members of the movement itself. In his piece Long Note on New Narrative, Robert Glück defines New Narrative writings as possessing the following traits: awareness of physical space, metatext, poetic strategies applied to prose, creating works out of found material of autobiography, and "gossip as legitimate art." In an interview, Gail Scott describes writing as a way of "dislocating thinking." New Narrative strives to challenge the narrative or storytelling status quo in this self-reflexive way.

== New Narrative and Language Poets ==
In the introduction to the New Narrative anthology Writers Who Love Too Much: New Narrative 1977-1997, Kevin Killian and Dodie Bellamy write, "founded in the San Francisco poetry scene of the late 1970s, New Narrative responded to post-structuralist quarrels with traditional storytelling practice for reinscribing 'master narrative,' and attempted to open up the field to a wider range of subjects and subject positions. It would be a writing prompted not by fiat nor consensus, nor by the totalizing suggestions of the MFA's 'program era,' but by community; it would be unafraid of experiment, unafraid of kitsch, unafraid of sex and gossip and political debate." In "Long Note on New Narrative," Robert Glück says that Language Poetry seemed very "straight male," and he strove to find a genre that would embrace those of different identities, specifically one affiliated with the gay, lesbian, and feminist writing encompassed in New Narrative. New Narrative authors make "emotions and the experience of the body" and celebrate the idea of experimenting with prose as a community of writers rather than as individuals, two elements that Language Poetry seems to be lacking. To summarize the difference, Dodie Bellamy wrote, "I think of Bob Perelman's parody of lyric poetry, 'I look out the window and I am deep.' New Narrative, at its worst, would be, 'I have sex and I'm smarter than you.'" In an interview, Kevin Killian said that the New Narrative authors agreed with the Language Poets' ideas of transforming narrative structure, for example, challenging the hierarchical relationship between author and reader, but they thought language poetry lacked "fun." Also, he claimed that Language Poets were more well-versed in theory.

While Killian states that one of the differences between Language Poets and New Narrative writers is the Language Poets' knowledge of theory, Glück says that the New Narrative has its inspiration in the theorists Georg Lukács, Walter Benjamin, Louis Althusser, and Georges Bataille. For Killian and other New Narrative writers, the key difference here is more than simply whether or not New Narrative works use theory in general; rather, these New Narrativists are drawing our attention to their distinctly punk means of learning theory in the first place. Far from the university campus origins of most LANGUAGE Poetry, New Narrative writers often came into a theoretical and philosophical maturity via the free, open-to-the-public workshops that were something between a book club, a street protest, and a lecture hall.

== Publications ==
Presses that publish New Narrative writing include Hard Press, Serpent's Tail, Black Star Series, and Semiotext(e). New Narrative work is also included on Robert Glück's online magazine, Narrativity, and in the published companion Biting the Error: Writers Explore Narrative, edited by Robert Glück, Gail Scott, Mary Burger and Camille Roy. In 2017, Nightboat Books published Writers Who Love Too Much: New Narrative Writing 1977-1997, an anthology edited by Bellamy and Killian. Robert Glück's novel "About Ed'" a portrait of artist Ed Aulerich-Sugai, was published in 2023.
