= Bob Glück =

American poet, fiction writer, editor, and co-founder of the New Narrative Movement

Robert Glück (born 1947 in Cleveland, Ohio) is an American poet, fiction writer, artist, and co-founder of the New Narrative movement. In the 1980s in San Francisco, he co-founded the New Narrative movement with Bruce Boone and several others. His published poetry includes the book Reader (1989) and his published fiction work includes Jack the Modernist (1985), Margery Kempe (1994) and Denny Smith (2003), and essay collections such as Communal Nude (2016).

Glück was the director of San Francisco State's Poetry Center as well as the co-director of the Small Press Traffic Literary Center, and associate editor at Lapis Press.

== Early life and education ==
Glück was born and raised in Cleveland, Ohio in 1947. His father was traveling salesman and had the family eventually move to Los Angeles. He pursued his education at various institutions, including the University of California, Los Angeles, the University of Edinburgh's College of Art, and the University of California, Berkeley, where he graduated with a BA. He completed his MA at San Francisco State University.

Glück was involved with Enola Gay, a group of gay male activists who staged actions opposing the development of nuclear weapons, for most of his life. Glück studied writing in New York City workshops with poet Ted Berrigan.

== Work ==
Glück's body of work spans several decades and encompasses a range of poetic styles and themes. His writings often combine L=A=N=G=U=A=G=E theory with queer, feminist, and class-based discourse. Georges Bataille, Walter Benjamin, Roland Barthes, Julia Kristeva, and Michel Foucault were early influences.

Glück's publications include the poetry collection Reader (1989) and the collaborative work La Fontaine (1981), written with Bruce Boone. In the realm of fiction, he has published the story collection Denny Smith (2003) and the novels Jack the Modernist (1985) and Margery Kempe (1994). His writings have been featured in anthologies such as The Faber Book of Gay Short Fiction (1992), Best American Erotica 2005, and Lust for Life: On the Writings of Kathy Acker (2006).

In 2016, his collected essays were published under the title Communal Nude by Semiotext(e).

In 2023, his book About Ed was published with the New York Review of Books. Glück's book is a portrait of the artist Ed Aulerich-Sugai, an on-and-off lover he met in the 1970s in San Francisco, when gay life had erupted in contemporary life, sociality, and politics. He exhibited ceramics in an exhibition Robert Glück: Ghosts and Universes— Lingams, Rattles, and Genies at Josey in Norwich, U.K.

Glück's work has garnered recognition, including a California Arts Council Fellowship and a San Francisco Arts Commission Cultural Equity Grant.

He is married to an engineer, Francesc Xavier Permanyer Bel, and lives in Noe Valley, San Francisco, California.

== Publications ==
- La Fontaine (co-authored with Bruce Boone) (1981)
- Jack the Modernist (1985)
- Reader (1989)
- Margery Kempe (1994)
- Denny Smith (2003)
- Communal Nude (2016)
- About Ed (2023)

== See also ==
- New Narrative
- Margery Kempe
- Dodie Bellamy
- Kevin Killian
- Dennis Cooper
- Cookie Mueller
- Kathy Acker
- Chris Kraus
- Sylvere Lotringer
