= St Stephen's Church, Norwich =

Grade I listed church in Norwich, England

St Stephen's Church
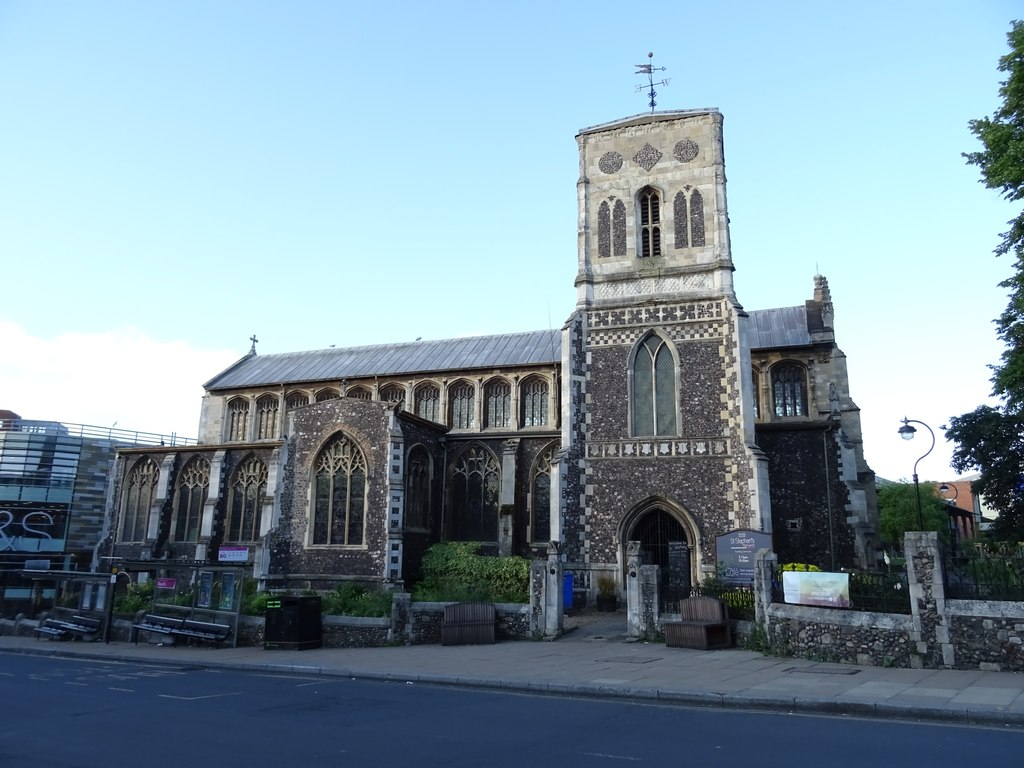
- St Stephen's in 2025
- St Stephen's Church
- 52°37′35.78″N 1°17′33.22″E
- OS grid reference: TG 22921 08294
- Location: Norwich, Norfolk
- Country: England
- Denomination: Church of England
- Website: ststephensnorwich.org

History
- Dedication: Saint Stephen

Architecture
- Heritage designation: Grade I listed

Administration
- Province: Province of Canterbury
- Diocese: Anglican Diocese of Norwich
- Archdeaconry: Norwich
- Deanery: Norwich East
- Parish: St Stephen Norwich

St Stephen's Church is a Grade I listed parish church in the Church of England in Norwich. It is located next to the Chapelfield shopping centre. It is one of few medieval churches in England to be dedicated to Saint Stephen.

== History ==
The earliest documentary reference to the church that is dateable is in a charter of St Benet's Abbey from no later than 1116, referring to it as a monasterium and noting that it was the meeting place for the county courts of Norfolk and Suffolk. This suggests that a church building was complete, with possible involvement of the King and sheriff of Norwich in its foundation. The church was established as a rectory, and its advowson was granted by Henry I to Bishop of Norwich Herbert de Losinga. Losinga's successor Eborard confirmed that Losinga had ensured that Norwich Cathedral benefitted from the parochial income of the church.

A 1205 charter from Bishop John de Gray, following the death of rector John de Hastyngs appropriated the church to the cathedral priory. The income raised from this was given to the chamberlain and used to pay for the monks' clothing, and a pension of 30s per year was additionally paid to the cellarer. In the 1254 taxation, St Stephen's had a value of eight marks (£5 6s 8d), which was at the time second in the city only to St Peter Mancroft. The church had a value of 10 marks (£6 13s 4d) in 1291. At the start of the 14th century, a 'perpetual' vicarage was established on the south side of the churchyard by Bishop John Salmon; its first vicar, Clement de Hoxne, was appointed in 1304 and the vicarage was endowed. The church was again valued at 10 marks in 1368.

The present church building dates from the 14th century. The vicarage was leased out in 1513 by the monastery's chamberlain at 4d rent per annum. The tower was remodelled in 1601. Richard Caister was Vicar from 1402 to his death in 1420, during which time he was the priest-confessor to the mystic Margery Kempe. After his death, his burial place became a pilgrimage site. The church underwent rebuilding under Dr Thomas Cappe, vicar from 1530 to 1545.

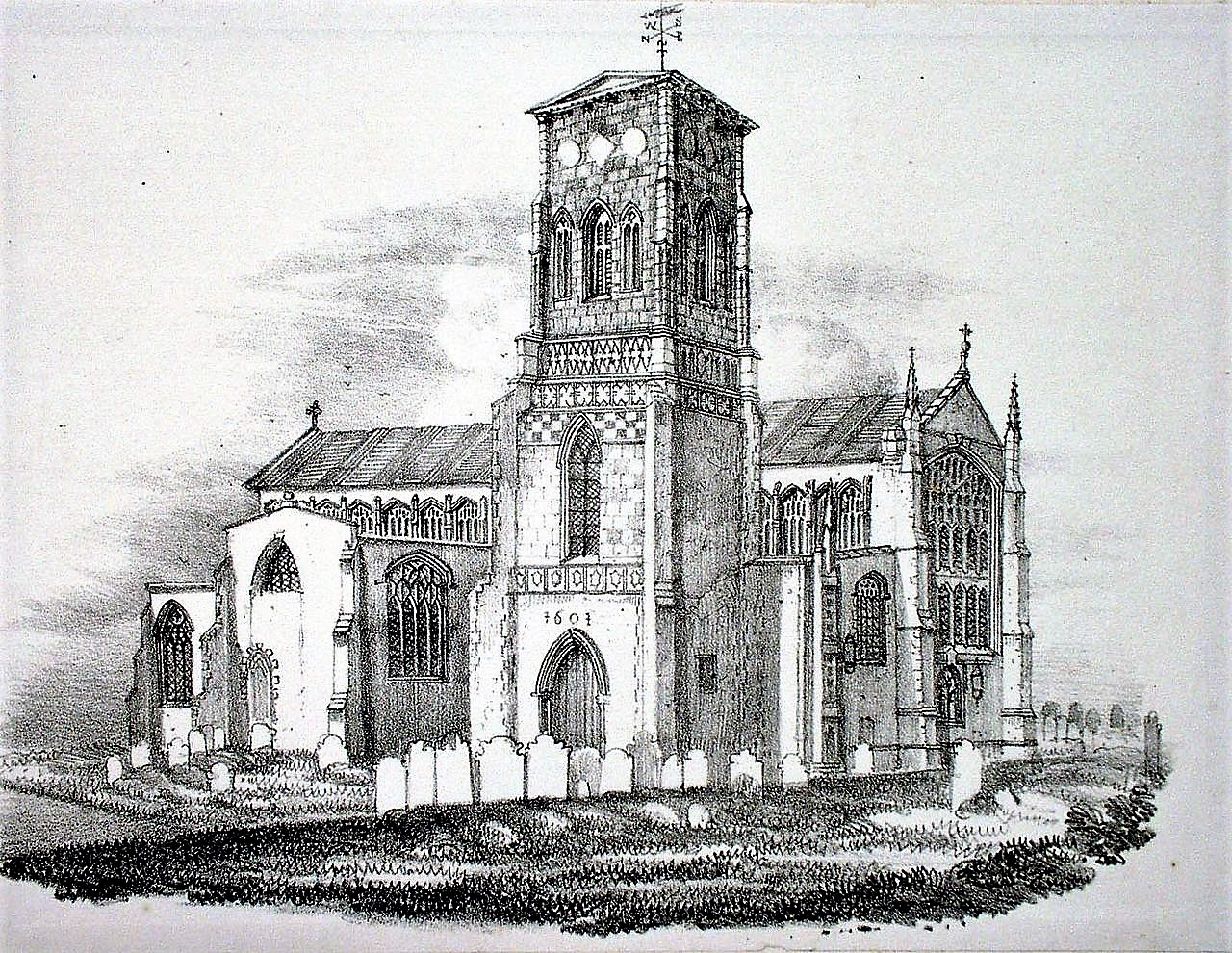
Drawing of St Stephen's by John Berney Ladbrooke (1803–1879)

In the lead-up to the Great Blow riot, signatures were taken on the church's communion table for a counter-petition in support of Mayor John Utting on 23 April 1648. In the riot's resultant explosion, the windows of St Stephen's were shattered. Repairs to the church were funded by a parish rate.

Following the construction of the Chapelfield shopping centre next to the church, its churchyard has become a busy through way.

== Architecture ==
=== Exterior ===
The church consists of a nave, chancel, north and south aisles and chapels, and a north porch which forms the base of its tower. A former west tower was demolished to make way for the church's grand west end featuring a large window. The aisles of the church date from around 1350, and unusually post-date the chancel (constructed between 1521 and 1534, pre-Reformation), and nave (constructed between 1533 and 1550, post-Reformation). The church clerestory is from 1540. and features Renaissance motifs in the columns separating its windows. The north porch is also from 1350; in 1601, this was raised to form a tower, and features decoration in the form of flushwork window shapes, roundels and diamonds. In 2007, the west doors were replaced with glass doors, allowing the inside of the church to be seen even when closed, adapting to increased foot traffic.

=== Interior ===
The interior of the church was once divided by screens though these have been removed. The pre/post-Reformation divide between the nave and chancel is apparent inside the church. Its arcade piers are in an early Renaissance style though appear Perpendicular. The roof has a hammerbeam construction, and there are piscinae for the altars of the north-east Lady chapel and south-east Saint Mary Magdalene chapel which remain. The north porch's groin vault roof has two bosses, one of the stoning of Saint Stephen, and the other of Saint Lawrence.

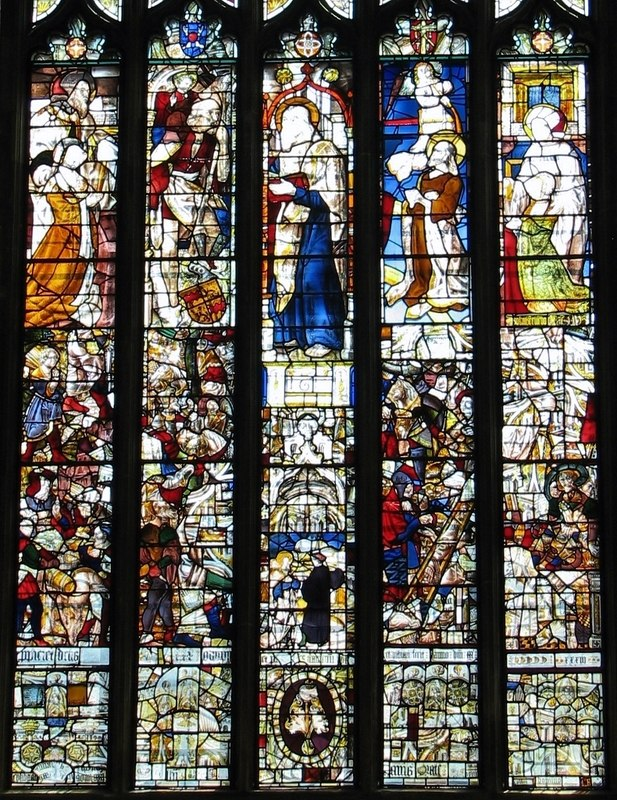
The church's reassembled east stained glass window

The east window consists of sections from multiple dates. The five large figures in this window were created in 1511 and brought to St Stephen's from the Mariawald monastery on the Ruhr in Germany. The second from the left of these pictures Saint Christopher. Other parts of the window are a jigsaw of pieces assembled from what remained after the Great Blow of 1648. More modern stained glass includes a depiction of a nativity in the north transept and a Resurrection theme in the south aisle, both by Alfred Wilkinson, as well as another window in the south aisle of Margery Kempe wearing a brocaded cloak.

== Furnishings ==
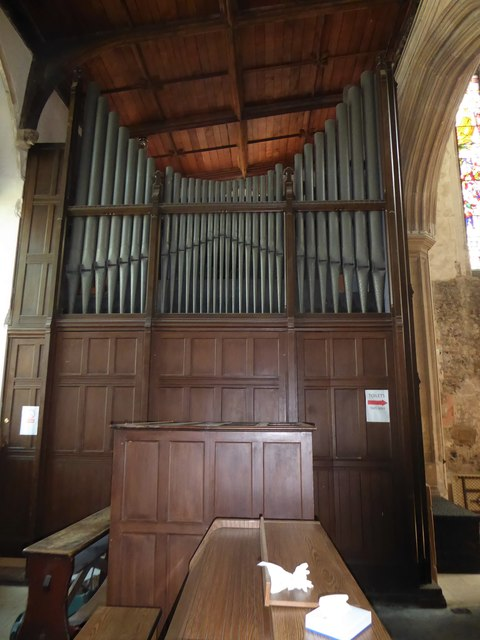
The present organ, first installed by T. C. Lewis in 1869

Furnishings include four medieval stals with misericords in the chancel, and a 16th-century font with a 17th-century cover, now standing in the transept which was formerly the chapel of Saint Anne. Stencilling on the ceiling of the letter 'T', just south of the transept, indicates the former site of the chapel of Saint Thomas. In the sanctuary there is a brass of Thomas Cappe who was vicar from 1530 to 1545 and who rebuilt the chancel, showing him wearing albe and cope. There are also brasses to members of the Brasyer family, bell founders and mayors of the city, found in the chancel and at the west end of the church. Under a small trapdoor at the east end of the north aisle, there is a brass of Elenor Buttry (d. 1546), the last prioress of Campsey in Suffolk, with two bedesmen at her feet. In the north porch is a memorial to long-serving parish clerk John Rockwood, which reads:

Underneath this stone doth John Rockwood lay
Waiting the Mercy of the Judgement Day
His life was such that he deserves these lines
To recommend his Name to future times.

There is a mural tablet to Charles and Mary Mackerell dated 1747, by John Ivory. A monument to Elizabeth Coppin is in the south aisle.

In 1808 the church gained an organ, though this was moved to Cawston in 1880 and remains there today. A monument to Elizabeth Coppin, unusually made of coade, is in the south aisle. Other furnishings are from the 1859 Phipson refitting. The church now has an organ dating from 1869 which was installed by T. C. Lewis, but which has had several restorations by Hill, Norman and Beard. A specification of the organ can be found on the National Pipe Organ Register. In 1894, a reredos was installed consisting of a painting on zinc panels by Lucy Bignold that contains the Ten Commandments, the Creed, and the Lord's Prayer; it is old-fashioned for its date of creation.
