= Nicholas Watson (disambiguation) =

Nicholas Watson (born 1977) is an American social entrepreneur, writer and filmmaker.

Nicholas Watson may also refer to:

- Nicholas Watson (academic) (fl. from 1991), English-Canadian medievalist
- Nick Watson (Nicholas Watson, born 2005), Australian rules footballer
