= Richard Caister =

English pre-Reformation priest and poet

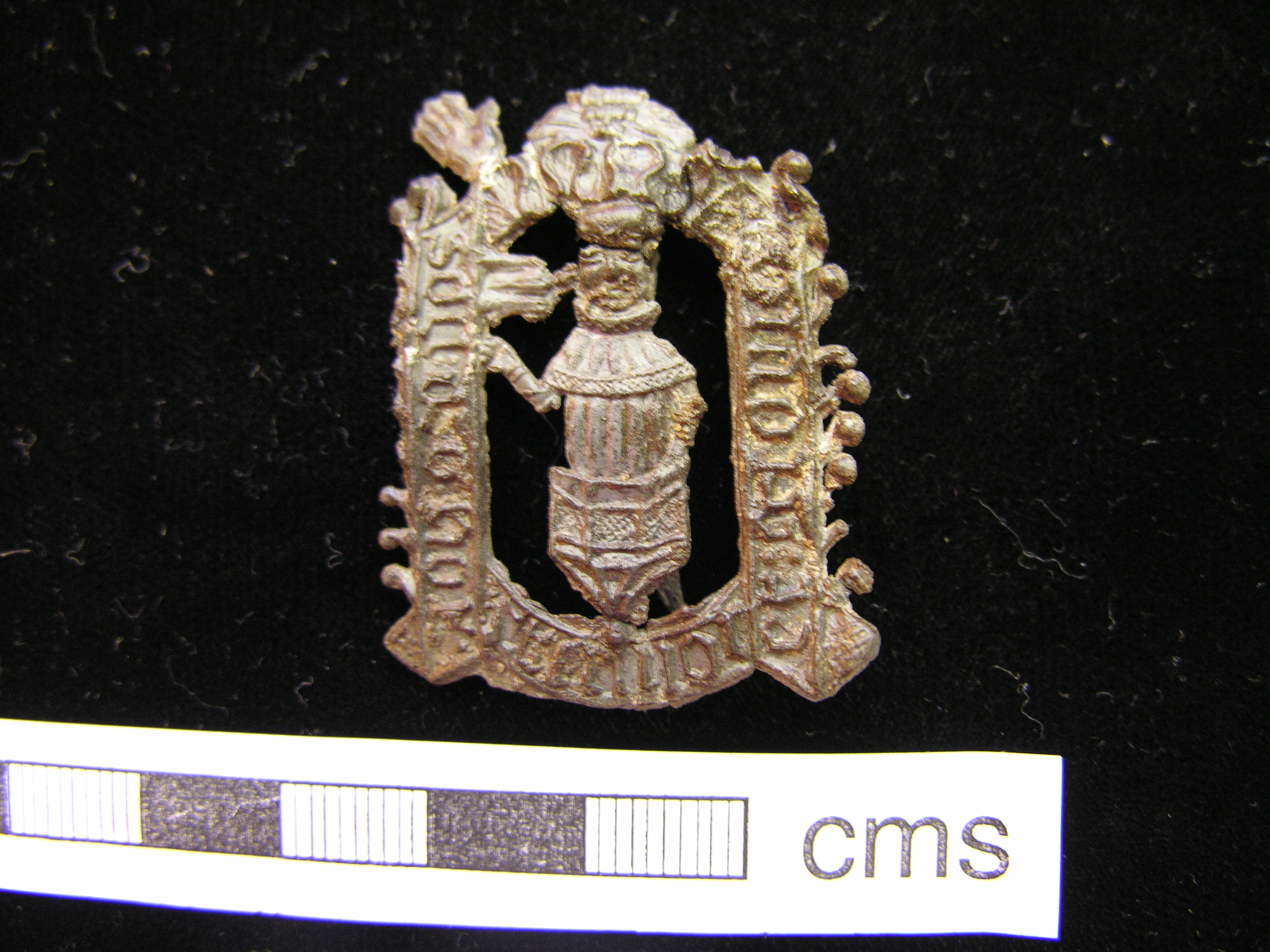
A Richard Caister pilgrim badge

Richard Caister (mid-1300s – 4 April 1420) was an English priest and poet in the late 14th and early 15th centuries, and was the confessor to the English mystic Margery Kempe. After his death in 1420 his burial place in Norwich became a pilgrimage site.

== Early life ==
Caister was born in the middle of the 14th century in either Caistor St Edmund or Caister-on-Sea.

== Clerical career ==
In 1385 Caister was admitted to Merton Priory in Surrey (now in Greater London), where he was educated for ordained ministry. It is likely that, after ordination, he spent 10 years as a monk of Norwich Cathedral Priory. From 1397 to 1402 he was Vicar of St Mary's Church, Sedgeford, and from 1402 to his death in 1420 he was Vicar of St Stephen's Church, Norwich.

While Vicar of St Stephen's, Caister was confessor to the mystic Margery Kempe, and he is mentioned a number of times in The Book of Margery Kempe. Kempe describes how she was commanded by a direction from Christ to go to St Stephen's and for Caister to become her confessor. Caister defended Kempe when she was tried by the Bishop of Norwich Henry le Despenser for Lollardy.

== Poetry ==
Caister's only extant work is a metrical hymn which begins Jesu, Lord thou madest me, for which a choral setting has been written. Jesu, Lord thou madest me was written in English; as was the Revelations of Divine Love written by Julian of Norwich, who was both Caister's contemporary and neighbour.

The late 16th- and early 17th-century Roman Catholic scholar John Pits attributed to Caister lost works on the Ten Commandments and on the meditations of Saint Bernard.

== Veneration and legacy ==
Caister was buried in the chancel of St Stephen's, and his burial place became a focus for pilgrimage throughout the 15th century. Kempe records that, even during his lifetime, Caister was a "holy man … whom God has exalted and showed and proved by miracles to be holy." After Caister's death, Kempe travelled to St Stephen's to pray for the healing of a priest. The priest was healed, and it is likely that this led to Caister's burial place becoming a shrine for pilgrimage in the latter half of the 15th century. The late 16th- and early 17th-century Roman Catholic scholar John Pits in his De Illustribus Angliae scriptoribus states that "both during [Caister’s] life and after his death [was] renowned for many miracles." St Stephen's was rebuilt in the 16th century, and Caister's burial place is now unmarked.

Numerous designs of pilgrim badges of Caister survive, with examples held in collections in the British Museum, Museum of London, and Lynn Museum,

The strongly partisan Protestant John Bale (Bishop of Ossory during the reign of Edward VI) claimed Caister as having Wycliffite views.

Having become an almost-forgotten figure, awareness of Caister was revived in 2020, for the 600th anniversary of his death, by St Stephen's, which hosted the Richard Caister Project as a celebration of his life and legacy. The Project included a number of lectures on Caister and related subjects.
