= Margery Kempe =

English mystic (c. 1373 – after 1438)

- Born: Margery Brunham c. 1373; Bishop's Lynn, England
- Died: After 1438
- Occupation: Catholic mystic
- Writing career
- Language: English
- Notable work: The Book of Margery Kempe

Margery Kempe (c. 1373 – after 1438) was an English Catholic mystic, known for writing through dictation The Book of Margery Kempe, a work considered by some to be the first autobiography in the English language. Her book chronicles her domestic tribulations, her adoption of celibacy, her extensive pilgrimages to holy sites in Europe and the Holy Land, her worship performances, as well as her mystical conversations with God and Christ. She is honoured in the Anglican Communion, but has not been canonised as a Catholic saint.

== Early life and family ==
She was born Margery Burnham or Brunham around 1373 in Bishop's Lynn (now King's Lynn), Norfolk, England. Her father, John Brunham, was a merchant in Lynn, mayor of the town and Member of Parliament. The first record of her Brunham family is a mention of her grandfather, Ralph de Brunham, in 1320 in the Red Register of Lynn. By 1340, he had joined the Parliament of Lynn. Kempe's kinsman Robert Brunham, possibly her brother, became a Member of Parliament for Lynn in 1402 and 1417.

== Life ==
No records remain of any formal education that Kempe may have received. As an adult, a priest read to her "works of religious devotion" in English, which suggests that she might have been unable to read them herself, although she seems to have learned various texts by heart. Kempe appears to have been taught the Pater Noster (the Lord's Prayer), Ave Maria, the Ten Commandments, and other "virtues, vices, and articles of faith".

At around twenty years of age, Margery married John Kempe, who became a town official in 1394. They had at least fourteen children. A letter survives from Gdańsk which identifies the name of her eldest son as John and gives a reason for his visit to Lynn in 1431.

Kempe, like other medieval mystics, believed that she was summoned to a "greater intimacy with Christ" as a result of multiple visions and experiences she had as an adult. After the birth of her first child, Kempe went through a period of crisis for nearly eight months, which may perhaps have been an episode of postpartum psychosis. During her illness, Kempe claimed to have envisioned numerous devils and demons attacking her and commanding her to "forsake her faith, her family, and her friends". She claims that they even encouraged her to commit suicide. She also had a vision of Jesus Christ in the form of a man who asked her, "Daughter, why have you forsaken me, and I never forsook you?".

Kempe affirms that she had visitations and conversations with Jesus, Mary, and other religious figures, and that she had visions of being an active participant during the birth and crucifixion of Christ. These visions and hallucinations physically affected her bodily senses, causing her to hear sounds and smell unknown, strange odours. She reported hearing a heavenly melody that made her weep and want to live a chaste life. According to Beal, "Margery found other ways to express the intensity of her devotion to God. She prayed for a chaste marriage, went to confession two or three times a day, prayed early and often each day in church, wore a hair shirt, and willingly suffered whatever negative responses her community expressed in response to her extreme forms of devotion".

An explanation for bearing this scrutiny from others was her conversation held with the mystic Julian of Norwich, whom she travelled to meet. At the end of their conversation, Julian of Norwich implores that "the more shame she [Kempe] elicits, the more merit she gains in the eyes of the Lord". Kempe was also known throughout her community for her constant weeping as she begged Christ for mercy and forgiveness.

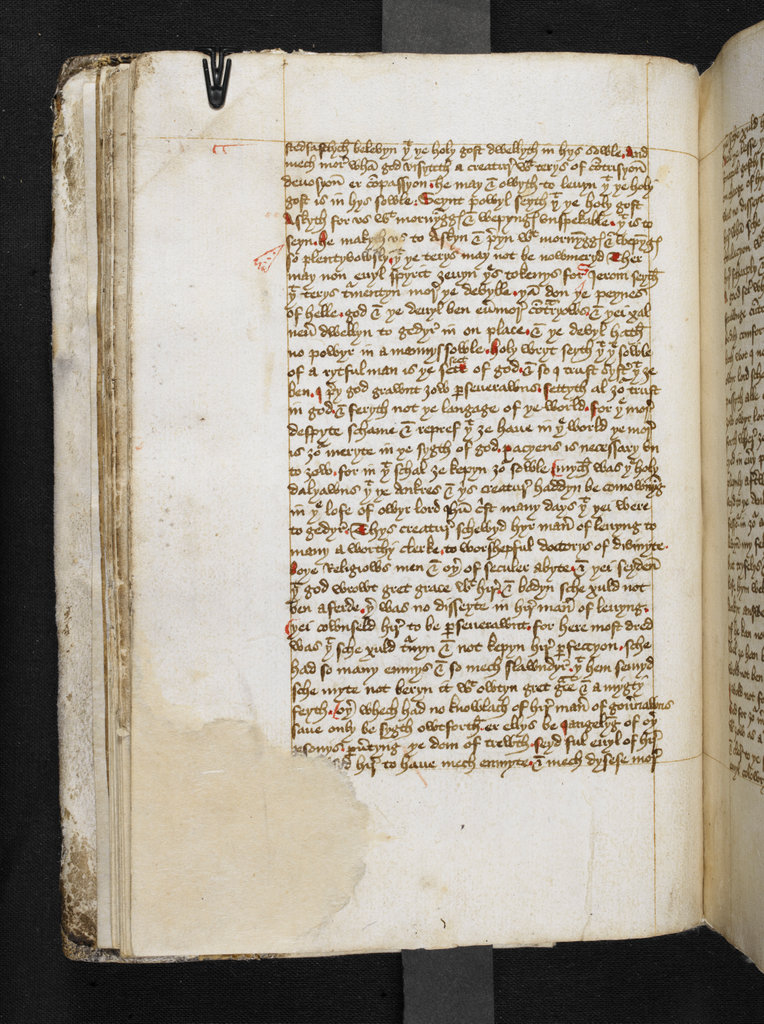
A page from The Book of Margery Kempe

In Kempe's vision, Christ reassured her that he had forgiven her sins. "He gave her several commands: to call him her love, to stop wearing the hair shirt, to give up eating meat, to take the Eucharist every Sunday, to pray the rosary only until six o'clock, to be still and speak to him in thought"; he also promised her that he would "give her victory over her enemies, give her the ability to answer all clerks, and that [He] will be with her and never forsake her, and to help her and never be parted from her". Kempe did not join a religious order, but carried out "her life of devotion, prayer, and tears in public".

Her visions provoked her public displays of loud wailing, sobbing, and writhing, which frightened and annoyed both clergy and laypeople. At one point in her life, she was imprisoned by the clergy and town officials and threatened with the possibility of rape. However, she does not record being sexually assaulted. During the 1420s, she dictated her Book, known today as The Book of Margery Kempe, which illustrates her visions, mystical and religious experiences, as well as her "temptations to lechery, her travels, and her trial for heresy". Kempe's book is commonly considered to be the first autobiography written in the English language.

Kempe was tried for heresy multiple times but never convicted. She mentions with pride her ability to deny the accusations of Lollardy with which she was faced. Possible reasons for her arrests include her preaching, which was forbidden to women, her wearing of all white as a married woman, i.e., impersonating a nun, or her apparent belief that she could pray for the souls of those in purgatory and tell whether or not someone was damned, in a manner similar to the concept of the intercession of saints. Kempe was also accused of preaching without Church approval as her public speeches skirted a thin line between making statements about her personal faith and professing to teach scripture.

During an inquiry into her heresy she was thought to be possessed by a devil for quoting the scripture, and reminded of the prohibition against women preachers in 1 Timothy. Kempe proved to be something of a nuisance in the communities where she resided, as her frantic wailing and extreme emotional responses seemed to imply a superior connection to God that some other lay people saw as diminishing their own, or inappropriately privileged above the relationship between God and the clergy.

== Spiritual autobiography ==
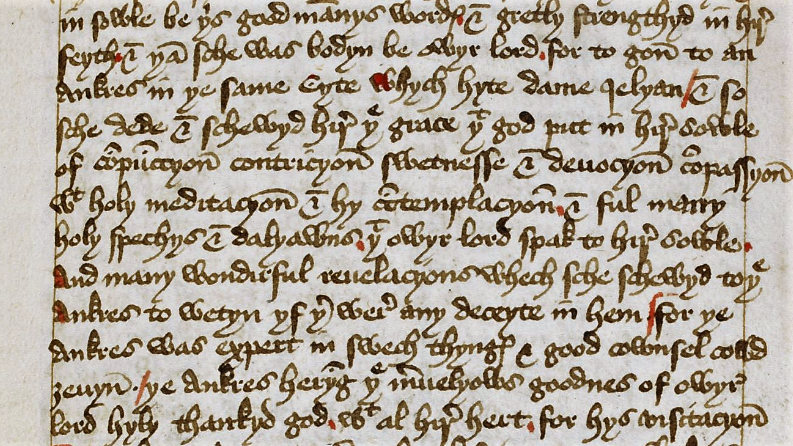
Manuscript of The Book of Margery Kempe, chapter 18 (excerpt)

Nearly everything that is known of Kempe's life comes from her spiritual autobiography known as the Book. In the early 1430s, despite her illiteracy, Kempe decided to record her spiritual life. In the preface to the book, she describes how she employed an Englishman as a scribe. He had lived in Germany, but he died before the work was completed and what he had written was unintelligible to others. This may possibly have been John Kempe, her eldest son. She then persuaded a local priest, who may have been her confessor Robert Springold, to begin rewriting on 23 July 1436. On 28 April 1438, he started work on an additional section covering the years 1431–4.

The text opens with identifying its audience: "Here begynnyth a schort tretys and a comfortabyl for synful wrecchys". It goes on to introduce Margery as "this creatur", depicting her as "wyth grett bodyly sekenesse, wherthorw [through which] sche lost reson and her wyttes". The figuration of Margery as martyr becomes clear as the text narrates "sche was so usyd to be slawndred and repreved". The narration continues to explain how she was motivated by the Holy Spirit to write her own autobiography, but struggled to find a scribe willing to write it since she had a bad public reputation. The Lord then commanded her to write her autobiography, and after her first scribe died she found another. The text explains how people spoke evil of her which made her cry, and how she forced her scribe to read aloud her autobiography before dismissing him.

The first chapter of Kempe's Book begins with the difficult birth of her first child. After describing the demonic torment and Christic apparition that followed, Kempe undertook two domestic businesses: a brewery and a grain mill, both common home-based businesses for medieval women. Both failed after a short period of time. Although she tried to be more devout, she was tempted by sexual pleasures and social jealousy for some years. Eventually turning away from her worldly work, Kempe dedicated herself completely to the spiritual calling that she felt her earlier vision required.

In the summer of 1413, striving to live a life of commitment to God, Kempe negotiated a chaste marriage with her husband. Her articulation is particularly powerful: "for the dette of matrimony was so abhominabyl to hir that sche had levar [rather], hir thowt, etyn or drynkyn the wose, the mukke in the chanel, than to consentyn to any fleschly comownyng [sexual intercourse]". Although chapter 3 and 15 of The Book of Margery Kempe describes her decision to lead a celibate life, chapter 21 mentions that she is pregnant once again, however it is unclear if the text follows a linear narrative. It has been speculated that Kempe gives birth to a child, her last, during her pilgrimage; she later relates that she brought a child with her when she returned to England. It is unclear whether the child was conceived before the Kempes began their celibacy, or in a momentary lapse after it.

Chapter 10-11 narrates her negotiating with her husband, requesting to abstain from sexual intercourse, allow her to go on pilgrimages alone, and fast regularly, which he ultimately agrees to with the caveat that she must eat dinner with him, pay debts before taking off on a pilgrimage, and sleep in the same bed as him. Chapter 12 depicts Margery arguing with Christ, as he urges her--whom he addresses as "My derworthy dowtyr"--to inform a monk of his sins, but her guilt causes her to hesitate, suggesting she is more forgiving and kind than Christ himself. When she eventually submits to Christ's request, the monk threatens to imprison her, but chapter 14 presents Christ assuring her safety from those who misunderstand her: "but I [Christ] schal lovyn the wythowtyn ende. Thow al the worlde be ayens the [although all the world is against you], drede the not [do not be afraid], for thei cun no skyl [are unable to understand] the". He continues to claim he's washed her in his blood to cleanse her of all her sins.

Sometime around 1413, Kempe visited the female mystic and anchoress Julian of Norwich at her cell in Norwich. According to her own account, Kempe visited Julian and stayed for several days. She was especially eager to obtain Julian's approval for her visions of and conversations with God. The text reports that Julian approved of Kempe's revelations and gave Kempe reassurance that her religiosity was genuine. However, Julian instructed and cautioned Kempe to "measure these experiences according to the worship they accrue to God and the profit to her fellow Christians." Julian also confirmed that Kempe's tears were physical evidence of the Holy Spirit in soul. Kempe also received affirmation of her gifts of tears by way of approving comparison to a continental holy woman.

The text also showcases Christ's commands of Margery to wear white garments which was transgressive as they were reserved for virgins in her cultural context.

Margery’s entrance into sacred spaces, particularly during her pilgrimage to Jerusalem, enables her to perform both as Christ and as a witness to Christ’s crucifixion, with the boundary separating the audience and the performer dissipating. This interplay of audience-performer occurs in Chapter 28, which marks her travels to Holy Sepulchre, along with her first outcry performance set on Mount Calvary. This initial outcry is prefaced by Margery’s concern for the perceptions of others, as she tried to hold in her tears “for noying of hem” (165), and then Kempe tells of the various perceptions of Margery from others, detailing how some feared her, hated her, wished to see her death, but of course the “ghostly men looved her and favored her the more” (165). Here, Margery’s audiences become essentially characters in the narrator’s (as in Kempe’s) performance of her life (as Margery) in her autobiography, and it is telling that it is only the spiritual men who have good impressions of her, as their perceptions are often raised above that of others, while ungodly men tend to threaten and challenge Margery. Scholars have commented on how Margery’s tears function to transform her role from being ‘a passive witness’ to an ‘active actor’, as Morrison elucidates, “Her acting reveals itself in the form of tears, roaring, and crying. Through this acting, she becomes a spectacle herself. The audience of visions, Kempe, becomes the performer. The spectator becomes the spectacle”. In this way, Kempe muddles the boundary between the audience and performer upon her entrance into a sacred space, which allows her to oscillate between gendered roles.

Moving on to Margery’s actual visions on Mount Calvary, Kempe narrates in such a way as to render Margery’s abject, uncontrollable, and wounded body a shared space with Christ’s crucified body. For context, during the medieval period, the figuration of God and/or Christ as a mother was not necessarily uncommon, which is exemplified in Julian of Norwich’s Showings. Kempe elicits this tradition in Chapter 28, describing Margery’s outburst before her visions begin: “And whan the body myth ne lenger enduryn the ghostly labour, but was ovyrcome wyth the unspekabyl lofe that wrowt so fervently in the sowle, than sche fel down and cryed wondyr lowde” (166). The physical manifestation of her emotional labour in a physical fall epitomises Margery’s use of sacred spaces as a stage for her performances of faith. This moment also marks Margery’s entrance into a liminal space, where the body of Christ and the mother become one through both being pushed beyond endurance. As Normington remarks, “She enters a ‘no man’s land’, a place where gender identity is less fixed. Through this liminal experience she is able to inscribe her body with the pain of Christ’s (and that of the Virgin and the Magdalene)”. The emphasis on the uncontrollable and uncontainable tears may encourage readers to recollect Chapter 1, when her body was physically bound after labour. This connection is further developed when Margery’s visions depict the body of Christ as “alto-rent and toryn wyth scorgys, mor ful of wowndys than evyr was duffehows of holys” (166). The physical opening of the body breaks down the self/other boundary separating Margery from Christ, which can be regarded as Margery’s rebirth in the body of Christ. As scholars have noted, Kempe “draws upon both ideological and experiential discourses of motherhood in a variety of ways, exploiting the potential they hold for female empowerment and facilitating her own occupation of her preferred subject positions of holy woman and spiritual mother to the whole world”. Moreover, Chapter 29 concludes with another interesting confusion of the audience as readers and characters readers are familiar with, namely Christ (i.e., the protagonist of the Gospels), who tells Margery (i.e., the protagonist of this book), “Dowtyr, I schal makyn al the werld to wondryn of the, and many man and many woman schal spekyn of me for lofe of the, and worshepyn me in the” (172). The play between ‘me’ and ‘the’, along with the reversal of the common notion Christians inhabit ‘the body of Christ’, with Christ being ‘in’ Margery, both work to obfuscate the Margery/Christ boundary. The reference to worship is also thought-provoking, since the opening sentence of Book 1 can be re-read as meaning the worship and magnification of Christ’s name is tied to the name of that ‘synful wrecch’. The abject, wounded, and torn open body is made a shared space containing both Christ in Margery’s vision and Margery in the opening chapter.

In fact, Margery and Kempe create her own body of text–as in Margery’s ‘script’ and Kempe’s auto-biography–which enables Margery Kempe to overcome other’s readings of her abject body. Although Margery’s script is not necessarily in the written word, this does not negate its existence, and some scholars have even understood this script as in “the language of tears”, which necessarily cannot be translated into written English. This script allows Margery to perform her emotions and pain in centres of power, forcing audiences to see the suffering women experience in the feminine body. Furthermore, Kempe’s autobiography translates the reading of her own body into a body of text, hence “her body is her first and most important “book” (we think of her tearing of hair and rending of skin early on after the priest refuses to hear her confession during her postpartum depression)”. The book is born through Margery’s labour to find a scribe (which is detailed in the prologue), along with her labour of a child (conceiving her conversion narrative detailed in chapter 1). Thus, the first chapter must not be written off as postpartum psychosis or depression, especially when considering the double that appears in Chapter 75. Instead, the acute awareness of the text-as-body demonstrates how the organisation of the text is silent but meaningful; the text is staged thoughtfully so as to re-stage the place of the feminine (and her body). For instance, in Chapters 46-7, Kempe re-reads the sexualised feminine body by depicting masculine roles as the sexual aggressors who read Margery as a strumpet just to sexually assault her. McAvoy’s analysis of the situation proves insightful: "For the steward, Margery’s display of courage, defiance and lack of appropriate deference to him as an authoritative male paradoxically signifies a woman out of control. His solution is to attempt to force upon her his own masculine control by means of the act of rape, and in so doing inscribe upon her the subjectivity of whore. As she is labelled by him, so she will also be treated by him in this ultimate act of interpellative naming and defining and the man is only restrained by her timely invocation of her own divine gifts which she is at pains to tell him come ‘of þe Holy Gost & not of hir owyn cunnyng’.”

In chapter 62, Kempe describes an encounter with a friar who was relentless in his accusation for her incessant tears. The friar admitted to having read of Marie of Oignies and recognised that Kempe's tears were also a result of similar authentic devotion. During this time, Kempe's spiritual confessor was Richard Caister, the Vicar of St Stephen's Church, Norwich, who was buried in the church in 1420. Kempe prayed at Caister's burial place for the healing of a priest. After the priest was healed, Caister's burial place became a shrine for pilgrimage.

In 1438, the year her book is known to have been completed, a "Margueria Kempe", who may well have been Margery Kempe, was admitted to the Trinity Guild of Lynn. It is not known whether this is the same woman, and it is unknown when or where after this date Kempe died.

== Later influence ==
The manuscript was copied, probably shortly before 1450, by someone who signed himself Salthows on the bottom portion of the final page. This scribe has been shown to be the Norwich monk Richard Salthouse. The manuscript contains annotations by four different writers. The first page of the manuscript contains the rubric "Liber Montis Gracie. This boke is of Mountegrace," making certain that some of the annotations are the work of monks associated with the important Carthusian priory of Mount Grace in Yorkshire. Although the four readers largely concerned themselves with correcting mistakes or emending the manuscript for clarity, there are also remarks about the Book's substance and some images which reflect Kempe's themes and images. A recipe, added to the final folio of the manuscript by a late 14th- or early 15th-century reader of the Book, possibly at the cathedral priory in Norwich, provides more evidence of its readership and has been determined to be for medicinal sweets, or digestives, called 'dragges'.

Kempe's book was essentially lost for centuries, being known only from excerpts published by Wynkyn de Worde in around 1501, and by Henry Pepwell in 1521. In 1934, a manuscript, now British Library Add MS 61823, the only surviving manuscript of Kempe's Book, was found in the private library of the Butler-Bowdon family, and then consulted by Hope Emily Allen. It has since been reprinted and translated in numerous editions.

== Significance ==
Part of Kempe's significance lies in the autobiographical nature of her book. It is the best insight available of a female middle-class experience in the Middle Ages. Kempe is unusual compared to contemporaneous holy women, such as Julian of Norwich, because she was not a nun or anchoress. Nor was she heavily privileged, such as Bridget of Sweden or the Paston women. Kempe has sometimes been depicted as an "oddity" or a "madwoman", and often contempary readers respond with extreme love or hate.

Her Book is revealed as a carefully constructed spiritual and social commentary. Some have suggested that it was written as fiction to explore the aspects of the society in which she lived in a believable way. The suggestion that Kempe wrote her book as a work of fiction is said to be supported by the fact that she speaks of herself as "this creature" throughout the text, dissociating her from her work. However, given fiction/non-fiction genre binaries fail to apply to medieval texts, this is a misguided way to approach her. Instead, she carefully constructs her narrative to figure herself as a saint and even as a Jesus type, hence her text is more of a performance than a objective record of her life.

Her autobiography begins with "the onset of her spiritual quest, her recovery from the ghostly aftermath of her first child-bearing". There is no firm evidence that Kempe could or could not read or write, but Leyser notes that her religious culture was certainly informed by texts. She had such works read to her, including the Incendium Amoris by Richard Rolle. Walter Hilton has been cited as another possible influence upon Kempe. Among other books that Kempe had read to her were, repeatedly, The Revelations of Saint Birgitta of Sweden. Her own pilgrimages were related to those of that married saint, who had had eight children.

Kempe and her Book are significant because they express the tension in late medieval England between institutional orthodoxy, and increasingly public modes of religious dissent, especially those of the Lollards. Throughout her spiritual career, Kempe was challenged by both church and civil authorities on her adherence to the teachings of the institutional Church. The Bishop of Lincoln and the Archbishop of Canterbury, Thomas Arundel, were involved in trials of her allegedly teaching and preaching on scripture and faith in public, and wearing white clothes, interpreted as hypocrisy on the part of a married woman. In his efforts to suppress heresy, Arundel had enacted laws that forbade allowing women to preach, since the very fact of a woman preaching was seen as anti-canonical.

In the 15th century, a pamphlet was published that represented Kempe as an anchoress and stripped from her "Book" any potential heterodoxical thought or dissenting behaviour. That made some later scholars believe that she was a vowed religious holy woman like Julian of Norwich, and they were surprised to encounter the psychologically and spiritually complex woman revealed in the original text of the "Book".

Her significance to feminism is rather profound, as she subverts reductive assumptions of medieval women as passively accepting opression and misogyny. One of her lines of symbolism relates to the feminine body as the first chapter opens with Margery’s postpartum body–the book is born with a literal birth. However, Margery’s body undergoes significant transformations with her movement through space, specifically her entrance into sacred spaces during her pilgrimages. Interestingly, Margery uses these sacred spaces as places to witness visions of Christ and perform her faith through her body with outbursts of tears, essentially becoming both audience and actor. In this process, Margery Kempe re-envisions the non-virginal, abject, feminine body as that of a holy woman and simultaneously re-envisions the marginalisation of women in centres of religious authority and places of theatrical performances. Through this, Kempe makes space for women’s voices, especially that of non-virginal women, in Medieval literary history and liberates the feminine body from the margins of (author)ative spaces.

Therefore, Kempe’s emphasis on Margery’s illiteracy is ironic, as she not only reads the sign of her feminine body, but also inscribes it with meaning through clothing and likeness to Christ. Even more ironic is the denial of Margery Kempe’s voice in the text, in that Kempe and her scribes function as stage directors for Margery’s script of tears and life performance. One contributing reason behind the misconception that a scribe authored The Book of Margery Kempe is the conceptual separation of the written and spoken word; instead, all words can be better understood as existing within dialogue, with the voice of any author or speaker necessarily containing the language of others. Thus, Judith Butler’s problematisation of the self/other dualism applies not only to the human body, but also ‘the body’ of the text: “For inner and outer worlds to remain utterly distinct, the entire surface of the body would have to achieve an impossible impermeability”. Instead of this ‘impossible impermeability’, Margery’s body births her children and is reborn ‘in the body of Christ’, while the text was born from Kempe’s dialogue with her scribes, but also a deeper dialogue with literary history. Returning to the topic of space, Margery Kempe resists spatial boundaries by seldom marking her place, using space as a stage, and constantly crossing and disrupting geographical and gendered territories. Additionally, Kempe re-imagines the area of the non-virginal, postpartum, feminine body by performing as a Holy Woman and entering into liminal spaces that enable her to become one with the body of Christ.

== Mysticism ==
In the 14th century, the task of interpreting the Bible and God through the written word was nominally restricted to men, specifically ordained priests. Because of this restriction, women mystics often expressed their experience of God differently – through the senses and the body – especially in the late Middle Ages. Mystics directly experienced God in three classical ways: first, bodily visions, meaning to be aware with one's senses – sight, sound, or others; second, ghostly visions, such as spiritual visions and sayings directly imparted to the soul; and lastly, intellectual enlightenment, where one's mind came into a new understanding of God.

Margery Kempe's style of mysticism was very participatory, judging by the fact that, along with her visions, she had specific actions that she would complete as a way of devoting herself to God. Namely, Kempe wept frequently as a way of showing her religiosity. There was another, perhaps more important, purpose associated with her weeping; that is, she could "win many souls from him [the Devil] with your weeping".

== Pilgrimages ==
Kempe was motivated to make a pilgrimage by hearing or reading the English translation of The Revelations of Saint Birgitta of Sweden. This work promotes the purchase of indulgences at holy sites. These were pieces of paper representing the pardoning by the Church of purgatorial time, otherwise owed after death due to sins. Kempe went on many pilgrimages and is known to have purchased indulgences for friends, enemies, the souls trapped in Purgatory and herself.

=== First Great Pilgrimage, 1413–1415 ===
In 1413, soon after her father's death, Kempe left her husband to make a pilgrimage to the Holy Land. During the winter, she spent 13 weeks in Venice but she talks little about her observations of Venice in her book. At the time Venice was at "the height of its medieval splendor, rich in commerce and holy relics." From Venice, Kempe travelled to Jerusalem via Ramlah.

Kempe's voyage from Venice to Jerusalem is not a large part of her story overall. It is thought that she passed through Jaffa, which was the usual port for pilgrims who were heading to Jerusalem. One vivid detail that she recalls was her riding on a donkey when she saw Jerusalem for the first time, probably from Nabi Samwil, and that she nearly fell off the donkey because she was in such shock from the vision in front of her.

During her pilgrimage Kempe visited places that she saw to be holy. She was in Jerusalem for three weeks and went to Bethlehem where Christ was born. She visited Mount Zion, which was where she believed Jesus had washed his disciples' feet. Kempe visited the burial places of Jesus, his mother Mary and the cross itself. She went to the River Jordan and Mount Quarentyne, which was where they believed Jesus had fasted for forty days, and Bethany, where Martha, Mary and Lazarus had lived.

After she visited the Holy Land, Kempe returned to Italy and stayed in Assisi before going to Rome. Like many other medieval English pilgrims, Kempe resided at the Hospital of Saint Thomas of Canterbury in Rome. During her stay, she visited many churches including San Giovanni in Laterano, Santa Maria Maggiore, Santi Apostoli, San Marcello and St Birgitta's Chapel. She left Rome in Easter 1415. When Kempe returned to Norwich, she passed through Middelburg, in today's Netherlands.

=== Pilgrimage to Santiago de Compostela, 1417–1418 ===
In 1417, Kempe set off on a pilgrimage to Santiago de Compostela in Spain, travelling via Bristol, where she stayed at Henbury with Thomas Peverel, bishop of Worcester. On her return from Spain she visited the shrine of the holy blood at Hailes Abbey, in Gloucestershire, and then went to Leicester.

Kempe recounts several public interrogations during her travels. One followed her arrest by the Mayor of Leicester who accused her, in Latin, of being a "cheap whore, a lying Lollard," and threatened her with prison. After Kempe was able to insist on the right of accusations to be made in English and to defend herself she was briefly cleared, but then brought to trial again by the Abbot, Dean and Mayor, and imprisoned for three weeks.

After this, Kempe continued to York. Here, she had many friends with whom she wept and attended Mass. She encountered further accusation, specifically of heresy, of which she was eventually found innocent by the Archbishop. She returned to Lynn some time in 1418.

She visited important sites and religious figures in England, including Philip Repyngdon (the Bishop of Lincoln), Henry Chichele, and Thomas Arundel, both Archbishops of Canterbury. In the 1420s, Kempe lived apart from her husband. When he fell ill, however, she returned to Lynn to be his nursemaid. Their son, who lived in Germany, also returned to Lynn with his wife. Both her son and husband died in 1431.

=== Pilgrimage to Prussia, 1433–1434 ===
The last section of Kempe's book deals with a journey, beginning in April 1433, aiming to travel to Danzig with her daughter-in-law. From Danzig, Kempe visited the Holy Blood of Wilsnack relic. She then travelled to Aachen, and returned to Lynn via Calais, Canterbury and London, where she visited Syon Abbey.

== Veneration ==
Margery Kempe is honoured in the Church of England with a commemoration on 9 November and in the Episcopal Church in the United States of America together with Richard Rolle and Walter Hilton on 9 November.

== Memorials ==
In 2018, the Mayor of King's Lynn, Nick Daubney, unveiled a bench commemorating Kempe in the Saturday Market Place. The bench was designed by local furniture-maker, Toby Winteringham, and sponsored by the King's Lynn Civic Society.

There is a Margery Kempe Society, founded in 2018 by Laura Kalas of Swansea University and Laura Varnam of University College, Oxford, whose aim is the support and promotion of the scholarship, study and teaching of The Book of Margery Kempe.

In 2020, a statue in honour of Kempe was erected at the entrance of a medieval bridge in Oroso in Northern Spain, on the pilgrimage trail she would have followed to Santiago de Compostela.

A sculpture of Kempe, entitled 'A Woman in Motion', was installed in King's Lynn Minster in 2023. It is made of aluminium and depicts Kempe wearing a wide-brimmed hat typical of medieval pilgrims with her head bowed in prayer.

== Dramatic depictions ==
Kempe's life and her Book have been the subject of several dramatic portrayals:

- The Saintliness of Margery Kempe, written by John Wulp in 1959, and revived in 2018.
- Margery Kempe, written by New Narrative co-founder Robert Glück in 1994 and republished by the New York Review of Books in 2020.

== Modern editions ==
- — (n.d.). Fredell, Joel W. (ed.). The Book of Margery Kempe: A Facsimile and Documentary Edition (Online ed.). Southeastern Louisiana University.
- — (1940). Meech, Sanford Brown (ed.). The Book of Margery Kempe. Early English Text Society original series. Vol. 212. Prefatory note by Hope Emily Allen. Oxford: Oxford University Press. OCLC 16747549. Reprinted in 1982: ISBN 978-0-19-722212-6
- — (1944). Butler-Bowdon, W. (ed.). The Book of Margery Kempe: Fourteen Hundred & Thirty-Six. New York: Devin-Adair. With an introduction by R.W. Chambers.
- — (1986). The Book of Margery Kempe. Translated by Windeatt, Barry. Penguin.
- — (1995). The Book of Margery Kempe: A New Translation. Translated by Triggs, Tony D. Burns & Oats.
- — (1996). Staley, Lynn (ed.). The Book of Margery Kempe. Teaching Association for Medieval Studies Middle English Texts Series. Kalamazoo, Michigan: Medieval Institute Publications. Republished online as — (n.d.). Staley, Lynn (ed.). The Book of Margery Kempe. Teaching Association for Medieval Studies Middle English Texts Series. Rossell Hope Robbins Library at University of Rochester.
- — (1998). The Book of Margery Kempe. Translated by Skinner, John. Image Books/Doubleday.
- — (2001). The Book of Margery Kempe: A New Translation, Contexts and Criticism. Translated by Staley, Lynn. New York: Norton.
- — (2015). The Book of Margery Kempe. Oxford World's Classics. Translated by Bale, Anthony. Oxford: Oxford University Press. ISBN 978-0-19-151015-1.

=== Fictionalised treatment ===
- Perigrinor, Ffiona (2021). Reluctant Pilgrim: The Lost Book of Margery Kempe's Maidservant. Anglepoise Books. ISBN 978-1916309951.
- Mackenzie, Victoria (2023). For thy great pain have mercy on my little pain. London: Bloomsbury Publishing. ISBN 978-1-5266-4788-7.
- MacKenzie, Victoria (Broadcast 30 March 2024). For Thy Great Pain Have Mercy On My Little Pain. BBC Radio 4, Drama on 4.
