= Ego Dormio =

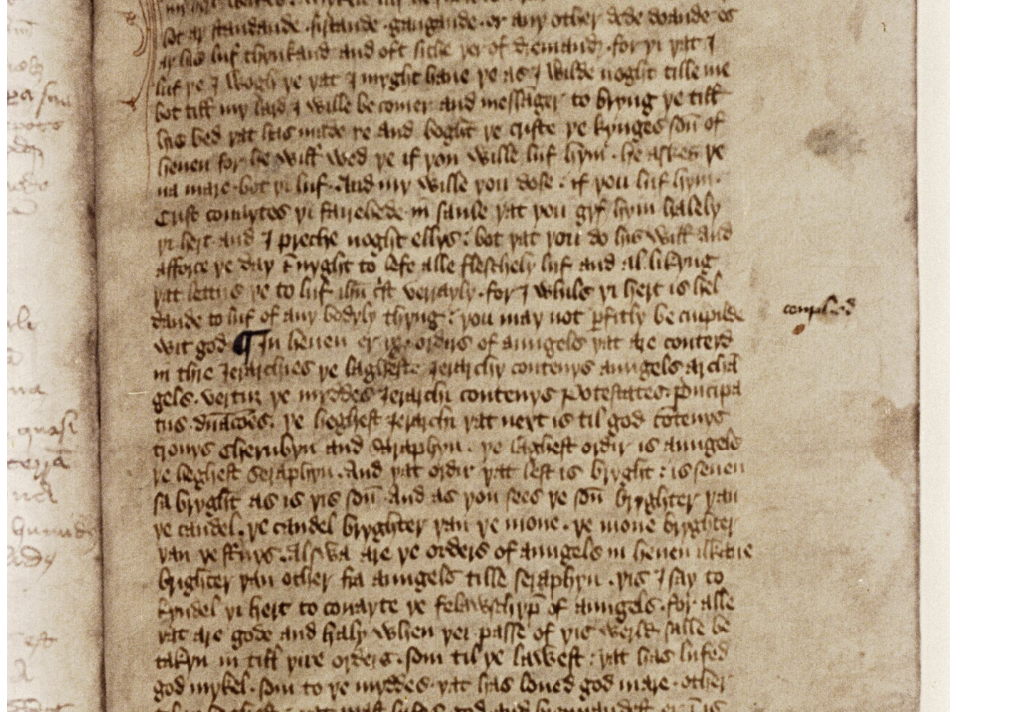
Oxford, Bodleian Library, MS Rawlinson a 389, folio 77r, showing part of Richard Rolle's text Ego Dormio

Ego Dormio is an English-language letter by Richard Rolle thought to date from the 1340s, advising an anonymous woman on how best to love God and gain salvation by proceeding through the "three degrees of love" to arrive at the third and highest, a "contemplative life".

== Name and purpose ==
The text has no name in its manuscripts, so is known by modern scholars by its first two words, which themselves are part of a quotation from the Vulgate Bible translation of the Song of Songs 5.2: "Ego dormio et cor meum vigilat" ("I sleep but my heart is awake"). The bulk of the letter is in prose, but its description of each of the three degrees of love is followed by a poem.

Scholars have debated whether the recipient was a nun or whether she was a layperson considering becoming one, though the manuscript Cambridge, Cambridge University Library, Dd. 5. 64 says that the letter was written for a nun belonging to Yedingham Priory in Yorkshire.

== Manuscripts ==
The work survives in twelve manuscripts (one of which contains two copies), and in a Latin translation in the fifteenth-century manuscript Cambridge, Gonville and Caius College, MS. 140/80, folios 115v–118v. As listed by Dennis Lynch and Margaret G. Amassian, and by Isabel De La Cruz Cabanillas, these are:

city	repository and shelfmark	folios	date
London	British Library, Arundel 507	40r–41r (fragmentary)	c. 1400
London	British Library, Additional 22283 (the Simeon Manuscript)	150v–151v	late fourteenth century
London	British Library, Additional 37790 (the Amherst Manuscript)	132r–135v	fifteenth century
Cambridge	Cambridge University Library, Dd v 64	22v–29r	late fourteenth century
Cambridge	Magdalene College, Pepys 2125	99r–101r	fifteenth century
Oxford	Bodleian Library, Rawlinson A 389 (containing two copies of the text)	71r–81r (fragmentary), 95v–99r	early fifteenth century
Oxford	Bodleian Library, English Poetry a 1 (the Vernon Manuscript)	369r–370v	late fourteenth century
Warminster	Longleat House, Library of the Marquess of Bath, Longleat 29	41v–54v	fifteenth century
Dublin	Trinity College Dublin, 155 (C.5.7)	1r–9v	early fifteenth century
London	Westminster School, 3	225r–231r	c. 1420
Paris	Bibliothèque Sainte Geneviève, 3390	95v–108r	fourteenth century
Tokyo	Takamiya 66 (previously Bradfer-Lawrence 10) (the Gurney Manuscript)	24r–28r	fifteenth century

Although De La Cruz Cabanillas found the content of most manuscripts very similar overall, Lynch and Amassian noted that manuscripts vary extensively in the detail of their wording. They present the following line of verse (which, as it appears in Dd v 64, means "the thorn crowns the King; that pricking is very sore") as an example:

manuscript	text
British Library, Arundel 507	missing (fragmentary manuscript)
British Library, Additional 22283 (the Simeon Manuscript)	Þe kyng crounede with þorn ful sore prikkyng
British Library, Additional 37790 (the Amherst Manuscript)	His heede thay crownede with thornes sare prykknge
Cambridge University Library, Dd v 64	Þe thorne crownes þe keyng; ful sare es þat prickyng
Magdalene College, Pepys 2125	And þis kyng corowned was with þornes sore prikkynge
Bodleian Library, Rawlinson A 389 (text 1)	missing (fragmentary manuscript)
Bodleian Library, Rawlinson A 389 (text 2)	Þe kyng crowned wiþ þorn, ful sore he is prickynge
Bodleian Library, English Poetry a 1 (the Vernon Manuscript)	Þe kyng crouned with þorne, ful sore he is prikked
Longleat House, Library of the Marquess of Bath, Longleat 29	Þe thorne crownes þe keyng; ful sare es þat prickyng
Trinity College Dublin, 155 (C.5.7)	Wiþ þornes þei crouned hym kynge, hard was þat prykkyng þat he suffurd þan of hem
Westminster School, 3	Þe kyng crouned wyth thornes, scharp he was prykkede
Bibliothèque Sainte Geneviève, 3390	And wiþ þorne kene crouned was þi kynge
Takamiya 66 (previously Bradfer-Lawrence 10) (the Gurney Manuscript)	Þe thorne crownes þe keyng; ful sare es þat prickyng

Lynch and Amassian concluded that the manuscript closest to Rolle's lost archetype is Cambridge University Library, MS Dd. 5. 64 (and that the Latin translation in Gonville and Caius College, MS. 140/80 is also a primary witness to Rolle's earliest English text), while De La Cruz Cabanillas noted both MS Dd. 5. 64's consistency with Yorkshire English and the fact that the manuscripts seem to come from Yorkshire and the Midlands, with few or no southern examples.

== Editions and translations ==
=== Editions ===
- Horstmann, C., ed. (1895). Yorkshire writers: Richard Rolle of Hampole, an English father of the church, and his followers. Vol. 1. London: Sonnenschein. pp. 49–61. (Facing-page editions of Cambridge University Library, MS Dd. 5. 64 and Bodleian Library, MS Rawlinson A 389 folios 77r–81r, digitised by the Corpus of Middle English Verse and Prose here)
- Allen, Hope Emily, ed. (1931). English Writings of Richard Rolle: Hermit of Hampole. Oxford: Clarendon Press. pp. 60–72. (Based on Cambridge University Library, MS Dd. 5. 64.)
- Windeatt, B., ed. (1994). English mystics of the Middle Ages. Cambridge English prose texts. Cambridge: Cambridge University Press. pp. 24–33. ISBN 978-0-521-33958-2. (Based on Cambridge University Library, MS Dd. 5. 64, with selected variants from Bodleian Library, MS Rawlinson A 389, and Library of The Marquess of Bath, MS 29.)
- Amassian, Margaret G.; Lynch, Dennis (1981). "The Ego dormio of Richard Rolle in Gonville and Caius MS. 140/80". Mediaeval Studies. 43: 218–249. doi:10.1484/J.MS.2.306271. ISSN 0076-5872. (Facing-page edition of the English text from Cambridge University Library, MS Dd. 5. 64 and the Latin text from Gonville and Caius College, MS. 140/80, pp. 230-49.)

=== Translations ===
- Colledge, Eric, ed. (1962). The mediaeval mystics of England. London: Murray. pp. 143–54. (Modernisation/translation.)
- "Ego Dormio". Richard Rolle: The English writings. Translated by Allen, Rosamund S. London: SPCK. 1989. pp. 132–42. ISBN 0281044015.
