= Richard Rolle =

English hermit and religious writer (c.1300–1349)

- Rolle, detail from "Religious Poems", early 15th century (Cotton Ms. Faustina B. VI)
- Born: c. 1300
- Died: 1349
- Education: University of Oxford
- Known for: Hermit, religious writer, Bible translator

Richard Rolle (c. 1300 – 30 September 1349) was an English hermit, mystic, and religious writer. He is also known as Richard Rolle of Hampole or de Hampole, since at the end of his life he lived near a Cistercian nunnery in Hampole, now in South Yorkshire. In many ways, he can be considered the first English author due to the reported influence (both locally and internationally) of his vernacular works starting soon after his death and continuing for centuries. Indeed, until the nineteenth century northern English medieval religious texts were regularly mis-attributed to him because of his ongoing authority.

== Early life ==
In his works, Rolle provides little explicit evidence about his early life and education. Most, if not all, of our information about him comes from the Office of Lessons and Antiphons that was composed in the 1380s in preparation for his canonisation, although this never came about.

Born into a small farming family and brought up at Thornton-le-Dale near Pickering, he studied at the University of Oxford where he was sponsored by Thomas de Neville, the Archdeacon of Durham. While there, he is said to have been more interested in theology and biblical studies than philosophy and secular studies. He is also described as possessing a fiery temperament. Richard left Oxford at age eighteen or nineteen—dropping out before he received his MA—to become a hermit.

At first Richard chose to live as a recluse in a forest at Thornton but he soon left, fearing his family would restrain his life of solitude. Leaving the family home, he went to Pickering and housed with a squire, John Dalton, for perhaps three years. John had known Richard in Oxford when the two were students. During this time Richard's sister met with him in the woods, and gave him two of her own gowns which he fashioned into a hermit's robe and mantle. She then fled, the legend claims, crying that her brother had gone insane.

== Mystical experiences ==
It was probably while still living with Dalton, two years and eight months after becoming a hermit, Rolle had his first mystical experience. Around a year later, he felt similarly after listening to a choir, and he began to take less interest in all things temporal.

Dalton himself was arrested and his lands confiscated in 1322; the lack of mention of this fact in accounts of Rolle's life makes it likely that he was no longer living with Dalton by this point.

"I felt within me a merry and unknown heat...I was expert it was not from a creature but from my Maker, as it grew hotter and more glad."

— Rolle on his first mystical experience.

It is unclear where Rolle lived from 1321/2 until his death in 1349. One theory is that Rolle spent the early 1320s at the renowned Sorbonne, becoming well-trained in theology, and perhaps being ordained there. This theory is based on the entries in three seventeenth-century manuscripts at the Sorbonne, assumed to be copies of medieval originals, which record a Ricardus de Hampole as being admitted to the Sorbonne in 1320, entering the prior's register in 1326, and noting that he died in 1349 among the sisters of Hampole near Doncaster in Yorkshire. Scholars, however, are divided on the authenticity of this material. Whether or not Rolle studied in Paris, it is probable that most if not all of this time was spent in Richmondshire, either living with his family at Yafforth, or, given the uncertain political conditions in the region at the time, wandering from patron to patron.

== Disciples ==
Around 1348, Rolle knew the Yorkshire anchoress Margaret Kirkby, who was his principal disciple and the recipient of much of his writings and would be important in establishing his later reputation.

== Death ==
Rolle died in Michaelmas 1349 at the Cistercian nunnery at Hampole. Because of his time spent there, he is sometimes known as Richard Rolle of Hampole, or de Hampole. It is not known what his role there was. However he wrote The Form of Living and his English Psalter for a nun there, Margaret Kirkby (who later took up a similar life to Rolle, as an anchoress), and Ego Dormio for a nun at Yedingham. He died of the Black Death, but there is no direct evidence for this. He was buried first in the nuns' cemetery at Hampole. Later records of people making offerings of candles at his shrine show that he was moved first to the chancel and then to his own chapel.

== Works ==
Rolle probably began writing in the early 1330s, and continued until his death – but there is no certain chronology of his various works. He wrote in both Latin and English, with his English works apparently all dating from after c. 1340.

The precise dating of Rolle's works is a matter of much modern dispute. The dates set out by Hope Emily Allen in 1927 have been widely used by later writers, but in 1991 Nicholas Watson set out a rather different vision of the chronology of Rolle's writing.

In one of his best-known works, Incendium Amoris (The Fire of Love), Rolle provides an account of his mystical experiences, which he describes as being of three kinds: a physical warmth in his body, a sense of wonderful sweetness, and a heavenly music that accompanied him as he chanted the Psalms. The book was widely read in the Middle Ages, and described the four purgative stages that one had to go through to become closer to God: described as open door, heat, song, and sweetness. This was part of an important movement in medieval Christianity, in which the feeling of God's presence became central to devotional practice; Rolle is a key figure in the development of affective mysticism. Similarly, as Andrew Kraebel has demonstrated, Rolle claims that his extensive commentary on scripture (in both Latin and the vernacular) is divinely inspired, giving his works an authority beyond that of the purely interpretive and academic (even as he drew on a wide range of Biblical scholarship).

His last work was probably the English The Form of Living, written in autumn 1348 at the earliest. It is addressed to Margaret Kirkby, who entered her enclosure as a recluse on 12 December 1348, and is a vernacular guide for her life as an anchorite.

His works are often classified into commentaries, treatises and epistles. As such, the commentaries are:

- Commentary on the Readings in the Office of the Dead taken from Job. This commentary on nine readings from the Book of Job which form part of the readings for the office of the dead was used extensively by York clergy in the fifteenth century. Surviving in forty-two manuscripts, it was the first of Rolle's works to be printed, in Oxford in 1483. A critical edition and translation by Andrew Kraebel was published in 2025.
- Commentary on the Canticles, a commentary on the first two and a half verses of the Song of Songs. It survives in thirty manuscripts.
- Two Commentaries on the Psalter. One is in Latin, and may belong to the very early period after Rolle left Oxford. The second is an English commentary with translation of the Latin Psalms into English, which was designed to help Margaret Kirkby to understand the doctrines behind the Psalms she was to chant in her anchorage. For nearly 200 years after the Constitutions of Arundel this commentary and translation remained the only authorised vernacular rendering of a portion of the Bible into English; it did not need diocesan permission for its use. It exists in about 20 manuscripts.
- Treatise on Psalm 20, in Latin
- Super Threnos, a commentary on the Lamentations of Jeremiah
- Commentary on the Apocalypse, on the first six chapters of the Book of Revelation
- Other commentaries on the Lord's Prayer, the Magnificat and the Apostles' Creed
- An English explication of the Ten Commandments
- Super Mulierem Fortem, a comment on Proverbs 31:10

Other works include:

- Two English Meditations on the Passion
- Judica me Deus, probably his first work, written around 1330. This survives in four versions, and is an apologia for his hermit lifestyle, making use of the pastoral manual of a fellow Yorkshireman, William of Pagula.
- Contra Amatores Mundi (Against the Lovers of the World), which survives in 42 manuscripts.
- Incendium Amoris (The Fire of Love), written before 1343 (the date of Rolle's marginal note), which survives in 44 manuscripts (15 from the Continent) and one Middle English translation.
- Melos Amoris (or Melum Contemplativorum) (The Melody of Love), which survives in 10 manuscripts.
- The Form of Living, his last work, which survives in 30 manuscripts. It contains 12 chapters and was written at Hampole for Margaret Kirkby when she was living in a cell in Richmondshire.

Three letters survive. All are addressed to single recipients, and contain much similar material:

- Emendatio Vitae (Emending of Life). This was the most popular work of Rolle, with 110 manuscripts (17 from the Continent), and seven independent Middle English translations.
- Ego Dormio, a Middle English prosimetrum, one of two letters written for nuns. (the title comes from the incipit of the work, and is from Song of Songs 5.2)
- The Commandment, one of two letters written for nuns.

Works once thought to be Rolle's:

- While the most popular poem in Middle English, The Pricke of Conscience, was once attributed to him, it is now known to have been written by an anonymous Yorkshire author in the 14th century.
- It is now thought that De Dei Misericordia, a comment on Psalm 88:2, was written by John Waldeby in the later fourteenth century.

== Later reputation and veneration ==
Richard Rolle inspired a flourishing cult, especially in the north of England, which was still active at the time of the English Reformation. Part of this may have been due to the efforts of Margaret Kirkby, who moved to the priory, probably between 1381 and 1383, to be near the body of her master, Rolle. Margaret may have spent the last 10 years of her life here, and between 1381 and 1383 a liturgical office for Rolle, including a great deal of biographical information about him, was written; it likely includes stories about him remembered by older members of the community.

Rolle's works were widely read in the fourteenth and fifteenth centuries, more so even than Chaucer. In the words of Nicholas Watson, scholarly research has shown that "[d]uring the fifteenth century he was one of the most widely read of English writers, whose works survive in nearly four hundred English ... and at least seventy Continental manuscripts, almost all written between 1390 and 1500." Works of his survive in about 470 manuscripts written between 1390 and 1500, and in 10 sixteenth- and early-seventeenth-century printed editions (including the sixteenth-century edition by Wynkyn de Worde). In some manuscripts, Rolle's Commentary on the Psalter is interpolated with Lollard teaching, providing indications of one group who read his work. Rolle's work was not uncontroversial. He was criticised by Walter Hilton and the author of The Cloud of Unknowing; a defence of Rolle's work was written by the hermit Thomas Basset in the late fourteenth century against the attack of an unnamed Carthusian. He was defended by various religious figures, however (one of whom compared his accounts of mystical experience to those of the German Henry Suso), and the Incendium Amoris or Fire of Love is mentioned as one of the books Margery Kempe had a priest read aloud to her to increase her devotion.

The shrine and priory at his burial place of Hampole was dissolved on 19 November 1539. The remains can be seen in an old schoolhouse in Hampole.

Blessed Richard Rolle
- Venerated in: Anglican Communion, Catholic Church
- Feast: 29 September (in the Catholic Church); 20 January
- Attributes: Bearded monk with tonsure, wearing a monks robe and scapular
- Patronage: Writers, academics, those desiring to live an eremitic life, itinerants

Rolle is remembered in the Church of England with a commemoration on 20 January and in the Episcopal Church (USA) together with Walter Hilton and Margery Kempe on 9 November. He is also venerated as a blessed by the Catholic Church on 29 September; however, his cult is little known outside England.

== Modern editions and translations ==
- Andrew Albin, Richard Rolle's Melody of Love: A Study and Translation, with Manuscript and Musical Contexts, (Pontifical Institute of Mediaeval Studies, 2018): contains an alliterative English translation of the Melos amoris, plus a spurious chapter, manuscript marginalia, and associated music; see also the companion website
- Frances Comper, The Life of Richard Rolle, (J. M. Dent, 1928) [Contains an English translation of the Office for Rolle on pp. 301–11. The original Latin text of the Office is in Reginald M. Wooley, The Officium et Miracula of Richard Rolle of Hampole (SPCK, 1919).]
- English Writings of Richard Rolle Hermit of Hampole, ed. Hope Emily Allen (1931)
- The Contra amatores mundi of Richard Rolle of Hampole, introduced and trans. Paul F. Theiner, (University of California Press, 1968) [translation into English, alongside Latin text, of Liber de amore Dei contra amatores mundi]
- Le Chant d'Amour (Melos Amoris), ed. Francois Vandenbroucke, (Cerf, 1971) [This uses the Latin text of the edition of E. J. F. Arnould (1957), alongside a parallel French translation.]
- The Fire of Love, trans. Clifton Wolters, (Penguin, 1972)
- Biblical commentaries: Short exposition of Psalm 20, Treatise on the Twentieth Psalm, Comment on the first verses of the Canticle of Canticles, Commentary on the Apocalypse, trans. Robert Boenig, (Institut für Anglistik und Amerikanistik, Universität Salzburg, 1984)
- Richard Rolle, the English writings, trans., ed., and introduced by Rosamund Allen. Classics of Western Spirituality, (Paulist Press / SPCK, 1988) [includes modern translations of The English Psalter and Commentary, The Ten Commandments, Meditations on the Passion, Ghostly Gladness, The Bee and the Stork, Desire and Delight, Ego Dormio, The Commandment, and The Form of Living]
- Richard Rolle: Prose and Verse, ed. S.J. Ogilvie-Thomson, Early English Text Society 293, (Oxford: OUP, 1988) [This is the standard modern edition of many of Rolle's Middle English works, with the important exception of the English Psalter.]
- Malcolm Robert Moyses, Richard Rolle's Expositio super novem lectiones mortuorum, 2 vols, (Salzburg, 1988)
- The tractatus super psalmum vicesimum of Richard Rolle of Hampole, ed. and trans. James C. Dolan, (Edwin Mellen Press, 1991)
- Richard Rolle: Emendatio Vitae. Orationes ad honorem nominis Ihesu, ed. Nicholas Watson, (PIMS, 1995) [the Latin text of Emendatio Vitae]
- Richard Rolle: Uncollected Prose and Verse with related Northern text, ed. by Ralph Hanna for the Early English Text Society, (Oxford University Press, 2008)
- Richard Rolle: Unprinted Latin Writings, ed. Ralph Hanna (Liverpool University Press, 2020)
- Spahl, Rüdiger, ed., De emendatione vitae. Eine kritische Ausgabe des lateinischen Textes von Richard Rolle mit einer Übersetzung ins Deutsche und Untersuchungen zu den lateinischen und englischen Handschriften (Vandenhoeck & Ruprecht, 2009). [critical edition of the Emendatio Vitae]
- Hudson, Anne, ed., Two Revised Versions of Rolle's English Psalter Commentary and the related Canticles, vols. 1–3, ISBN 9780199669202. Early English Text Society, o.s. 341-3 (Oxford University Press, 2012–4)
- Van Dussen, Michael, ed. Richard Rolle: On Lamentations. A Critical Edition with Translation and Commentary. Exeter Medieval Texts and Studies (Liverpool University Press, 2020)

== See also ==
- Christian mysticism
- Mystical theology
- Henry Suso
- The Cloud of Unknowing
- Walter Hilton
