= Margaret Kirkby =

English anchorite (c. 1322 – 1390s)

- Born: Ravensworth
- Died: 1391-4; Hampole
- Known for: anchorite

Margaret Kirkby (possibly 1322 to 1391–94), was an anchorite of Ravensworth in North Yorkshire, England. She was the principal disciple of the hermit Richard Rolle, and the recipient of much of his writings.

== Life ==
Variations of her name include Kirkeby, Kerkby or Kyrkby. Information about her comes from a biographical office of Rolle written between 1381 and 1383, when Margaret returned to the Cistercian nunnery at Hampole some thirty-four years after Rolle's death. Her recollections were used to provide a biography of Rolle celebrating his sanctity. Miracles reported by pilgrims from across the North of England were also recorded to encourage an unofficial cult.

Margaret was also instrumental in the composition of a liturgical commemoration of the gift of canor, the mystical ecstasy that Rolle celebrated in his writings, which Evelyn Underhill relates to a song of joy. Additional information is provided in a brief life of Rolle written before 1405.

From a small landowning gentry family in Ravensworth, it may be surmised that Margaret first became interested in the solitary life as a young nun of Hampole guided by the convent's spiritual director, Richard Rolle. It was for her that he wrote his English translation and commentary on the Psalms which linked the growth in intensity of religious experience of canor with an understanding of the Psalms. Margaret became an anchoress in East Layton in Richmondshire (possibly in 1348), and her patrons may have been the Fitzhugh family, who owned the local estates.

Rolle wrote The Form of Living for her, the first vernacular guide for recluses since the Ancrene Wisse. Rolle addressed Margaret in the text directly, discussing the problems she would face as a recluse far from his guidance, such as excessive abstinence and the high expectations placed on her by others; and he encouraged her in the attainment of ecstasy by creating for her the verbal equivalent of canor in English. He also presented her with a collection of his works made into a single treatise including: The Form of Living, The Commandment of Love, Ego dormio, prose pieces and lyrics beginning with a rubric reading 'a tract of Richard hermit to Margaret Kirkby recluse on the contemplative life'. The volume, copied c.1430, survives as Longleat MS 27. In The Form of Living and the compilation On the Contemplative Life Rolle demonstrated that his entire mystical system, which celebrated the pre-eminence of canor and the solitary life, was of pastoral relevance to his outstanding disciple, and that he attempted to initiate Margaret into thoughts and spiritual experiences previously available only in his Latin works.

The personal tensions that Margaret felt when leaving Hampole are recounted in the biographical office. She suffered seizures that could be cured only by Rolle who would sit with her at her anchorage window until she slept on his shoulder. After one attack Rolle confessed that even if she were the devil (who had once taken the form of a beautiful woman who had loved him) he would still have held her. After Rolle's death her illness never returned, which gives their story, according to biographer Jonathan Hughes, "a romantic unity to a platonic Yorkshire love story that anticipates Wuthering Heights".

However, Margaret's career was of wider historical significance. In 1357 she obtained the unusual concession of being allowed to change cells and was enclosed in Ainderby so that she could observe the celebration of mass in the parish church. Thirteenth-century episcopal registers had emphasised the recluse's service to God through a penitential, ascetic life, and the achievement of a mystic union with God was mentioned if at all only in passing. The register of John Thoresby, Archbishop of York, confirming the enclosure suggests to Hughes that "in common with the epistles of Rolle, Margaret desired an eremitic life in order that she might fashion herself as a servant of God more freely and more quietly with pious prayers and vigils. Such language indicates how she and Rolle were pioneering a change in the conception of the eremitic vocation".

The enclosure at Ainderby churchyard brought her to the attention of Richard le Scrope, the rector from 1368 and later Archbishop of York. He was probably the medium through which Rolle's writings came to the attention of the Cambridge educated northerners in the service of Thomas Arundel, Archbishop of Canterbury, including Walter Hilton; this led to a pastoral response to Rolle's teachings that provided contemplative instructions for layfolk. Other members of the Scrope family showed an interest in Margaret's servant, Elizabeth. In 1405 Stephen, 2nd Baron Scrope of Masham, left legacies to Elizabeth and the anchoress of Kirby Wiske. Henry, 3rd Lord Scrope, and patron of many anchoresses, owned an autograph volume of Rolle's writings and this may well have come into the possession of the family through Margaret Kirkby; it is through Henry Scrope, the king's treasurer, that the teachings of Rolle and Margaret's example inspired Henry V and Henry, Baron Fitzhugh of Tanfield, to establish the eremitic communities of Sheen Priory and Syon Monastery.

Although she did not write anything herself, Margaret may have influenced Julian of Norwich, author of Revelations of Divine Love. Among Margaret's patrons were Sir Bryan Stapleton of Bedale, lord of the manor of East Layton, who in 1394 bequeathed to her a silver ewer. His brother, Sir Miles Stapleton, moved to Ingham, Norfolk and his son, also Sir Miles, whose daughter became an anchoress, was a patron of Julian of Norwich.

Having returned some time between 1381 and 1383, Margaret lived at Hampole until her death ten years later. To judge from Stapleton's bequest, this occurred in or before 1394. She was buried in the cemetery of Hampole near her master and her remains are presumably in the garden of the old schoolhouse of Hampole on the site of the convent.

Frances Beer argues that from her life "we can surely conclude that [Margaret] was strong, courageous, intelligent, purposeful – deserving of the great esteem in which she was held by her great friend and advisor [Rolle]". Bottomley concurs, arguing that she was independent, intelligent and strong-willed.

== Sources ==
- Jonathan Hughes, 'Kirkby, Margaret (d. 1391x4)', Oxford Dictionary of National Biography, Oxford University Press, 2004 accessed 6 May 2011
