= John of Morigny =

French Benedictine monk

John of Morigny (end 13th century - 14th century) was a French Benedictine monk renowned for his work on the form of medieval ritual magic known as the Ars Notoria.

== Biography ==
Born in the last quarter of the 13th century, John of Morigny began his education at the cathedral school of Chartres. He studied canon law at the University in Orléans. At some point before 1301, he entered the Benedictine Order and became a monk at the abbey of Morigny.

His major work, The Flowers of Heavenly Teaching, has at its core a Book of Prayers, written at the University of Orléans between 1301 and 1308, promising infused knowledge of the liberal arts and other disciplines to operators who obtain the Virgin's license to use it.

After assuming a high-ranking position as provost of Morigny in 1308, John continued to elaborate his work. By 1310 he had added the first version of a Book of Figures, sending out new materials to a growing circle of followers. He also added a Book of Visions, which narrates his journey from sin to redemption as well as that of his sister, Bridget.

== The Flowers of Heavenly Teaching ==
The Book of Prayers in John's Flowers of Heavenly Teaching adapts the structure and goals of a work of late medieval ritual magic known as the Ars Notoria. Both works direct the reader through a long and detailed series of fasts and prayers that promise to give the reader knowledge of the liberal arts and improve memory, eloquence and perseverance.

To this core of prayers, John added a Book of Figures intended to serve as a devotional and meditative focus for the prayers, and an autobiographical account of his visionary experiences which he called the Book of Visions. Here he describes his first vision of the virgin Mary at Chartres, his later magical practices, his encounters with demons, and his ultimate rejection of magic arts under the Virgin's protection.

The Book of Figures was rewritten twice before gaining the Virgin's approval for its release, and rewritten again in 1315 in response to external criticism by certain unnamed "barking dogs" that the figures looked too much like necromancy. According to the Grandes chroniques de France, a copy of the Liber visionum was confiscated and publicly burned at University of Paris in 1323. However various versions of the work survive in manuscript copies with a broad distribution across Europe. Most manuscripts show traces of personalization by users, testifying to the work's ongoing importance after the condemnation.

== Bibliography ==
=== Works ===
- John of Morigny. The Flowers of Heavenly Teaching. Edition and Commentary by Claire Fanger and Nicholas Watson. Toronto: Pontifical institute of Medieval Studies, 2015 (ISBN 978-0-88844-199-7).
- Edition of several manuscripts in Sylvie Barnay, Un moment vécu d'éternité. Histoire médiévale des apparitions mariales (V°-XV° siècles), Thèse, Université de Paris X-Nanterre.
- John of Morigny. "Prologue to the Liber Visionum." Edited and translated by Claire Fanger and Nicholas Watson.

=== Scholarship ===
- Barnay, Sylvie. Le Ciel sur la Terre. Les apparitions de la Vierge au Moyen Âge. Cerf, 2000.
- Fanger, Claire. Rewriting Magic: An Exegesis of the Visionary Autobiography of a Fourteenth-century French Monk. University Park: Penn State University Press, 2015.
- Véronèse, Julien. L'Ars notoria au Moyen Age. Introduction et édition critique. Florence: Sismel - Edizioni del Galluzzo, 2007.

=== External links ===
- Sylvie Barnay, "La mariophanie au regard de Jean de Morigny"
- Manuscripts and manuscript catalogues with entries for Liber florum
