= Ars Notoria =

Medieval textbook of magic

The Ars Notoria (in English: Notory Art) is a 13th-century Latin book of magic (now retroactively classified as a grimoire, an 18th century term thought to originate in Old French), which claims to grant practitioners enhanced mental faculties, communication with angels, and mastery of earthly and celestial knowledge through ritualistic practices and originates from Northern Italy. Combining orthodox religious motifs with esoteric elements, the text gained popularity among medieval scholars, clerics, and students for its promise of accelerated learning.

The work incorporates the only surviving fragment of the Flores Aurei (Golden Flowers), falsely attributed to the Hellenistic philosopher Apollonius of Tyana, and merges it with the Ars Nova (New Art)—a Latin adaptation of the Flores Aurei—alongside additional material by anonymous scribes. The Ars Notoria inspired a broader tradition of ritual magic texts, including John of Morigny's Liber Florum Caelestis Doctrinae (Book of Flowers of Heavenly Teaching), the Opus Operum (Work of Works), and derivative works such as the Ars Brevis (Short Art), Ars Paulina (Pauline Art), and the Solomonic Ars Notoria, quam Creator Altissimus Salomoni revelavit (The Notory Art, Which the Almighty Creator Revealed to Solomon). This corpus persisted into the 17th century, blending ritual magic and medieval scholasticism.

== Book title ==
The lowercase term "notory art" refers to the ritual magic practice or genre, while the capitalized Ars Notoria denotes the eponymous 13th-century grimoire. The text's title is unrelated to the civil-law term "notary." Central to its methodology are notae (Latin: nota, plural notae; "note" or "mark"; verb notare, "to note/mark"), which the text claims to use as conduits for imparting universal knowledge.

Scholars debate the precise definition of notae. Véronèse and Castle interpret them as esoteric knowledge conveyed through cryptic prayers and pictorial diagrams, whereas Skinner and Clark restrict the term to the diagrams alone. These prayers, written in a hybrid of Greek, Biblical Aramaic, and Hebrew, purportedly invoke angelic names. According to the text's mythic narrative, King Solomon formulated them "with the wonderful privilege of divine help," a process scholars suggest may parallel notarikon—a Kabbalistic exegetical technique that extracts hidden meanings from letter combinations.

== Composition ==
=== Mythical account ===
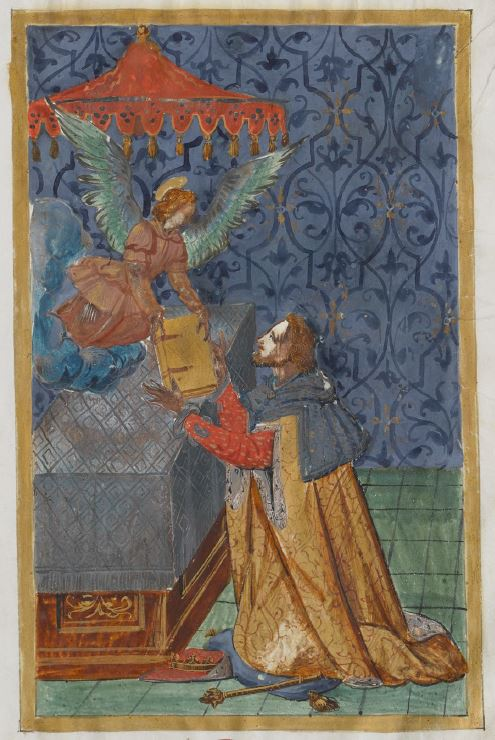
Solomon receives the Ars Notoria from the angel Pamphilius in the Jewish Temple.

The Ars Notoria expands upon the biblical account of King Solomon receiving divine wisdom from God (1 Kings 3:3–15; 2 Chronicles 1:1–12), claiming his vast knowledge derived from the notory art. According to the text, Solomon received golden tablets "above the altar of the Temple" from the angel Pamphilius, who instructed him in the ritual methods, prayers, and symbolic figures (notae) central to the practice.

Following this revelation, Solomon allegedly authored the Liber Florum Caelestis Doctrinae (Book of Flowers of Heavenly Teaching) using a cryptic language blending Hebrew, Chaldean, and Greek, possibly employing the Kabbalistic technique of notarikon. According to the account, the Hellenistic philosopher Apollonius of Tyana later compiled his own derivative work, the Flores Aurei (Golden Flowers), appending commentaries and Latin "prologues"—the deciphered beginnings and summaries of Solomon's cryptic prayers. Apollonius claimed these prologues omitted full translations due to the prayers' linguistic complexity, stating the decoding process was "too long and cumbersome" for readers.

The Latin prayers emphasize Christian orthodoxy, while Solomon's cryptic prayers resemble voces magicae (magical incantations). The accompanying geometric figures, distinct from traditional sigils, remain ritually ambiguous. Scholars propose divergent interpretations:

- Julien Véronèse links them to Neoplatonic sunthemata (divine symbols) or mnemonic devices for inducing visions.
- Stephen Skinner and Daniel Clark similarly emphasize visionary potential.
- Frances Yates, Sophie Page, and Matthias Castle argue they functioned as memory aids (ars memoriae).

The text asserts each figure corresponds to specific academic disciplines or virtues.

Euclid of Thebes (father of Honorius, author of the Liber Iuratus Honorii) and Mani (or Ptolemy, per alternate accounts) allegedly validated the notory art's efficacy. A second divine revelation to Solomon—the Ars Nova (New Art)—reportedly occurred in the Temple after he atoned for mocking the practice.

=== Manuscripts and age ===
The Ars Notoria survives in approximately 50 manuscripts dating from the 13th to the 18th century. Julien Véronèse categorizes these into three textual families:

- Version A: The earliest and shortest recension (13th–14th century).
- Version A2: An intermediary revision (13th–14th century).
- Version B: A later, expanded version with glosses (14th–16th century).

Post-16th-century copies largely reproduce or combine earlier versions, though these later composites remain understudied except for the 17th-century Ars Notoria, quam Creator Altissimus Salomoni revelavit (The Notory Art, Which the Almighty Creator Revealed to Solomon). Véronèse published a semi-critical Latin edition in 2007 based on key exemplars, followed by Matthias Castle's first complete English translation in 2023.

Véronèse dates the Ars Notoria to the late 12th or early 13th century in northern Italy, a conclusion supported by Castle. Scholars such as Stephen Skinner, Daniel Clark, and Castle further propose that the lost Greek original of Apollonius of Tyana's Flores Aurei (Golden Flowers), which the Ars Notoria adapts, may have originated in the Byzantine Empire.

== Structure and content ==
The medieval Ars Notoria derives from the sole surviving fragment of the Flores Aurei (Golden Flowers), spuriously attributed to Apollonius of Tyana. The Flores Aurei comprises three chapters, with the third chapter containing redacted or supplemented material, including the ten prayers of the Ars Nova (New Art)—the earliest derivative text of the Golden Flowers. Scholars note ambiguities in the third chapter's organization, suggesting later interpolations.

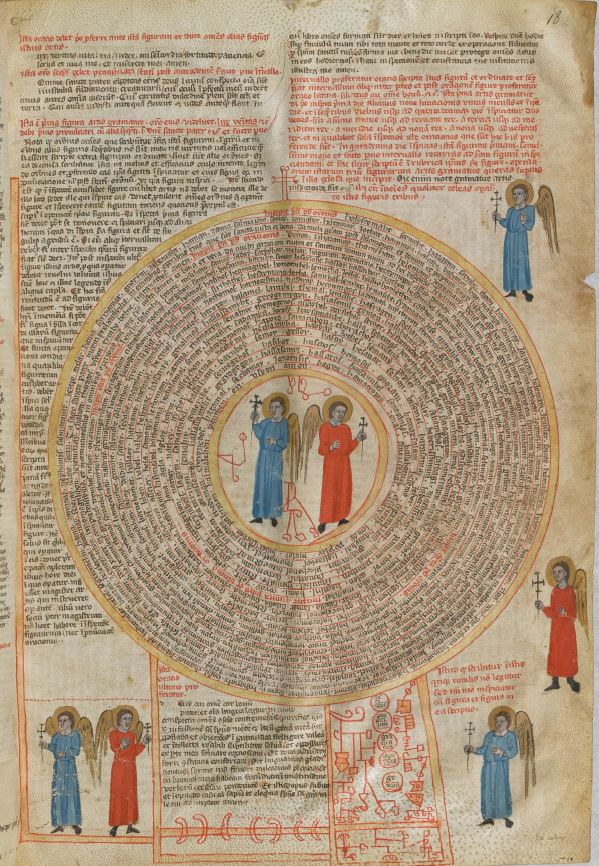
The first figure of grammar. Sacratissima ars notoria, 1360–1375. Latin 9336, f. 18, Bibliothèque nationale de France, Paris.

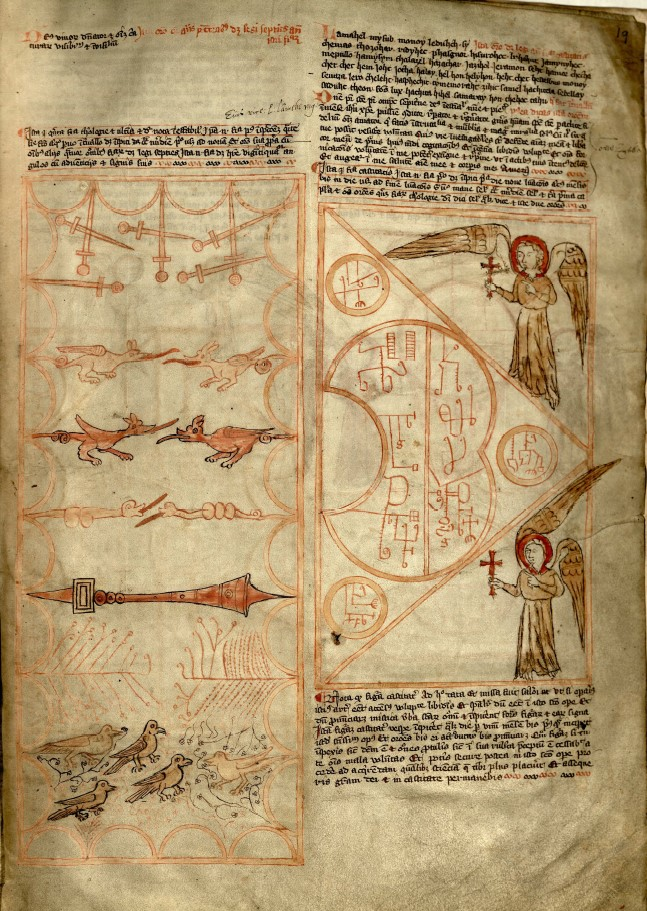
First quarter of the 15th century. Bodley 951, f. 19. University of Oxford, Bodleian Library, Oxford, UK. On the left is the fifth figure of theology. On the right is the figure of chastity.

The Ars Notoria integrates medieval European ritual magic with Christian devotional practices. Its core elements include:

- Angel-mediated dreams: Practitioners seek tutelary angels for knowledge.
- Cryptic prayers: Formulated in hybrid Greek, Hebrew, and Chaldean.
- Lunar and Astrological timing: Rituals aligned with the monthly lunar cycle and certain disciplines are studied under certain zodiac signs of the year. The rituals do not follow the planetary hours but rather the Christian canonical hours.
- Christian asceticism: Fasting, prayer, and almsgiving.

This synthesis of esoteric theurgy and monastic piety reflects Hermetic influences alongside overt orthodoxy, creating a unique fusion of scholastic and mystical traditions.

== Corpus of related writings ==
=== Ars Nova ===
The Ars Nova (New Art), the earliest derivative text of the Flores Aurei (Golden Flowers), comprises a ritual system of ten prayers. These prayers may function independently or complement the broader rituals of the Flores Aurei. Unlike the original text, the Ars Nova imposes no temporal restrictions on its practice and requires fewer procedural complexities, rendering it appealing to practitioners seeking simplicity.

=== Opus Operum ===
The Opus Operum (Work of Works), a 13th-century magical treatise authored anonymously, shares the Ars Notoria's objective of enhancing mental faculties and acquiring scholastic knowledge rapidly. Like its predecessor, it employs cryptic prayers accompanied by Latin "prologues" but introduces a distinct three-month regimen of 32 prayers.

Extant manuscripts often pair the Opus Operum with Version A or A2 of the Ars Notoria. Julien Véronèse published the first critical Latin edition in 2007, followed by Matthias Castle's inaugural English translation in 2023.

=== Liber Florum Caelestis Doctrinae ===
The Liber Florum Caelestis Doctrinae (Book of Flowers of Heavenly Teaching) is a 14th-century magical treatise composed by the French Benedictine monk John of Morigny. Modeled on the Ars Notoria, it promises practitioners mastery of the liberal arts and other disciplines through ritualized prayer. John claimed to have revised and expanded the text under the guidance of the Virgin Mary, seeking to distance it from accusations of necromantic or demonic associations linked to its ritual magic elements.

The first critical Latin edition and scholarly analysis of the Liber Florum Caelestis Doctrinae was published by Claire Fanger and Nicholas Watson in 2015. As of 2023, only excerpts of the text have been translated into English, appearing in specialized academic publications.

=== Ars Brevis ===
The Ars Brevis (Short Art), originally titled Ars Notoria Brevis et Bona (The Good and Short Notory Art), is a mid-14th-century magical treatise. Its title was abbreviated by scholar Julien Véronèse for modern reference. This text should not be confused with Ramon Llull's Ars Brevis (1308), a philosophical work outlining a logical problem-solving system using geometric figures and symbolic alphabets.

Though anonymous, the text is possibly pseudepigraphically attributed to John of Morigny. It is divided into two books:

1. The Blessed Book of John: Focuses on ritual experiments to acquire worldly knowledge, secrets, and enhanced mental faculties through angelic communication via dreams or visions. These rituals blend Catholic liturgy (e.g., votive masses, prayers) with notory art elements like cryptic prayers and symbolic diagrams.
2. The Book of Divine Revelation: Compiles prayers adapted from the Ars Notoria.

Véronèse published the first critical Latin edition in 2004. The inaugural English translation, based on a revised Latin text, appeared in Matthias Castle's 2023 edition.

=== Ars Abbreviata ===
The Ars Abbreviata (Abbreviated Art), a 14th-century magical treatise attributed to Thomas of Toledo, outlines a one-month ritual comprising three prayers and nine symbolic figures. The prayers purportedly grant mastery of the liberal arts, medicine, theology, and jurisprudence, while the figures distill the notory art's core techniques into a condensed practice.

Julien Véronèse published the first critical Latin edition in 2004. The inaugural English translation, based on Véronèse's edition, appears in Matthias Castle's 2023 compilation.

=== Ars Paulina ===
The Ars Paulina (Pauline Art), a 15th-century Italian magical treatise, was retitled Pauline Art [of Seven Figures] by scholar Matthias Castle to distinguish it from the unrelated 17th-century Ars Paulina found in the Lemegeton, the Lesser Key of Solomon, which focuses on evoking celestial and angelic spirits.

The text claims inspiration from the New Testament account of Paul of Tarsus' divine vision of the "third heaven" (2 Corinthians 12:1–4). It positions itself as a continuation of this revelatory experience, framing its rituals as a means to achieve theological enlightenment.

The treatise outlines a three-month ritual program centered on seven symbolic figures, each tied to core doctrines of Christian theology. These figures purportedly grant practitioners fluency in interpreting Scripture and mastering theological concepts.

Julien Véronèse published the first critical Latin edition in 2004. The inaugural English translation, based on Véronèse's work, appears in Matthias Castle's 2023 compilation.

=== Ars Notoria, quam Creator Altissimus Salomoni revelavit ===
The Ars Notoria, quam Creator Altissimus Salomoni revelavit (The Notory Art, Which the Almighty Creator Revealed to Solomon) is a 17th-century Latin composite grimoire compiled anonymously and first published in Heinrich Cornelius Agrippa von Nettesheim's Opera Omnia (c. 1620, vol. 2, pp. 603–660). This derivative text combines Version B of the Ars Notoria, excerpts from the Ars Brevis (Short Art), and original blended material. However, the compilation is incomplete: it omits Version B's glosses, rearranges sections of the original Ars Notoria, and excludes all symbolic figures (notae) central to the practice.

A Protestant scribe excised Catholic elements from the Ars Brevis portions, leaving only one surviving figure. The sole English translation, produced by Robert Turner in 1657, has been reprinted multiple times, including editions by Teitan Press (2015) and Golden Hoard (2019). Scholar Joseph H. Peterson has analyzed discrepancies between Agrippa's Latin compilation and Turner's translation in works published in 1986, 2009, and 2023.

=== Tractatus Artis Notoriae Inaestimabilum Et Propositiones Eius ===
The Tractatus Artis Notoriae Inaestimabilum Et Propositiones Eius (A Treatise of the Inestimable Ars Notoria and Its Propositions) is a 17th-century Latin composite and derivative text and is considered the last in the Ars Notoria tradition. This magical text is held at the Bibliotheca Philosophica Hermetica (BPH), that is, the Philosophical Hermetica Library, also called the Ritman Library, housed inside the Embassy of the Free Mind, shelf marked as M 242 and appears on folios 1-153. This derivative text borrows heavily from the glossed version (Version B), the Ars Brevis, the Ars Nova, and the Agrippa compilation, though it presents new material on alchemy and influences from Kabbalistic literature which was in vogue at the time.

== Editions ==
- Castle, Matthias, trans. Ars Notoria: The Notory Art of Solomon: A Medieval Treatise on Angelic Magic and the Art of Memory. Rochester, VT: Inner Traditions, 2023. (Complete English translation of the Ars Notoria (Versions A and B), Opus Operum (Work of Works), Ars Brevis (Short Art), Ars Abbreviata (Abbreviated Art) attributed to Thomas of Toledo, and Ars Paulina [of Seven Figures].)
- Hockley, Frederick. Ars Notoria: The Notory Art of Solomon. Teitan Press, 2015.
- John of Morigny. The Flowers of Heavenly Teaching. Edited and translated by Claire Fanger and Nicholas Watson. Toronto: Pontifical Institute of Medieval Studies, 2015. ISBN 978-0-88844-199-7. (Critical Latin edition with English commentary.)
- Skinner, Stephen. Ars Notoria: The Method – Version B: Mediaeval Angel Magic. Sourceworks of Ceremonial Magic 12. Singapore: Golden Hoard, 2021. (Includes selections from Robert Turner's 1657 English translation of Ars Notoria, quam Creator Altissimus Salomoni revelavit and translations from Ars Notoria Version B in Bibliothèque nationale de France MS Latin 9336.)
- Skinner, Stephen, and Daniel Clark. Ars Notoria: The Grimoire of Rapid Learning by Magic. Sourceworks of Ceremonial Magic 11. Singapore: Golden Hoard, 2019. (Reprint of Robert Turner's 1657 English translation of Ars Notoria, quam Creator Altissimus Salomoni revelavit.)
- Véronèse, Julien. L’Ars notoria au Moyen Âge: Introduction et édition critique. Micrologus Library 21. Florence: SISMEL–Edizioni del Galluzzo, 2007.
- Véronèse, Julien. L’Ars notoria au Moyen Âge et à l’époque moderne: Étude d’une tradition de magie théurgique (XIIe–XVIIe siècle). 2 vols. PhD dissertation, Université de Paris, 2004.
