= Hope Emily Allen =

American scholar

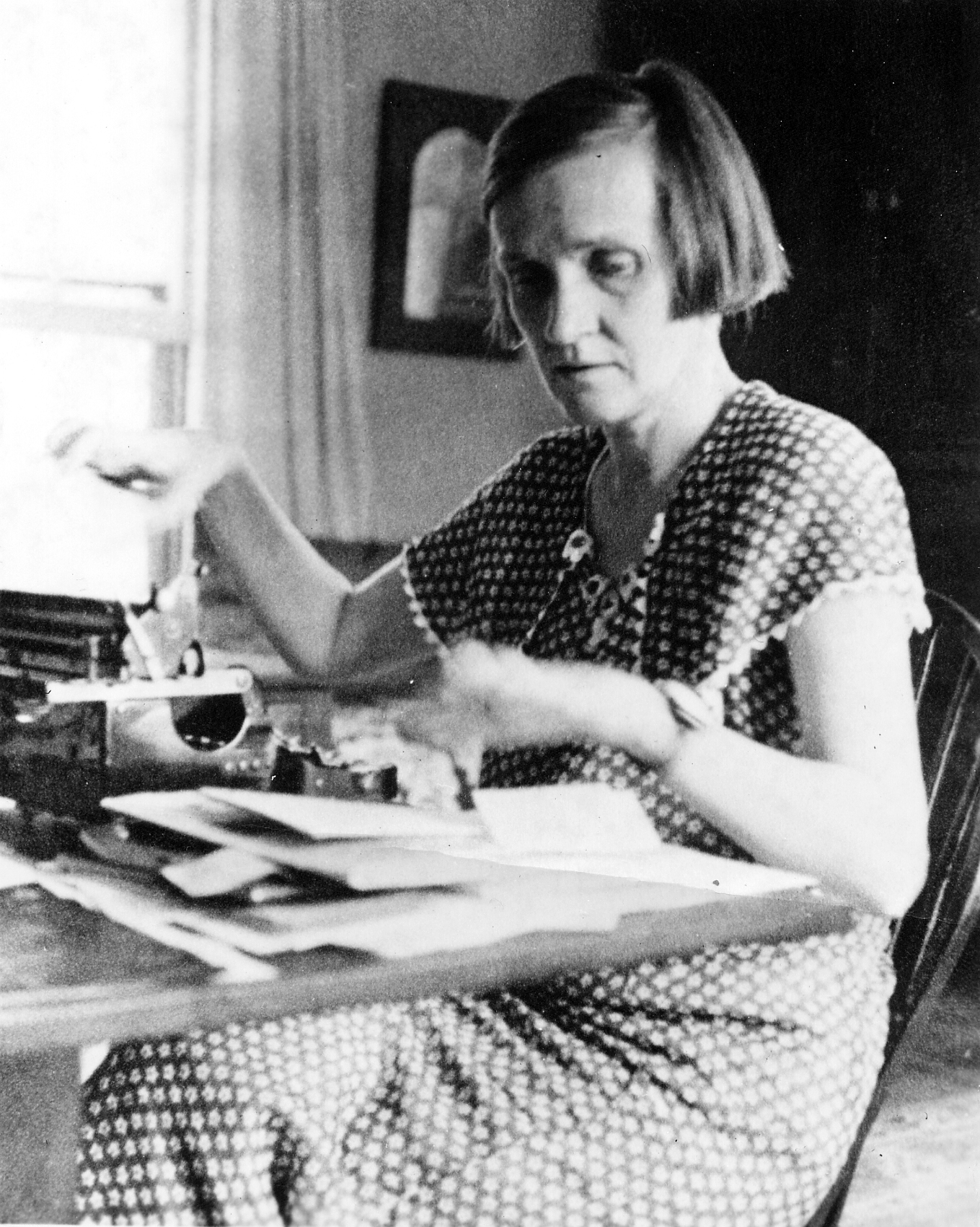
- Born: November 12, 1883; Kenwood, New York, U.S.
- Died: July 1, 1960 (aged 76); Oneida, New York, U.S.
- Education: Bryn Mawr College; Radcliffe College; Newnham College, Cambridge
- Occupation: Scholar of medieval history

Hope Emily Allen (1883–1960), was an American medievalist who is best known for her research on the 14th-century English mystic Richard Rolle and for her discovery of a manuscript of the Book of Margery Kempe.

== Early life and education ==
Hope Emily Allen was born in Kenwood, Madison County, New York, on November 12, 1883. Her parents, Henry Grosvenor Allen and Portia Allen (born Underhill), had previously lived for a time in the Oneida Community, an experimental group based on socialist principles that broke up in 1880. Allen spent much of her life living on property that originally belonged to the community. She also lived in Niagara Falls, Ontario, Canada, attending Niagara Falls (Ontario) Collegiate.

Allen undertook her undergraduate studies at Bryn Mawr College, with special interests in the study of Middle English literary texts, taught by medievalist Carleton Brown. She graduated in 1905 as one of "The Ten" top scholars. The next year she completed graduate work, also at Bryn Mawr, in English literature and Greek, earning a master's degree. After Bryn Mawr, she went to Radcliffe College to begin studying for her PhD, and in 1910 she enrolled at Newnham College, Cambridge, for a semester to study English literature. That semester eventually became a period of three years.

After a period of illness, Allen returned to Oneida to recover. In September 1913, her mother died, and Allen assumed care of her father. During World War I, she remained in the United States, working on Rolle, frequently writing to her friends in England, and sending them care packages. On July 7, 1920, her father died. By 1921, Allen had returned to London, lodging at 116 Cheyne Row with a Cambridge friend, scientist-artist Marietta Pallis.

== Scholarly career and feminism ==
Allen's time in Britain allowed her to make a great number of personal and academic connections, as well as experience European culture. She was closely connected with a group of other women scholars on Cheyne Walk in Chelsea, including Joan Wake and Dorothy Ellis. During her time in Britain, she pursued her two lifelong goals: medieval scholarship and feminism. Allen had great concern for women's values and identity, and continued to fight for these issues throughout her life.

Allen described herself as an "independent scholar," and she never accepted an academic teaching appointment. This independence allowed her to research more freely, so that she could closely examine texts that had not received recognition before. It may also have worked against her, in the lack of public credit for her work, and in her omission from later cultural and historical studies.

Her writing falls into three overlapping groups: her early work on the Ancrene Riwle; her insight into the study of Richard Rolle; and her research on the cultural background of The Book of Margery Kempe. Themes in her work include the spirituality of women in the late Middle Ages (Ancrene Riwle), and the contradictions and impossibilities in the work of Richard Rolle. In work on both the Ancrene Riwle and Margery Kempe, she identified a need for a "history of culture", extending both the range of material to be considered, and the kinds of questions to be asked.

In 1910, she presented evidence that Rolle was not the author of The Prick of Conscience, in the Radcliffe Monographs. In 1927 she published Writings Ascribed to Richard Rolle, Hermit of Hampole, and Materials for His Biography in the third volume of the Monograph Series of the Modern Language Association of America. In 1931, she published English Writings of Richard Rolle, Hermit of Hampole.

In 1934, Allen identified the one surviving manuscript of the Book of Margery Kempe, an autobiographical account of a Norfolk mystic and pilgrim, mentioned, with a few pages of extracts, by Wynkyn de Worde about 1501. It was found in a cupboard at Southgate House, Chesterfield, the home of Lt.-Col. William Erdeswick Ignatius Butler-Bowdon. Albert Van de Put of the Victoria and Albert Museum borrowed it, and showed it to Hope Emily Allen, who was visiting Britain at the time.

Allen returned to the United States in the 1930s, living in Ann Arbor, Michigan, where she continued to pursue her research and writing, and to carry on correspondence with friends and scholars such as Joan Wake. Allen was the assistant editor of the Early Modern English Dictionary at the University of Michigan from 1933 to 1938.

Allen asked Sanford Brown Meech, a colleague at Michigan, to collaborate with her in editing The Book of Margery Kempe. However, Meech began mistreating Allen, and attempted to take over the edition, and eventually, the work was issued in two volumes, as the collaborators could not agree' on account of Meech's misogynistic attitude to Allen. Volume I of The Book of Margery Kempe, with notes by Hope Emily Allen, was published by the Early English Text Society in 1940. Sadly, although Allen planned and worked extensively on a second volume of her magnum opus; it was never completed. Nevertheless, Allen promoted a secular, feminist criticism of the Book of Margery Kempe, raising issues of the materiality of the text and its cultural production in addition to its content. Her work significantly prefigures current scholarship on the text.

== Later life ==
Allen apparently suffered from severe osteoarthritis in later life, which made it difficult for her to travel and work. It was a painful comparison to her earlier active life, of which she had written, "when libraries were closed I walked all day in [King's] Lynn, poking into all the corners both of streets and churches. I am a great believer in the living picture as a stimulus to study."

She eventually returned to her hometown of Oneida, New York, and spent the last years of her life at the Mansion House in Kenwood. She died on July 1, 1960.

== Awards and honors ==
In 1929 Allen was awarded the Rose Mary Crawshay Prize of the British Academy for her work on Richard Rolle. In 1946 she was awarded an honorary doctorate in humane letters from Smith College. In 1948, she was inducted into the Medieval Academy of America. In 1960 she was "designated one of the seventy-six most distinguished graduates of Bryn Mawr College".

A significant collection of materials relating to Hope Emily Allen's life can be found at the Bryn Mawr College Library. The papers consist primarily of research notes by Allen, photostats and typescripts of manuscripts, and professional correspondence. Topics include the Book of Margery Kempe, the Ancrene Riwle, and Richard Rolle.
