= Nicholas Watson (academic) =

English-Canadian medievalist, literary critic and religious historian

Nicholas Watson is an English-Canadian medievalist, literary critic, religious historian, and author. He is Henry B. and Anne M. Cabot Professor of English at Harvard University.

== Education and early career ==
Nicholas Watson was raised in Winchester, England. After an undergraduate education at the University of Cambridge and graduate work with Vincent Gillespie at Oxford, he began his scholarly career with a 1987 dissertation at the University of Toronto on the Yorkshire hermit Richard Rolle. Watson is Henry B. and Anne M. Cabot Professor of English at Harvard; before joining the faculty at Harvard he taught at the University of Western Ontario from 1990 to 2001.

== Career ==
Watson has written on vernacularity, gender, religious censorship, ritual magic, and mystical literature; he has also edited and translated important works from medieval Latin and Middle English. He is credited with introducing the concept of "vernacular theology" to literary and religious studies. His scholarship has explored figures such as Julian of Norwich, William Langland, Marguerite Porete, Geoffrey Chaucer, John of Morigny, Richard Rolle, the Pearl Poet, and Archbishop Thomas Arundel.

== Awards ==
In 1990 he was awarded the John Charles Polanyi Prize. His research has been supported by the Canadian Social Sciences and Humanities Research Council, the Guggenheim Foundation, the American Council of Learned Societies, and the Radcliffe Institute for Advanced Study. In 2016 he was named a Fellow of the Medieval Academy of America.

== Works ==
- Richard Rolle and the Invention of Authority (1991)
- (with Anne Savage) Anchoritic Spirituality: Ancrene Wisse and Associated Works (1991)
- "Censorship and Cultural Change in Late-Medieval England: Vernacular Theology, the Oxford Translation Debate, and Arundel's Constitutions of 1409" (1995)
- Richard Rolle: Emendatio vitae and Orationes ad honorem nominis Ihesu (1995)
- (with Jocelyn Wogan-Browne, Andrew Taylor, and Ruth Evans) The Idea of the Vernacular: An Anthology of Middle English Literary Theory, 1280–1520 (1999)
- "The Middle English Mystics" in The Cambridge History of Medieval English Literature, ed. David Wallace (1999)
- (with Fiona Somerset) The Vulgar Tongue: Medieval and Postmedieval Vernacularity (2003)
- (with Jacqueline Jenkins) The Writings of Julian of Norwich: A Vision Showed to a Devout Woman and A Revelation of Love (2006)
- (with Fiona Somerset) Truth and Tales: Cultural Mobility and Medieval Media (2015)
- (with Cristina Maria Cervone) What Kind of Thing Is a Middle English Lyric? (2022)
- Balaam's Ass: Vernacular Theology before the English Reformation (2022)
