= The Book of Margery Kempe =

15th-century autobiography

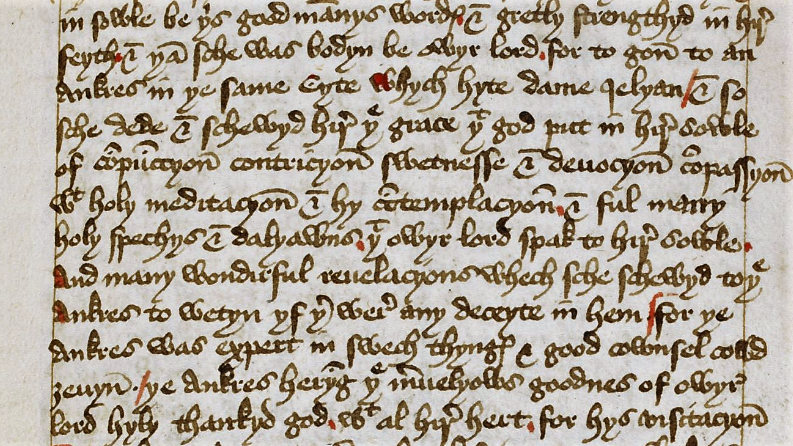
Manuscript of The Book of Margery Kempe, chapter 18 (excerpt)

The Book of Margery Kempe is a medieval text attributed to Margery Kempe, an English Christian mystic and pilgrim who lived at the turn of the fifteenth century. It details Kempe's life, her travels, her accounts of divine revelation including her visions of interacting with the Trinity, particularly Jesus, as well as other biblical figures. These interactions take place through a strong mental connection forged between Kempe and said biblical figures. The book is also notable for her claim to be present at key biblical events such as the Nativity, shown in chapter six of Book I, and the Crucifixion.

== Content and re-discovery ==
Kempe's book is written in the third person, employing the phrase "this creature" when referring to Kempe in order to display humility before God. It is structured into two "books" totaling 6,047 lines. The first book contains 5,246 lines and the second book has 801 lines. Kempe claimed to be illiterate and her book was dictated to two scribes who set it down. Modern editions are based on a long-sought full manuscript copy by a scribe named Salthows sometime in the fifteenth century of presumably the original work, which is lost or destroyed. Recent research suggests that Salthows may have been Richard Salthouse, a monk at Norwich's cathedral priory.

This oldest known copy, was queried as to its beguiling contents by its owner Lt-Col. W.E.I. Butler-Bowdon of Southgate House, Derbyshire in about 1933 and was identified as Margery Kempe's book by Hope Emily Allen in December 1934, who was instrumental in the publication of the second modern, and first scholarly, edition of the text. In June 1980, this 15th century copy was bought by the British Library from his son Captain Maurice R. Butler-Bowdon (1910-1984), at a Sotheby's auction.

For 400 years scholars glimpsed the book through pamphlets by Wynkyn de Worde in 1501 and Henry Pepwell in 1521 which only contained excerpts. Kempe's book is widely cited as the first autobiography in English. However, scholars for decades disagree on whether it can accurately be called such, or more accurately a confession of faith, or autohagiography. Literary academics, readers and teachers often conceptualize Margery Kempe as a character or persona – instead of seeing the book as purely autobiographical, similarly to how Geoffrey Chaucer as an author differs from Chaucer the character in The Canterbury Tales.

== Manuscript features ==
The Book of Margery Kempe remains in the possession of the British Library. The manuscript has been digitised and can be viewed online. Written in Gothic Cursive hand, it consists of 124 folio pages, measuring 205 x 140mm. Four distinct hands have been identified writing annotations and making illustrations within the marginalia of the manuscript, the most recognizable script being one made in red ink. It could be concluded through the effort of making of these annotations that Kempe's book was frequently used and valued as a text, perhaps its contents viewed with admiration for its religious fervor. The underlining and highlighting by various hands demonstrates the aspects of her text that are valued, perhaps even to draw away from Kempe's more radical and disruptive facets.

== Manuscript, modern editions and translations ==
- "British Library Catalogue: Add. MS 61823: The Book of Margery Kempe".
- Kempe, Margery. The Book of Margery Kempe, ed. Sanford Brown Meech, with prefatory note by Hope Emily Allen (EETS. Original series; no. 212). London: Oxford University Press, 1940.
- Kempe, Margery. The Book of Margery Kempe, trans. Barry Windeatt. Harmondsworth: Penguin, 1985.
- Kempe, Margery. The Book of Margery Kempe: The Autobiography of the Wild Woman of God, trans. Tony D. Triggs. Barnhart: Liguori Publications, 1995; Tunbridge Wells: Burns and Oates, 1995.
- Kempe, Margery. The Book of Margery Kempe, ed. Lynn Staley. Kalamazoo: Medieval Institute Publications, 1996.
- Kempe, Margery. The Book of Margery Kempe: A New Translation, trans. John Skinner. New York: Image Books/Doubleday, 1998.
- Kempe, Margery. The Book of Margery Kempe: A New Translation, Contexts and Criticism, trans. and ed., Lynn Staley. New York: Norton, 2001.
- Kempe, Margery. The Book of Margery Kempe, trans. Anthony Bale. Oxford: Oxford University Press, 2015

== Manuscript ==
- "British Library Catalogue: Add. MS 61823: The Book of Margery Kempe". London: British Library. Archived from the original on 15 August 2023.
