= Elizabeth Coppin =

British artist (1768–1812)

- Born: 1768; Norfolk , England
- Died: 1812 (aged 43–44)
- Known for: Painting

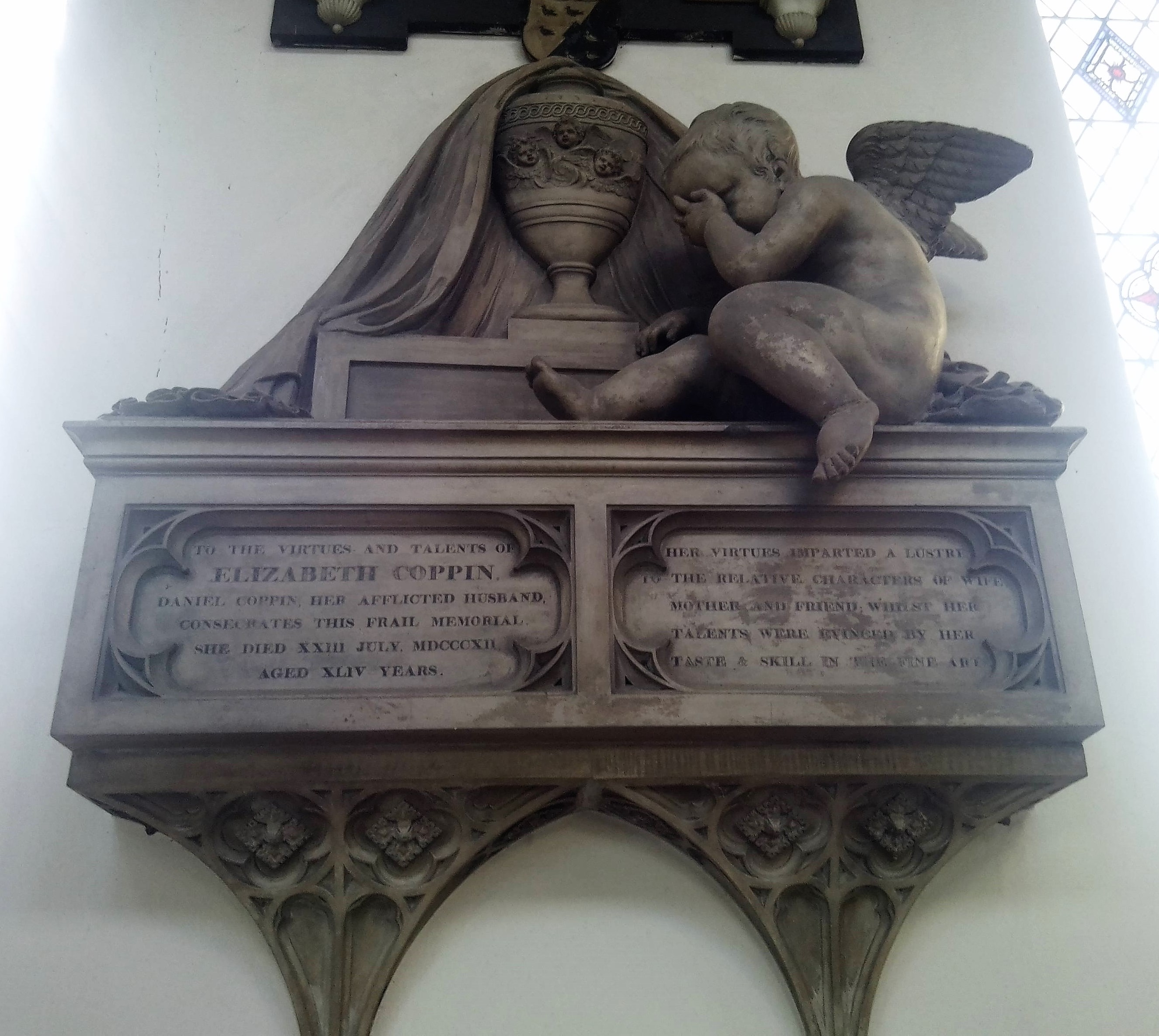
The memorial to Elizabeth Coppin in St. Stephen's Norwich

Elizabeth Coppin, née Clyatt (1768–1812) was an English painter

Born in Norfolk as Elizabeth Clyatt, she was married to artist Daniel Coppin, one the founding members of the Norwich School of Painters; the couple were the parents of still life painter Emily Stannard.

In 1802 the Society of Arts, Manufactures and Commerce awarded her the greater Silver Pallet for a copy in pastel of a work by Salvator Rosa, and in 1808 she received a gold medal for a copy in oils of a painting by Teniers. She produced a mural at the church of St Stephen the Protomartyr in Norfolk, in which church a monument was erected to her memory by her husband; this remains the only source of biographical information about her. Coppin is known to have produced portraits. Her pastels have not survived, but an oil copy of The Cottage Door by Thomas Gainsborough is owned by the Norwich Castle Museum and Art Gallery.
