= Medieval women's Christian mysticism =

Historical lens or theory

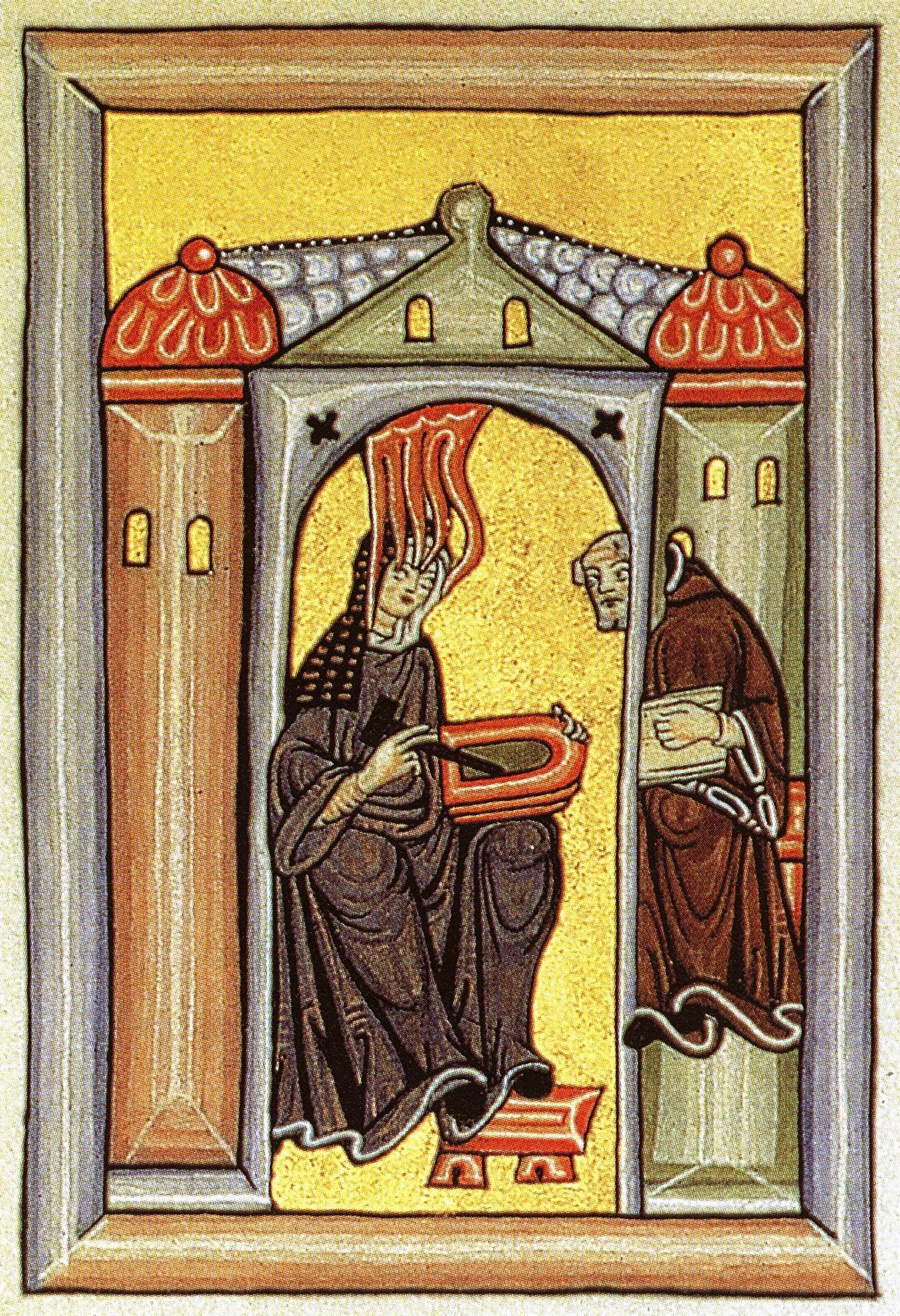
Illumination from Hildegard of Bingen's Scivias depicting her receiving a vision

Medieval women's Christian Mysticism encompasses the expressions of mysticism amongst Christian medieval women, their lives, and their significant contributions to their communities' theology and cultural psyche.

The life of a medieval woman mystic was spent seeking unity with God in a series of stages. Beginning with a purge of the spirit in which mystics would released themselves from earthly indulgences and attachments. Mystics sought to imitate the suffering of Christ in order to gain an understanding through experience. Through contrition, the medieval woman mystic faced suffering because of her past sins, and the mercy of God was revealed to her through penitence. During the compassion stage of suffering, the pain experienced by the medieval woman mystic "revealed the believer's love of Christ, fostered unity with Christ and the world, and began to draw the believer beyond the physical Jesus who suffered on the Cross to understand the immensity of the love that motivated Christ in the world to suffer on humanity's behalf". Medieval women mystics experienced visions during what medieval historians refer to as the Illuminative stage of their lives that contained instructions from God and would communicate their revelations in written form.

== Medieval women as visionaries ==
Visions occurred to the mystic in the form of raptures or ecstasies, out-of-body experiences during which the mystic was in a state of immobility, unresponsive to and disconnected from the outside world. The visions of most female mystics during the Middle Ages came in the form of mental images. Medieval women mystics were considered prophets by their communities. During the Middle Ages, medieval interpretations of Biblical passages such as Corinthians 14:34 resulted in women being excluded from the Church's hierarchy and lacking the authority to impart Biblical wisdom. However, medieval women were thought to be more susceptible to experiencing a rapture based on Galen's writings on humor theory. Medieval theologians interpreted the feminine softness and coldness described by Galen as evidence that women were more impressionable to visions. Also, the Christian idea that God used humble beings as his vessels supported the ability of Medieval women to act as mystics.

== Authorization and legitimacy ==
The legitimacy of the medieval woman mystic was gained through partnership with the Catholic Church and observed proof of physical suffering and deterioration. Medieval women mystics lived ascetic lives of severe fasting, abstinence, and isolation lifestyle choices that became physically debilitating and in some instances resulted in death.

Medieval women mystics also used self-denigration in the published versions of their visions in order to both gain clerical approval of their revelations and showcase their status as God's humble servants.

=== Physical proof ===
The proof of a medieval woman's mystical ability was shown through physical suffering due to mortification of the flesh and by the wounds that symbolized the mystic's connection to Christ. The presence of the Stigmata on a mystic's body served as divine evidence of her ability to communicate with God. Another sign of mystical ability was observed bleeding on Fridays during the hour of the Crucifixion. By the end of the Middle Ages the physical deterioration of the woman mystic's body was considered proof of her sanctity. Medieval women mystics were marked as special instances of God's grace because of their choice to suffer.

=== Support from the Catholic Church ===
Medieval women mystics were endorsed by the Church to reaffirm orthodox religion through their visions. The Latin church of the Middle Ages fought heresy with Scholasticism and the Inquisition and placed emphasis on the sacraments and models of exemplary religiosity. Mystics supported the Catholic Church's teaching of suffering on others' behalf in visionary journeys to Purgatory where they encountered suffering souls. Medieval women mystics believed that their physical mortifications served as purgation for the sinful dead. Through prayer medieval women mystics released souls from Purgatory.

Medieval women mystics showed particular obedience to their confessor. Confession became a key part of female piety because of the Fourth Lateran Council of 1215 which made confession a more integral part of medieval life. During confession, female mystics would discuss their revelations and establish a partnership with their confessor, who often circulated the accounts of the mystic's revelations throughout the Christian community. The authorization of the Catholic Church distinguished the heretic from the pious mystic. The mystic Marguerite Porete was burned for heresy by the inquisition in France in 1310 after her text The Mirror of Simple Souls was deemed unorthodox. Conversely, Hildegard of Bingen became an ally of Pope Eugenius III and Bernard of Clairvaux in their fight against German heresy in 1147. According to Petroff, Medieval women mystics "inspired Christian leaders who synthesized Christian tradition and proposed new models for the Christian community."

== Mysticism in Beguine communities ==
Beguine communities originated in Northern Europe during the twelfth century. The Beguines were groups of women who lived together, supported themselves through manual labor, provided charity to the sick and the poor, and devoted their lives to spiritual growth. The Beguines also performed acts of penitence such as self-flagellation, fasting, and vigils. The Beguine communities were supported by Pope Gregory IX during the thirteenth century and sparked a resurgence in female religiosity. Beguine mystics were seen as the brides of Christ and living saints during the Middle Ages.

== Growing suspicion in the later Middle Ages ==
Toward the end of the Middle Ages, from the thirteenth century onward, women mystics faced greater scrutiny due to the growing prominence of inquisitional procedure. In Germany during the fourteenth century, the clergy began to greatly restrict the religious lives of women. The Council of Vienne, in 1311, condemned religious women who preached and lived outside a monastery without the direct supervision of a cleric, thus putting an end to the Beguine movement. Scholastics in the universities began to propose that inquisitional processes should be employed to weed out heresy among women mystics. Jean Gerson, a chancellor of the University of Paris, believed the church's corruption and laxity was the cause of widespread acceptance of female mystics. Gerson wanted to create a permanent post of the Inquisition that investigated mystics and their visions. In the Rhineland and Southern France from 1318 to 1328, Dominican inquisitors began to burn Beguines and other religious women at the stake in response to the papal bull Quum Inter Nonnullos of John XXII which condemned poverty-based religiosity. By the end of the fifteenth century, the mystical marriage of the medieval woman mystic's marriage with Christ had come to be viewed as a copulation with devil by the Dominicans.

== Some notable medieval women mystics ==
=== Catherine of Siena (1347–1380) ===
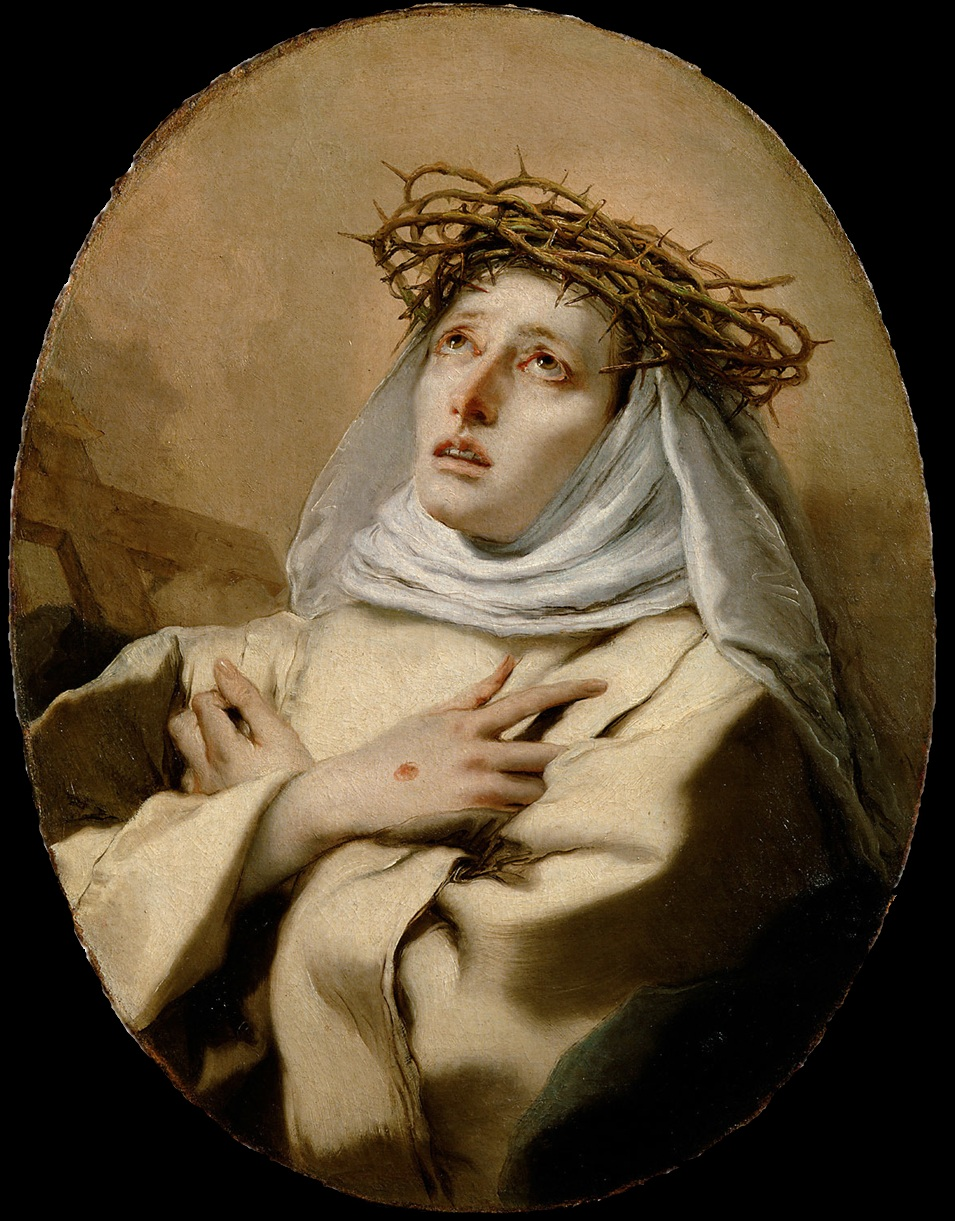
Catherine of Siena

Catherine of Siena was the daughter of a lower-class wool dyer and lived through the Black Death. She vowed her virginity to God at the age of seven. At fifteen she cut her hair in protest of marriage. After she was scarred by a case of smallpox at seventeen, her parents allowed her to join a third-order Dominican group called the Mantellate due to her reduced marriage prospects.

Catherine chose to remain at home and it was there, at the age of twenty, that she experienced a "mystical espousal" where she became one with Christ. Catherine was an active minister to the poor and sick and became renowned. In 1370, she had a "mystical death" during which she and Christ exchanged hearts. During the Babylonian Captivity, Catherine prophesied a three-step plan to re-establish a moral and peaceful Christendom: the return of the papacy to Italy, the establishment of peace among the warring Italian factions, and a Crusade to the Islamic world. In 1374, the mystic was brought to Florence and examined on her beliefs and activities by the General Chapter of her order. On April 1, 1375, Catherine had a vision in which she received the stigmata and prophesied the Western Schism which would occur in 1379. In 1376 she helped convince Pope Gregory XI to return to Rome. The years before her death she lived in Rome as an advisor to the pope. She died in 1380 at the age of 33.

In 1378 Catherine of Siena published her visions in the Dialogue. The Dialogue tells of a conversation between Catherine and God where God explains that Christ's crucifixion created a bridge between earth and heaven. Christians can reach heaven by walking across the bridge which requires removing themselves from earthly indulgences and acquiring a love of virtue.

=== Margery Kempe (circa 1373-after 1439) ===
Margery Kempe was born in King's Lynn in Norfolk, England. She married John Kempe at the age of twenty and suffered a health- afflicting pregnancy with her first child. She also owned and operated her own brewery and mill until they failed and she turned to devoting herself completely to her faith. During her marriage she heard voices and believed herself to be tortured by demons. One day she had a vision of Christ sitting beside her; from that point on, Margery was rejuvenated with a great passion for her faith but did not act upon this passion until after she experienced years of temptations. Margery went on pilgrimages to the Holy Land, Assisi, Rome and Germany. In one of her visions, she saw herself as a maid and servant to Saint Anne and then the Virgin Mary whom she accompanied to Bethlehem with Saint Joseph; she was then present for the birth of Christ. In another vision, Jesus granted Margery the right to not fast on Fridays so that her husband would agree to allow her to choose a life of celibacy. When her husband had a near fatal fall down the stairs, God answered her prayers, allowing her husband to live, but required that she looked after him. Other than her visions, a large part of Kempe's mystic identity was based on her displays of "passionate, full- bodied, audible, and sermon- disrupting wailing". Nearly all of what is known of Margery's life is due to the publication of her autobiography The Book of Margery Kempe.

=== Julian of Norwich (1342 – after 1416) ===
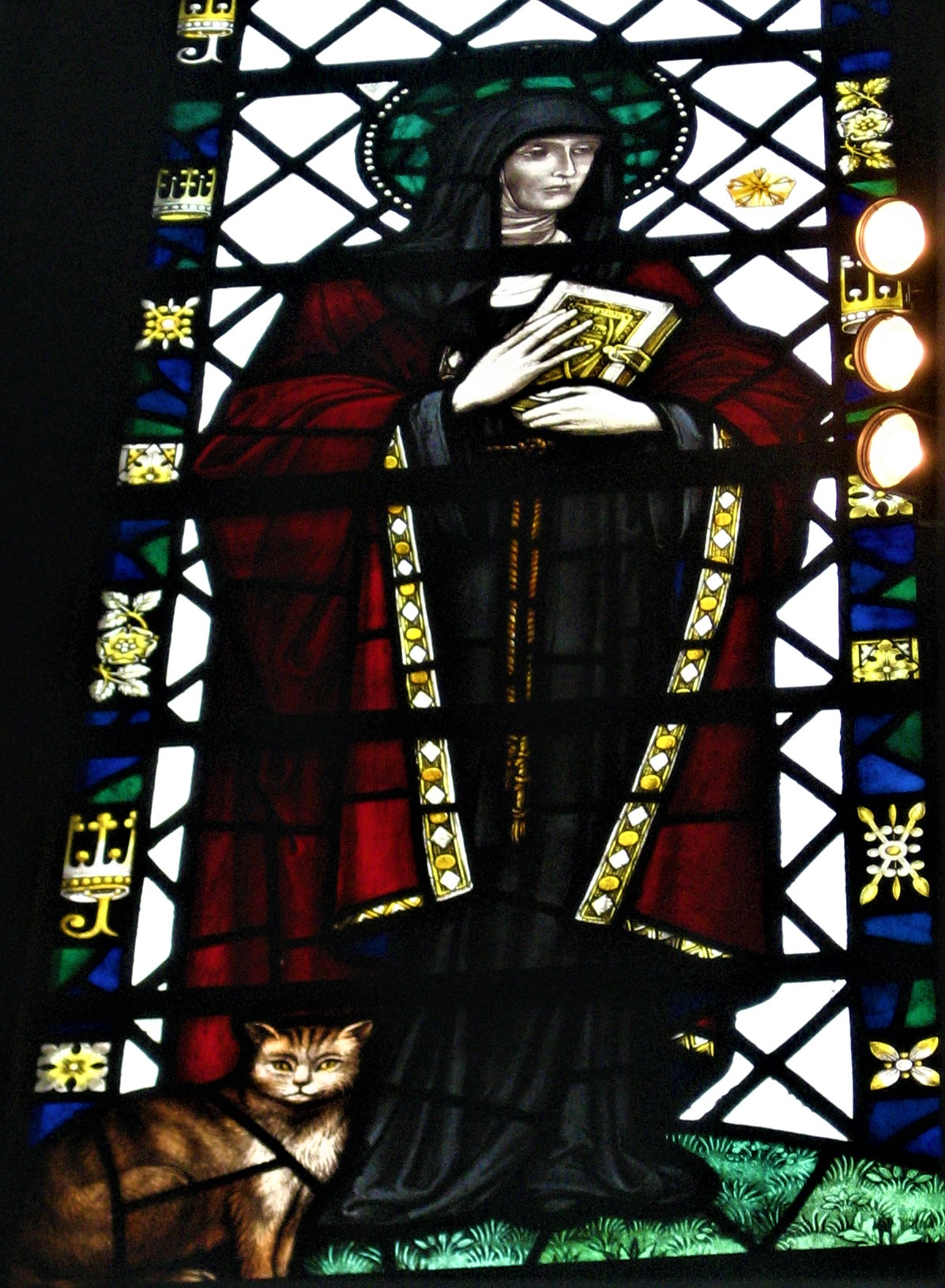
Julian, as depicted in a window in Norwich Cathedral

Julian of Norwich was an English anchoress at St Julian's Church, Norwich. Little is known of her, but she lived during the Black Death and the Great Schism. Julian lived in a cell which was a small house isolated from the community with few rooms and a garden used for sustenance.

In 1373 Julian experienced the "Showings", which was a mystical experience in which numerous revelations and images were revealed to her at one time. In the "Showings" Julian witnessed the Crucifixion, had a conversation with Christ, then witnessed the Virgin Mary during the Annunciation, and saw an image of the devil. Another vision of Julian is of the Lord and a servant who in attempting to leave to do God's will stumbles and suffers in pain. According to Julian, the servant, who represents Adam and humankind, is unaware that the Lord continues to look upon him with grace and kindness despite his failings. Julian published her visions in the 1395 book Revelations of Divine Love.

=== Hildegard of Bingen (1098–1179) ===
The religious career of Hildegard of Bingen began at seven when she went to live with her aunt Jutta, who was a recluse. Their retreat was later turned into a convent, where Hildegard became a nun at fourteen. She wrote letters, visions, prophecies, songs, and morality plays. She was known as a prophet to all her contemporaries, one being Bernard of Clairvaux. Hildegard had visions from the age of five. According to her she experienced two types of spiritual visions: "the Living Light" in which she could see nothing, and "the Shade of the Living Light" where there was a diffused radiance.

In Scivias, published between 1151 and 1152, Hildegard recounted twenty six visions. A description of one her visions in Book 2 of Scivias illustrates the form in which divine revelation manifested to her: "Then I saw a most splendid light, and in the light, the whole of which burnt in a most beautiful, shining fire, was the fire of a man of the sapphire colour, and that most splendid light poured over the whole of that shining fire, and the shining fire over all that splendid light, and that most splendid light and shining fire over the whole figure of the man, appearing one light in one virtue and power. And again I heard that living Light saying to me: This is the meaning of the mysteries of God, that it may be discerned and understood discreetly what that fulness may be, which is without beginning and to which nothing is wanting, who by the most powerful strength plated all the strong places."

=== Marguerite Porete (1250–1310) ===
Marguerite Porete was a French Beguine from Hainault who lived during the late thirteenth and early fourteenth century. She published The Mirror of Simple Souls in the vernacular French and was arrested on charges of heresy in 1310. She refused to give testimony during her inquisition trial in Paris. The University of Paris, after surveying some passages of her book, deemed her a relapsed heretic because she had been accused instances prior to her last arrest. Porete sent her book to three scholars who approved and published the text. The Mirror of Simple Souls was widely circulated and translated into Latin, Italian, and Middle English. Unlike other female mystics, Porete publicly taught the message of her revelations. Similar to Hildegard of Bingen she dispensed with male ecclesiastic representation. However, in the case of Porete she was found guilty by the Inquisition and burned at the stake in 1310.

In The Mirror of Simple Souls, Porete explained the different states of the soul. She explained: "And therefore this Soul knows only him, and loves only him, praises only him, for there is only he. Because what is exists by his goodness, and God loves his goodness whenever he has bestowed it, and his goodness bestowed is God himself, and God cannot depart from his goodness so that it doesn't dwell in him, thus he is what goodness is and goodness is what God is. And therefore Goodness sees itself by means of his goodness through divine light in the sixth state, by which the Soul is purified."

== Notes ==
=== References ===
- Elliott, Dyan (2004). Proving Woman: Female Spirituality and Inquisitional Culture in the Later Middle Ages. Princeton, NJ: Princeton University Press. ISBN 0691118604.
- Finke, Laurie A. (1993). "Mystical Bodies and the Dialogics of Vision". In Wiethaus, Ulrike (ed.). Maps of Flesh and Light: The Religious Experience of Medieval Women Mystics. New York: Syracuse University.
- Fried, Johannes (2015). The Middle Ages. Cambridge: Harvard University Press. ISBN 978-0-674-05562-9.
- Furlong, Monica, ed. (1996). Visions and Longings: Medieval Women Mystics. Boston: Shambhala. ISBN 157062125X.
- McNamara, Jo Ann (1993). "The Rhetoric of Orthodoxy: Clerical Authority and Female Innovation in the Struggle with Heresy". In Wiethaus, Ulrike (ed.). Maps of Flesh and Light: The Religious Experience of Medieval Women Mystics. New York: Syracuse University.
- Patton, Kimberley C.; Hawley, John Stratton, eds. (2005). Holy Tears: Weeping in the Religious Imagination. Princeton, NJ: Princeton University Press. ISBN 0691114439. OCLC 55108966.
- Petroff, Elizabeth Alvilda, ed. (1986). Medieval Women's Visionary Literature. New York: Oxford University Press. ISBN 0195037111.
- Petroff, Elizabeth Alvilda (1994). Body and Soul: Essays on Medieval Women and Mysticism. New York: Oxford University Press. ISBN 0195084543.
- Ross, Ellen (1993). "'She Wept and Cried Right Loud for Sorrow and for Pain': Suffering, the Spiritual Journey, and Women's Experience in Late Medieval Mysticism". In Wiethaus, Ulrike (ed.). Maps of Flesh and Light: The Religious Experience of Medieval Women Mystics. New York: Syracuse University.
