= Angela of Foligno =

Christian saint

Saint Angela of Foligno TOSF
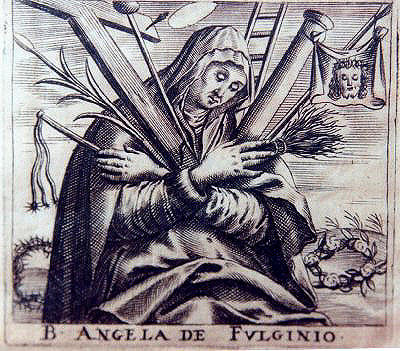
- 18th-century print.
- Born: 1248; Foligno, Holy Roman Empire
- Died: 3 January 1309; Foligno, Papal States
- Venerated in: Roman Catholic Church
- Beatified: 11 July 1701, Saint Peter's Basilica, Papal States by Pope Clement XI
- Canonized: 9 October 2013, (equivalent canonization), Apostolic Palace, Vatican City by Pope Francis
- Feast: 4 January; 7 January (United States)

Angela of Foligno (1248 – 4 January 1309) was an Italian Franciscan tertiary who became known as a mystic from her extensive writings about her mystical revelations. Due to the respect those writings engendered in the Catholic Church she became known as Theologorum Magistra ("Teacher of Theologians"), as first used by Maximilian Sandaeus, later cited by Bollandus in the Acta Sanctorum.

Angela was noted not only for her spiritual writings, but also for founding a religious community which refused to become an enclosed order so that it might continue her vision of caring for those in need.

The Catholic Church declared Angela to be a saint in 2013. Her canonization was an “equivalent canonization” (without executing the ordinary judicial process of canonization).

== Early life and conversion ==
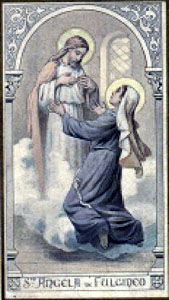
A holy card depicting Saint Angela

Angela's birth date, which is not known with certainty, is often listed as 1248. She was born into a wealthy family at Foligno, in Umbria. Married, perhaps at an early age, she had several children. Angela reports that she loved the world and its pleasures. Around the age of 40, she reportedly had a vision of Francis of Assisi and recognized the emptiness of her life. From that time, she began to lead a life devoted to higher perfection.

Three years later, Angela's mother died, followed, a few months later, by her husband and children. With one serving woman, Masazuola, as her companion, she began to divest herself of her possessions and to live as a penitent. Angela joined the Third Order of St. Francis, probably in 1291. She placed herself under the direction of a Franciscan friar named Arnoldo, who would serve as her confessor.

== Works and later life ==
Angela is said to have received mystical revelations, which she dictated to a scribe in the late 13th century. These accounts are contained in a compilation of two works, usually published under the title Il Libro della Beata Angela da Foligno.

Angela recorded the history of her conversion in her Book of Visions and Instructions. She dictated, in her Umbrian dialect, an account of her spiritual progress, known as the Memoriale, which was transcribed in Latin by a Franciscan friar indicated only as "Bro A." This work was probably begun in 1292. The Memorial is the first part of two sections of Angela of Foligno's Liber. The second text is known as Instructions and is composed of thirty-six instructional texts, a note about her death, and an epilogue. These texts appear in different orders in different manuscripts, and there is not known to be one correct order.

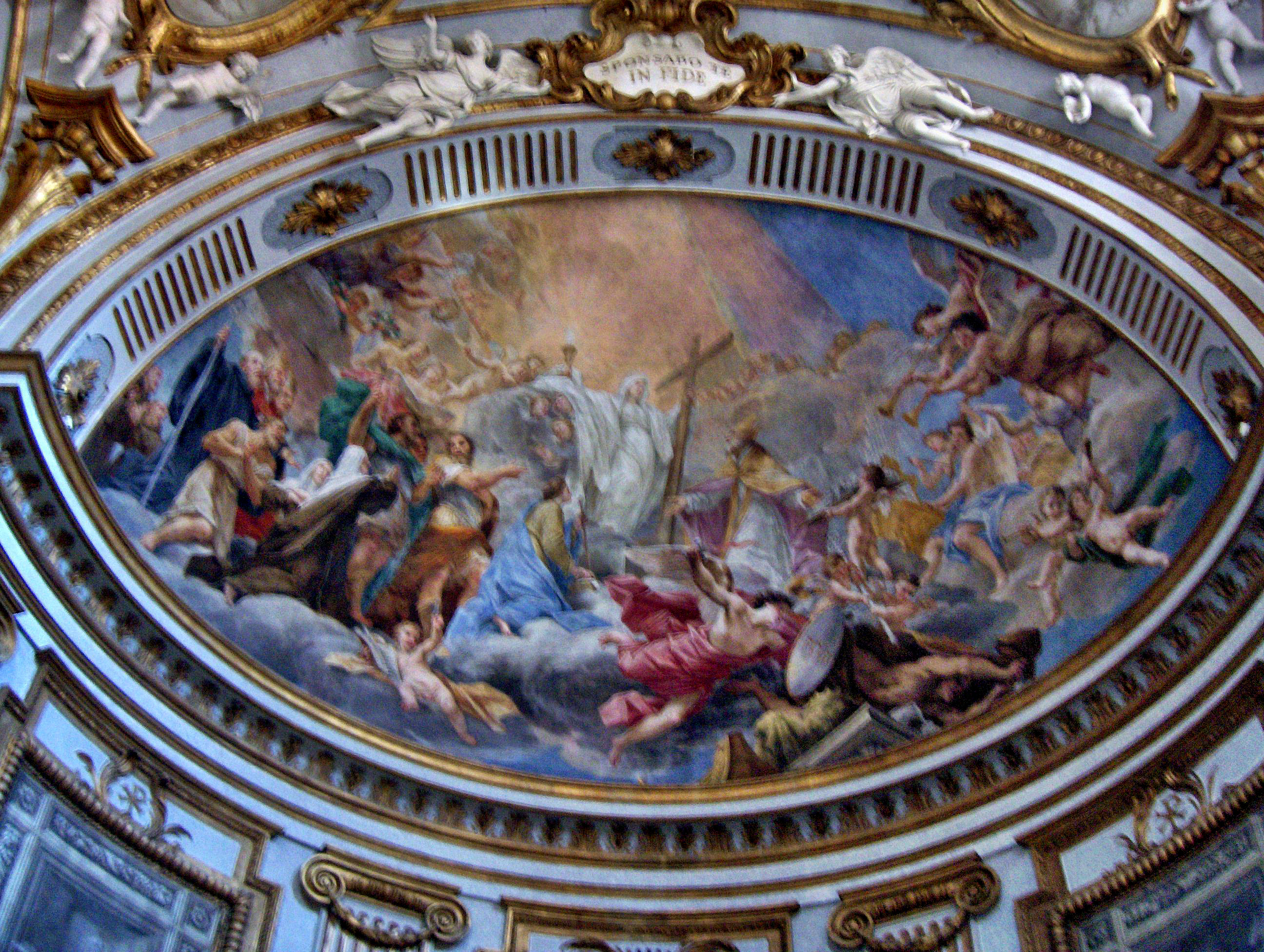
Angela of Foligno, fresco by Francesco Mancini, Dome of Foligno Cathedral

Brother A. remained with her until 1296 while she completed the higher and more difficult final ten stages, but since it proved impossible for him to understand these fully, he condensed them into seven ‘supplementary stages’ whose description takes up the larger portion of the Memorial. The text was finished by 1298, and submitted to Cardinal James of Colonna and eight Friars Minor, who gave it their approval. It seems that Brother A. revised it shortly after, in 1299–1300.

Between around 1296 and her death in early 1309, the fame of Angela's sanctity gathered around her a number of other tertiaries, both men and women, who strove under her direction to advance in holiness. Later she established at Foligno a community of other women tertiaries, who added to the Rule of the Third Order a commitment to a common life without, however, binding themselves to enclosure, so that they might devote their lives to works of charity.

The final version of the Book appends a series of 36 Instructions to the Memorial. These reflect Angela's teaching during this period. These teachings are rather more conventional in tone and have differences in vocabulary and emphasis from the Memorial – which may reflect redaction by several hands. Nevertheless, the Instructions seem to reflect Angela's teaching, albeit at some remove.

No one can be saved without divine light. Divine light causes us to begin and to make progress, and it leads us to the summit of perfection. Therefore if you want to begin and to receive this divine light, pray. If you have begun to make progress, pray. And if you have reached the summit of perfection, and want to be super-illumined so as to remain in that state, pray. If you want faith, pray. If you want hope, pray. If you want charity, pray. If you want poverty, pray. If you want obedience, pray. If you want chastity, pray. If you want humility, pray. If you want meekness, pray. If you want fortitude, pray. If you want any virtue, pray.

At Christmas 1308, Angela told her companions she would die shortly. A few days later, she had a vision of Christ appearing to her and promising to come personally to take her to heaven. She died in her sleep on 3 January 1309.

Angela died surrounded by her community of disciples. Her remains repose in the Church of St. Francis at Foligno. Many people attributed miracles to her intercession.

Angela's authority as a spiritual teacher may be gathered from the fact that Bollandus, among other testimonials, quotes Maximilian van der Sandt, of the Society of Jesus, as calling her the "'Teacher of Theologians', whose whole doctrine has been drawn out of the Book of Life, Jesus Christ, Our Lord".

== Veneration ==
Pope Clement XI approved the veneration paid to her over the centuries in his beatification of her on 11 July 1701 and Pope Francis extended the veneration to all the Church on 9 October 2013, declaring her a saint by equipollent canonization, recognizing the validity of the long-standing veneration of her. Francis also mentions her in his encyclical letter Dilexit nos as one of a number of "holy women" who have "spoken of resting in the heart of the Lord as the source of life and interior peace".

Her feast day is celebrated by the Third Order of Saint Francis, both Secular and Regular, on 4 January (7 January in the United States). Although the community she founded was not recognized as a religious institute until the 20th century, she is honored as a religious.

== Bibliography ==
- McGinn, Bernard (1998). The Flowering of Mysticism. pp. 143–144.
- The Book of Blessed Angela consists of the Memoriale and the subsequent Instructiones:
  - A critical edition is Ludger Thier and Abele Calufetti, eds, Il libro della Beata Angela da Foligno, (Rome: Editiones Collegii S. Bonaventurae, 1985)
  - Angela of Foligno, Complete works, translated, with an introduction by Paul Lachance; preface by Romana Guarnieri, (New York: Paulist Press, 1993)
  - Angela of Foligno, Memorial, translated by John Cirignano, (Woodbridge: D.S. Brewer, 1999)
  - Angela da Foligno, Memoriale, ed. Enrico Menestò, Florence (SISMEL/Edizioni del Galluzzo, 2013). ISBN 978-88-8450-488-3.
  - Angela of Foligno, Libro de la experiencia, translated into the Spanish following the text of the Assisi codex by Pablo García Acosta, Madrid, Eds. Siruela, 2014. ISBN 978-84-15937-08-1.
- Il Libro della beata Angela da Foligno, 1985 . - Le Livre des visions et instructions de la bienheureuse de Foligno / [written in Latin by Arnaud de Foligno], 1991 GDEL . - Brockhaus. 17. Aufl.
