= Sex of Angels =

Sex of Angels may refer to:

- Angels of Sex, a 2012 Spanish film
- O Sexo dos Anjos, a Brazilian telenovela (soap opera) aired from 1989 to 1990
- Sexo dos anjos (the term "sex of angels"), refers to theological debates that took place in Constantinople, including in the moments leading up to its fall to the Ottoman Turks. The expression "to discuss the sex of angels" has come to mean wasting time discussing a completely useless and impossible-to-determine matter when there are more important issues at hand
- The Sex of Angels, a 1968 Italian erotic drama film

== See also ==
- How many angels can dance on the head of a pin? – Idiom describing valueless debate
- Gender of angels
- Sexuality in Christian demonology
