= Romana Guarnieri =

Italian medievalist (1913-2004)

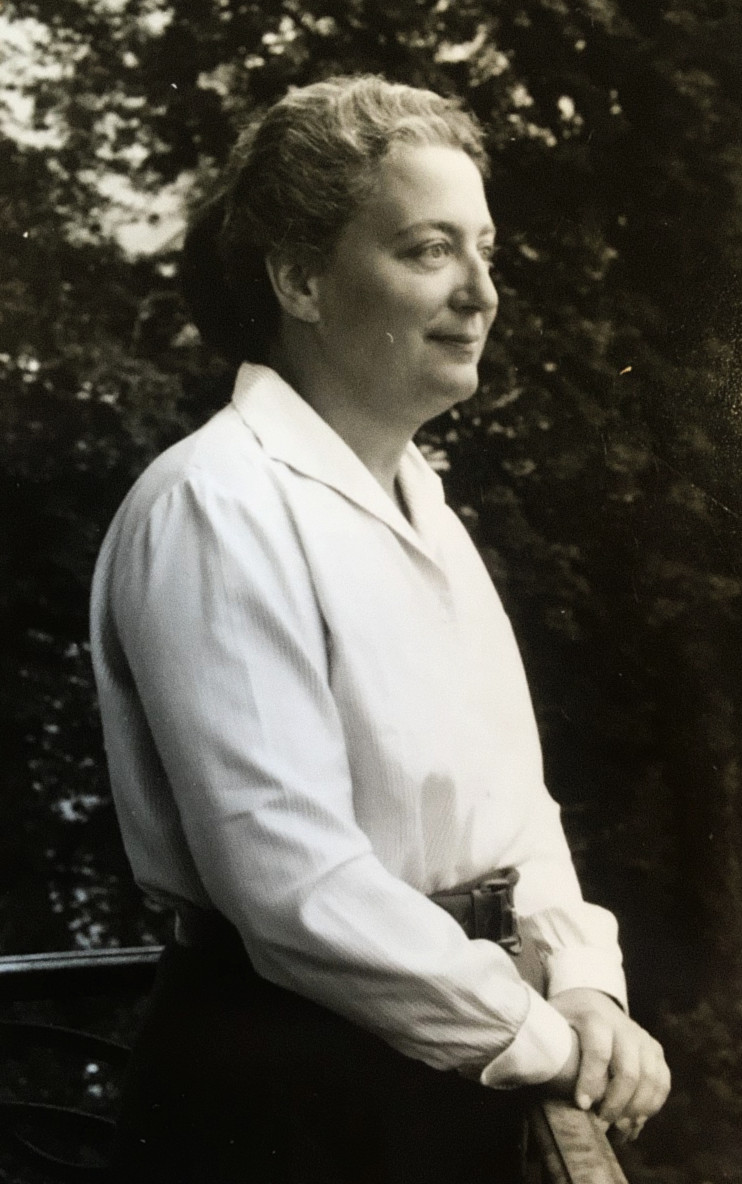
Romana Guarnieri

Romana Guarnieri (1913-2004) was a Dutch-born Italian medievalist, responsible in 1946 for identifying Marguerite Porete as the author of The Mirror of Simple Souls.

== Life ==
Romana Guarnieri was born in The Hague in 1913, the daughter of an Italian father and a Dutch mother. Her parents separated when she was young, and she was for a while brought up by atheist and theosophist grandparents. After her mother's second marriage, to an Italian architect, she came to Italy, living in Rome. In 1939 she gained her PhD in German language and literature. In 1938 she met the Catholic priest Giuseppe De Luca, with whom she collaborated in founding the Edizione di Storia e Letteratura. She also converted to Roman Catholicism.

Guarnieri established Porete's authorship as the author of The Mirror of Simple Souls in an article published in L'Osservatore Romano.

After De Luca's death in 1962, Guarnieri directed the Archive Italiano per la Storia della Pietà, which he had created.

She died on 23 December 2004.

== Works ==
- Guido Gezelle: vita del poeta e saggio delle sue poesie. Brescia: Morcelliana, 1941.
- (tr.) Crocifisso by Cyriel Verschaeve. Brescia: Morcelliana, 1942
- (tr.) Cinque poesie: con testo brabantino by Hadewijch. Brescia: Morcelliana, 1947
- (ed.) Le miroir des âmes simples et anéanties et qui seulement demeurent en vouloir et désir d'amour. Rome: Edizioni di storia eLletteratura, 1961
- Il movimento del Libero Spirito: testi e documenti. Rome: Edizioni di Storia e Letteratura, 1965.
- (ed.) Meditazioni e preghiere by Giuseppe De Luca. Rome: Edizioni di Storia e Letteratura, 1967.
- Don Giuseppe De Luca: tra cronaca e storia. Bologna: Il Mulino, 1972.
- (ed.) Margaretae Porete Speculum simplicium animarum by Marguerite Porete. Turnhout: Brepols, 1986.
- Una singolare amicizia: ricordando don Giuseppe De Luca. Genoa: Marietti, 1998
- Donne e chiesa tra mistica e istituzioni, secoli XIII-XV. Rome: Edizioni di storia e letteratura, 2004.
- (with Giuseppe De Luca, ed. by Vanessa Roghi) Tra le stelle e il profondo : carteggio 1938-1945. Brescia: Morcelliana, 2010.
