= How many angels can dance on the head of a pin? =

Idiom describing valueless debate

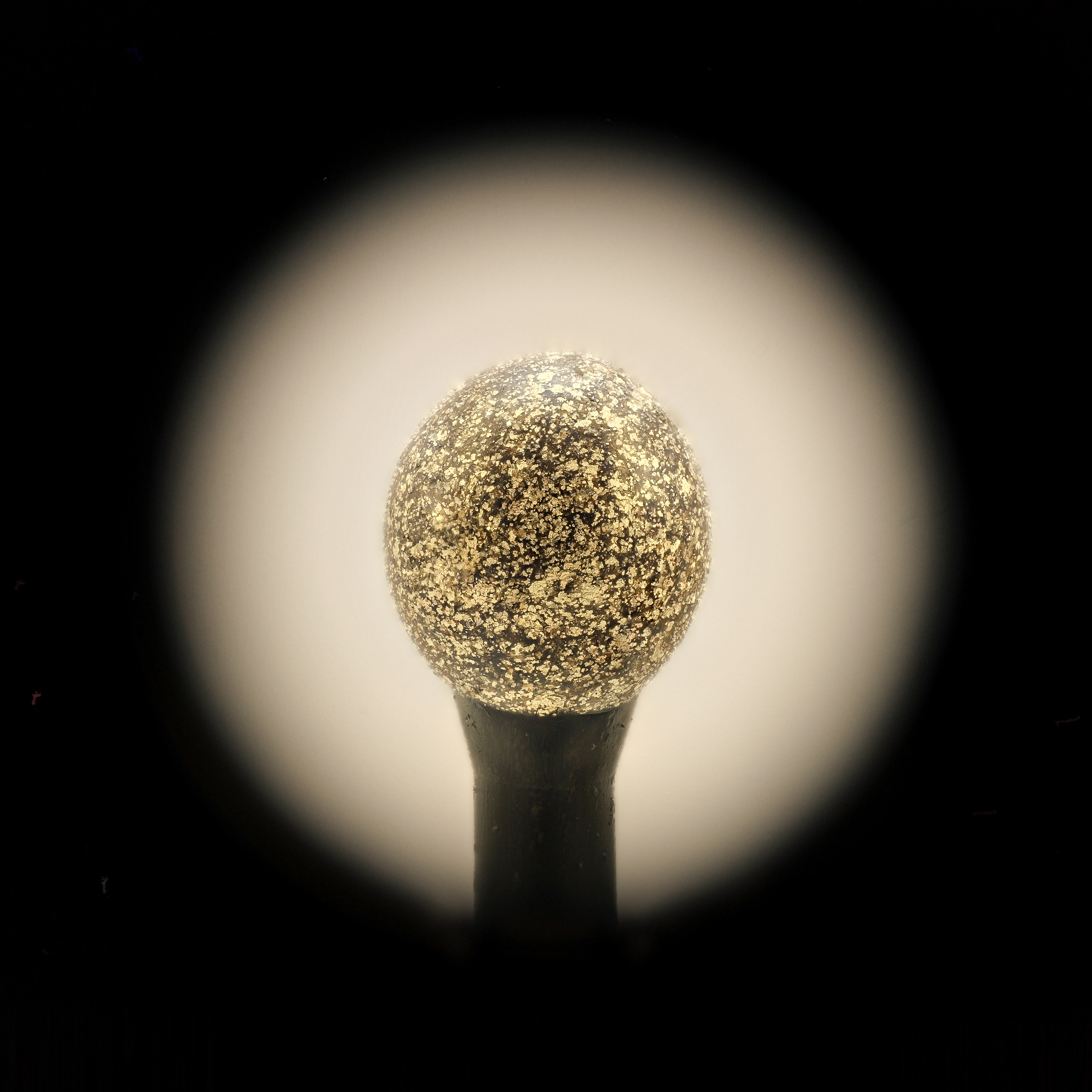
Photograph at 10x magnification of the head of a size #2 insect pin. Taken by Hugo Sappington at the Essig Museum of Entomology, using a Macropod Micro Kit.

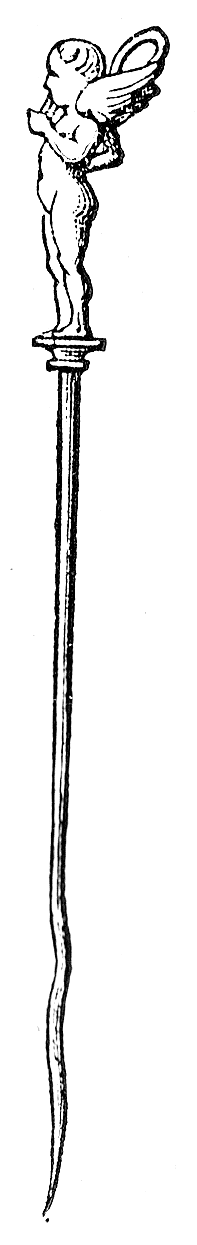
Illustration of a pin with a head shaped like a Cherub, from Illustrerad verldshistoria by E. Wallis, volume I, published 1875

"How many angels can dance on the head of a pin?" is a metaphor for wasting time debating topics of no practical value, or on questions whose answers hold no intellectual consequence when more urgent concerns accumulate. Alternatively, it is phrased as "How many angels can stand on the point of a pin?" It is used this way in modern contexts; the phrase was originally used in a theological context by 17th-century Protestants to mock medieval scholastics such as Duns Scotus and Thomas Aquinas. Whether medieval scholastics really discussed the topic is, however, a matter of debate. The suggestion is possibly an early modern invention that was intended to discredit scholastic philosophy.

The phrase has also been associated with the fall of Constantinople, with the assertion that scholars debated the topic while the Ottoman Empire besieged the city. In Italian, French, Spanish and Portuguese, the conundrum of useless scholarly debates is linked to a similar question of whether or not angels are sexless. In Polish, the question is about devils instead of angels.

== Origin ==
Thomas Aquinas's Summa Theologica, written c. 1270, includes discussion of several questions regarding angels such as "Can several angels be in the same place?" (Note: Thomas answers this question in the negative, but clarifies that angels and physical bodies "are not in a place in the same way.") However, evidence that the question was widely debated in medieval scholarship is lacking. One theory is that it is an early modern fabrication (Note: More precisely in play in the 17th century and discussed at various levels by Cambridge Platonists: Ralph Cudworth, Henry More, and Gottfried Wilhelm Leibniz.) that was used to discredit scholastic philosophy while it still played a significant role in university education.

Though not stating the question verbatim, Erasmus expressed a similar sentiment in his 1509 essay In Praise of Folly, where he accused scholastics of debating whether God

[could have] taken on the form of a woman, a devil, a donkey, a gourd, or a flintstone? If so, how could a gourd have preached sermons, performed miracles, and been nailed to the cross?

James Franklin mentioned a 17th-century reference in William Chillingworth's Religion of Protestants (1637) accusing unnamed scholastics of debating "whether a Million of Angels may not fit upon a Needle's point." That is earlier than a reference in the 1678 The True Intellectual System of the Universe by Ralph Cudworth.

According to Helen S. Lang:

The question of how many angels can dance on the point of a needle, or the head of a pin, is often attributed to 'late medieval writers' [...] In point of fact, the question has never been found in this form [...]

Peter Harrison (2016) has suggested that the first reference to angels dancing on a needle's point occurs in an expository work by an English priest, William Sclater (1575–1626), in his An Exposition with Notes upon the First Epistle to the Thessalonians (1619). Sclater claimed that scholastic philosophers occupied themselves with such pointless questions as whether angels

did occupy a place; and so, whether many might be in one place at one time; and how many might sit on a Needles point; and six hundred such like needlesse points.

Harrison proposed that the reason for an English writer to introduce the "needle’s point" for the first time to a critique of medieval angelology is that it makes for a pun on "needless point".

A letter written to The Times in 1975 identified a close parallel in a 14th-century mystical text, the Swester Katrei. However, the reference is to souls sitting on a needle: tusent selen siczen in dem himelrich uff einer nadel spicz — "in heaven a thousand souls can sit on the point of a needle."

== Modern interpretations ==
Dorothy L. Sayers argued that the question was "simply a debating exercise" and that the answer that was "usually adjudged correct" was stated, "Angels are pure intelligences, not material, but limited, so that they have location in space, but not extension." Sayers compares the question to that of how many people's thoughts can be concentrated upon a particular pin at the same time. She concludes that infinitely many angels can be located on the head of a pin since they do not occupy any space there:

The practical lesson to be drawn from the argument is not to use words like "there" in a loose, unscientific way, without specifying whether you mean "located there" or "occupying space there."

Physicist Richard D. Mattuck identified the many-body problem in quantum physics with the question at hand.

The many-body problem has attracted attention ever since the philosophers of old speculated over the question of how many angels could dance on the head of a pin. In the angel problem, as in all many-body problems, there are two essential ingredients. First of all, there have to be many bodies present - many angels, many electrons, many atoms, many molecules, many people, etc. Secondly, for there to be a problem, these bodies have to interact with each other. To see why this is so, suppose the bodies did not interact. Then each body would act independently of all the others, so that we could simply investigate the behaviour of each body separately. In other words, without interaction, instead of having one many-body problem, we would have many one-body problems. Thus, interactions are essential, and in fact the many-body problem may be defined as the study of the effects of interaction between bodies on the behaviour of a many-body system.

In particular, the answer depends on how many pin-states there can be at a pin and whether angels obey Bose-Einstein statistics (arbitrarily many angels per pin-state), Fermi–Dirac statistics (one angel per pin-state), or statistics where the angels interact nontrivially.

== See also ==
- Argumentation theory
- Balloon debate
- Discourse
- Law of triviality
- Narcissism of small differences
- Pedantry
- Thinking about the immortality of the crab
