= Sister Catherine Treatise =

Work of medieval Christian mysticism

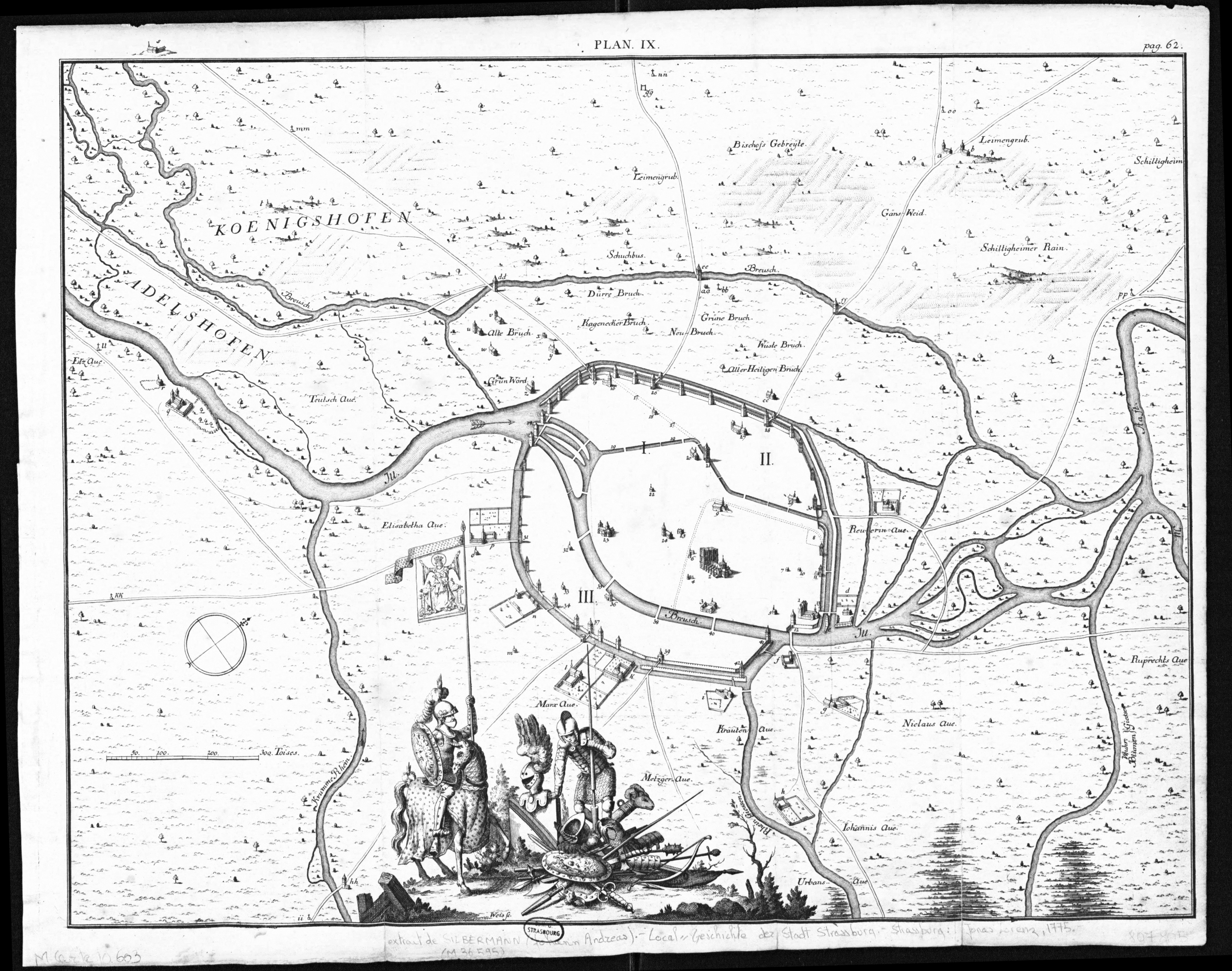
13th-century Strasbourg

The Sister Catherine Treatise (German: Daz ist Swester Katrei Meister Eckehartes Tohter von Straezburc) is a work of medieval Christian mysticism seen as representative of the Brethren of the Free Spirit of the thirteenth and fourteenth centuries in Europe. Wrongly attributed to Christian mystic Meister Eckhart, it nevertheless shows the influence of his ideas (as evinced by the full German title) or at least the ideas which he was accused or attributed as having had by the Inquisition.

== Mystical dialogue ==
The Sister Catherine Treatise takes the form of a series of dialogues in Middle High German between a woman (Sister Catherine) and her confessor (not named but sometimes said to be Eckhart).

Sister Catherine is determined to find "the shortest way" to God and comes to her Confessor for advice. In the first section, her confessor urges her to rebuke sin and seek purity so as to receive God. She leaves with the intention of doing so.

Years later, Sister Catherine returns to speak again to her confessor, but this time, the roles are reversed. Sister Catherine has experienced God and, after falling seemingly dead for three days (in imitation of Jesus Christ), reawakens to claim that she has achieved a unity with God that is eternal and will last throughout this life and beyond. Sister Catherine is presented as having gone further down the road of spiritual development than her confessor, who finds himself praising her for her holiness rather than the other way round.

Sister Catherine speaks of her unity with God in the following terms:

I am where I was before I was created: that place is purely God and God. There are neither angels nor saints, nor choir, nor this nor that. Many people speak of eight heavens and of nine choirs. They are not where I am. You should know that everything stated in such a way and presented to people in images is but an incitement to seek God. Realise that in God is nothing but God. You must also understand that no soul may come unto God before it has become God as it was before it was created. No one may come into the naked Godhead except the one who is naked as he was when he flowed out of God. The masters say that no one may enter here as long as he has any attachment to lower things, even if it is only as much as the tip of a needle can carry. (Sister Catherine Treatise: Trans Elvira Borgstaedt. Paulist Press 1986)

The rest of the treatise consists of a continued dialogue with the confessor, often held at a fever-pitch of excitement and emotion, in which both Sister Catherine and the confessor exchange ideas about God's immanence, the possibility of humanity's union with Him in this life, the role of Mary Magdalene's relationship with Christ as his Lover and chief Apostle and the need to recognise the deceptions of the reality and unreality of Union with God i.e. what true Union is as opposed to false Union. Here the treatise is careful to delineate the danger of those who interpret the Free Spirit ideals as carte blanche to commit sinful and/or immoral acts. The treatise finishes with Sister Catherine abjuring the confessor to strive after higher feats of spiritual understanding, the pupil having become the master (or mistress) and the confessor needing Catherine's guidance to achieve union with God.

== Assessment ==
The Sister Catherine Treatise is often cited, along with Marguerite Porete's The Mirror of Simple Souls, as one of the representative literary expressions of the Brethren of the Free Spirit, which held that a divine union with God was possible to people in this life and, more controversially, independently of the ministrations of the Church. Initially attributed to Meister Eckhart in Franz Pfeiffer's ground-breaking edition of the Christian mystic's works in 1857, it is now regarded as not being by him but showing evidence of his thinking or at least evidence of the Free Spirit movement to which Eckhart was accused of adhering.

Written in a heightened emotional prose which gives the Treatise a slightly hysterical, hallucinatory quality, the work espouses a highly feminine approach to the Christian Mystery, with lengthy discussions of the significance of Mary Magdalene as the true lover of Christ (an element which links it to Porete, some of the alleged beliefs of the Cathars and the speculations of Dan Brown) and the figure of Sister Catherine herself emerging as more initiated into the inner spirituality of Christianity than her male counterpart. In it, many of the articles of faith of the Free Spirit movement are expressed: a neo-Platonic/panentheistic belief in God's immanence in Creation, the possibility of salvation and the Unio Mystica in this life, the limitations of Church teaching in terms of real mystical insight. As such it is a valuable document for those in search of understanding the more radical approach to interpreting the Gospels of the medieval period known as the Brethren of the Free Spirit.

The treatise is the only known medieval work which could contain an allusion to the well-known question of how many angels can stand on the point of a needle: tusent selen siczen in dem himelrich uff einer nadel spicz "in heaven a thousand souls can sit on the point of a needle." However the reference is to souls, not angels, and dancing on the point of a needle or pin appears to be a later concept.

== See also ==
- Brethren of the Free Spirit
- Cathars/Catharism
- Christianity
- Christian mysticism
- Inquisition
- Marguerite Porete
- Mary Magdalene
- Meister Eckhart
