= Marcella Pattyn =

Marcella Pattyn (18 August 1920 in Thysville (Belgian Congo) to 14 April 2013 in Kortrijk), was the last traditional Beguine.

== Life ==
Born in the Belgian Congo in 1920, Marcella Pattyn wanted to join a missionary order from an early age. However, she was rejected by several orders because she was nearly blind. She was accepted into the Béguinage of St Elisabeth at Sint-Amandsberg, Ghent in 1941. She was musically talented and played the organ, banjo and accordion.

She moved to the Béguinage of St Elisabeth at Kortrijk in 1960, where she became one of a community of nine. She was the last to join this community.

On her 91st birthday, as it was already known that she was the last Beguine, the mayor of Kortrijk and former justice minister of Belgium said:

"You are a piece of world heritage. You can not go yet! " – Stefaan De Clerck

She died on 14 April 2013 aged 92 years and was buried in the cemetery of St. John in Kortrijk on 19 April 2013, in the vault of the Beguines.
