= Brethren of the Free Spirit =

Late Medieval European religious movement

The Brethren of the Free Spirit were adherents of a loose set of beliefs deemed heretical by the Catholic Church but held (or at least believed to be held) by some Christians, especially in the Low Countries, Germany, France, Bohemia, and Northern Italy between the thirteenth and fifteenth centuries. The movement was first identified in the late thirteenth century. It was not a single movement or school of thought, and it caused great unease among Church leaders at the time. Adherents were also called Free Spirits.

The set of errors condemned in the decree Ad nostrum at the Council of Vienne (1311–12) has often been used by historians to typify the group's core beliefs, though there was wide variation over how the heresy was defined during the era, and there is substantial debate over how far the individuals and groups accused of holding the beliefs (including Marguerite Porete, the Beguines, the Beghards, and Meister Eckhart) actually held the views attributed to them.

The meaning of the term has in more recent times been extended to apply to the beliefs of other Christian individuals and groups, active both before and after the core period of the late Middle Ages.

== Beliefs and origins ==
The set of beliefs ascribed to the Free Spirits is first to be found in a text titled Compilatio de Novo Spiritu ('Compilation of the New Spirit')—put together by Albert the Great in the 1270s—concerning a group of individuals investigated in the Swabian Ries area of Germany. The themes that occur in these documents, and which would emerge again in subsequent investigations, included:

- Autotheism: In other words, a belief that the perfected soul and God are indistinguishably unified. This was often expressed through the language of indistinction or annihilation. This belief would be heretical because it would undermine the necessary distinction between created beings and the creator.
- Denial of the necessity of the Catholic Church and its sacraments for salvation—such that asceticism and reliance on the Holy Spirit was believed to be sufficient for salvation. They believed that they could communicate directly with God and did not need the Catholic Church for intercession.
- Use of the language of erotic union with Jesus.
- Antinomian statements, such as "nothing is a sin except what is thought to be a sin". Critics of the Free Spirit interpreted its beliefs to mean that adherents considered themselves to be incapable of sin and above the moral conduct of the Catholic Church. New Testament such as Galatians 5:18 ("Those who are driven or led by the Spirit of God are no longer under the law") were seen as foundational to such beliefs.
- Anticlerical sentiment.

During the late thirteenth century, such concerns increasingly became applied to the various unregulated religious groups such as the Beguines and Beghards, who had greatly increased in number in the preceding decades. Concerns over such sentiments then began to occur elsewhere, especially during the 1300s, and especially in Italy. Partly motivated by such concerns, in 1308, Pope Clement V summoned a general council, which met at Vienne from October 1311 to May 1312. In particular, it had to engage with the report from the Paris Inquisition (1308–1310) into the beguine Marguerite Porete's The Mirror of Simple Souls. Porete's writing, which had become well read through France, had been condemned in 1310 as heresy, and Porete had been burned at the stake. It was the Council of Vienne that first associated these various beliefs with the idea of the "Free Spirit".

== 14th and 15th century ==
During subsequent centuries, there was great fear of the Heresy of the Free Spirit, and many individuals and groups were accused of it. In particular, beguine and beghard groups came under suspicion.

John of Dirpheim, Bishop of Strasbourg from 1306 to 1328, was a particularly fervent opponent of heresy. Another person accused, by Bishop John's colleague Henry of Virneburg, Bishop of Cologne, was Meister Eckhart, a German Dominican, who lived during the late thirteenth and early fourteenth centuries. In 1326, Eckhart was charged by the Pope for teaching heresy. He rigorously denied and defended against that charge until he disappeared from public life. Eckhart may have been familiar with the work of Marguerite Porete through his proximity to theologians involved in her trial, such as Berengar of Landora and William of Poitiers. More broadly, as a result of his prominence and through the statements of his used in the bull In agro Dominico he came to be recognised by the later mystical tradition as the "father" of the Free Spirit. This is seen particularly in the writings of Jan van Ruusbroec and his followers.

During the late fourteenth century, western Germany became a particularly important area for pursuing the heresy. An example of one person executed is the wandering preacher Nicholas of Basel, who was executed sometime between 1393 and 1397. Another known case was a man named Löffler, of Bremgarten, who was burned in Bern in 1374, having admitted adherence to the movement. False beliefs about the annihilation of the will were virulently attacked by the late fourteenth century Theologia Deutsch.

In the early fifteenth century, Jean Gerson accused Jan van Ruusbroec of misdescribing the nature of union with God in a way that placed him in the company of the "Free Spirit" heretics.

By the early fifteenth century, the Catholic Church in Germany viewed heresy as a serious threat. It became a leading topic for discussion at the Council of Basel in 1431. Johannes Nider, a Dominican reformer who attended the council, became concerned that beliefs of the Free Spirit heresy, and other heresies, were mixed with elements of witchcraft. In his 1434 work, Formicarius, Nider combined the Free Spirit heresy with witchcraft in his condemnation of false teachings. Formicarius also became a model for Malleus maleficarum, a later work by Heinrich Kramer in 1486. By the late fourteenth and early fifteenth centuries, the Church's efforts to eradicate heresy and witchcraft resulted in heresy trials and the parallel civil authorities conducting witch burnings.

== Similarities to other Christian beliefs ==
Fears over sets of beliefs similar to the Heresy of the Free Spirit have recurred at various points in Christian history. Fears over esotericism and antinomianism, such as were detected in the Heresy of the Free Spirit, may be detected in the early Church's response to Gnosticism. Fears of suspect forms of prayer were particularly apparent in reactions to the fourth and fifth century Messalianism.

What was perhaps novel in the fears of the Heresy of the Free Spirit was the fear of the notion of personal annihilation. This was a new idea to the mystical tradition, but was also seen as the root of many of the other dangers that were perceived in mystics in the late medieval period.

Similarities may also be detected with seventeenth-century quietism and the seventeenth century British Puritan sect known as the Ranters.

== See also ==
- Marguerite Porete
- Meister Eckhart
- The Mirror of Simple Souls
- Ranters
- Sister Catherine Treatise
- Men of Understanding
