= Beguines and Beghards =

Historical Christian lay religious order

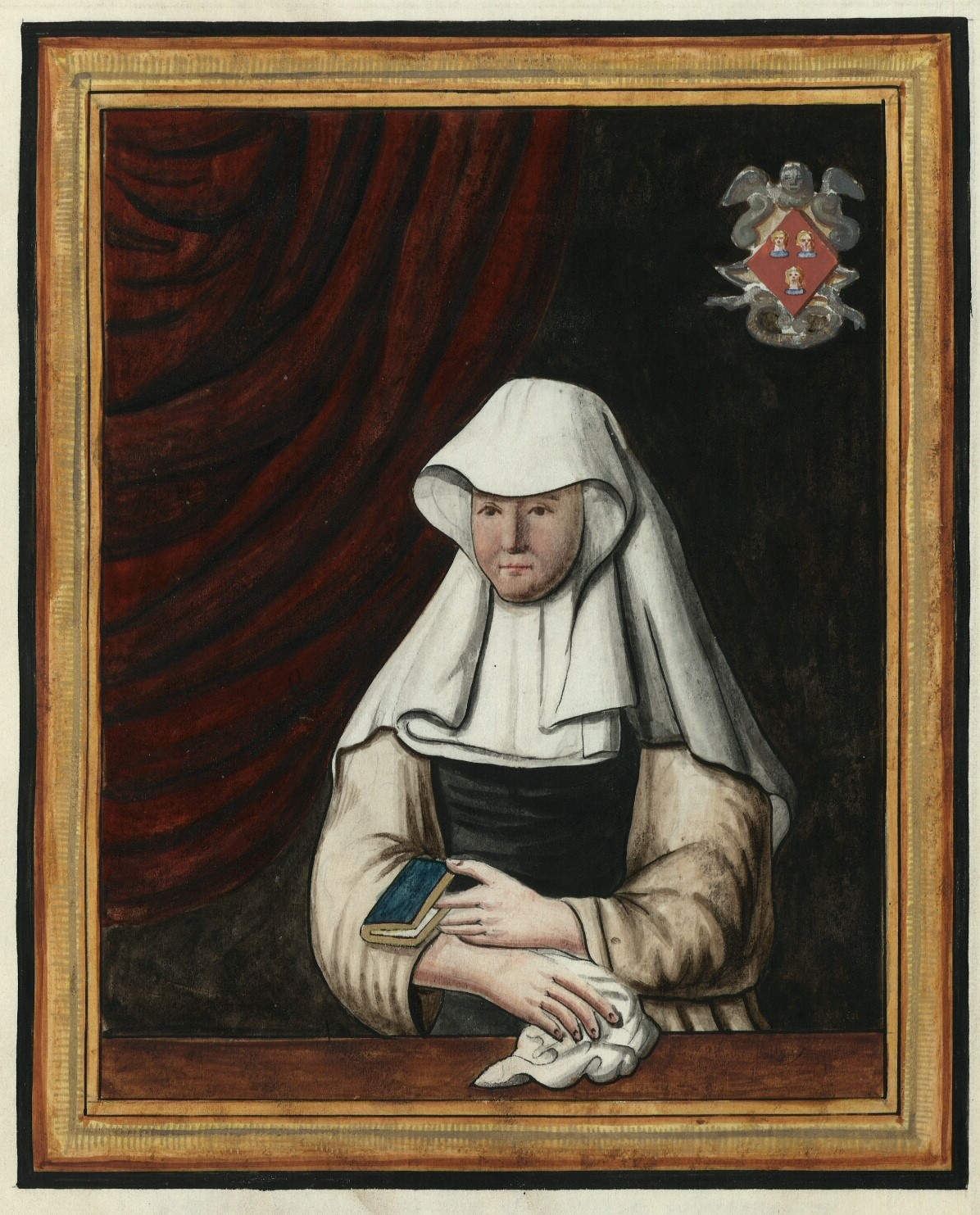
Beguine of Ghent. Excerpt from a manuscript of the beguinage of Sint-Aubertus, Ghent, c. 1840.

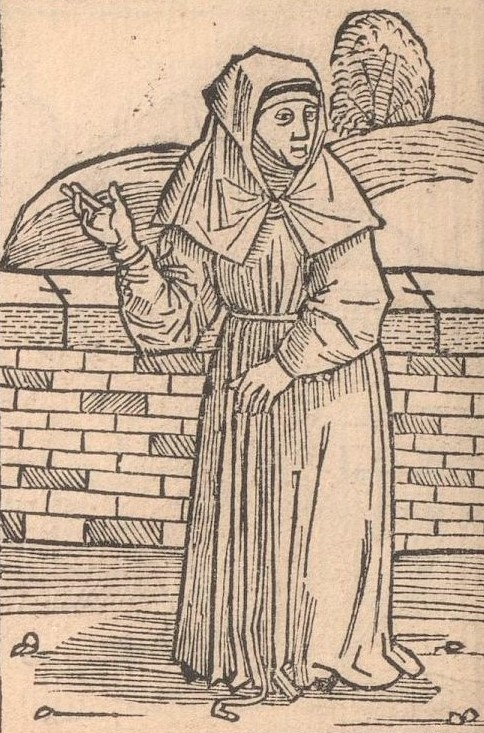
Print of a Beguine in Des dodes dantz of Matthäus Brandis, Lübeck 1489

The Beguines (/beɪˈɡiːnz, ˈbɛɡiːnz/) and the Beghards (/ˈbɛɡərdz, bəˈɡɑːrdz/) were Christian lay religious orders that were active in Western Europe, particularly in the Low Countries, in the 13th–16th centuries. Their members lived in semi-monastic communities but did not take formal religious vows. Although they promised not to marry "as long as they lived as Beguines", to quote an early Rule of Life, they were free to leave at any time. Beguines were part of a larger spiritual revival movement of the 13th century that stressed imitation of Jesus' life through voluntary poverty, care of the poor and sick, and religious devotion.

== Etymology ==
The term "Beguine" (Latin: beguinas; Dutch: begijn) is of uncertain origin and may have been pejorative. Scholars no longer credit the theory expounded in the Encyclopædia Britannica Eleventh Edition (1911) that the name derived from Lambert le Bègue, a priest of Liège. Other theories, such as derivation from the name of St. Begga and from the purported, reconstructed Old Saxon word *beggen, "to beg" or "to pray", have also been discredited. The origin of the movement's name continues to be uncertain, as are the dates for the beginning of the movement itself.

== Beguines (laywomen) ==
=== Communities and status ===
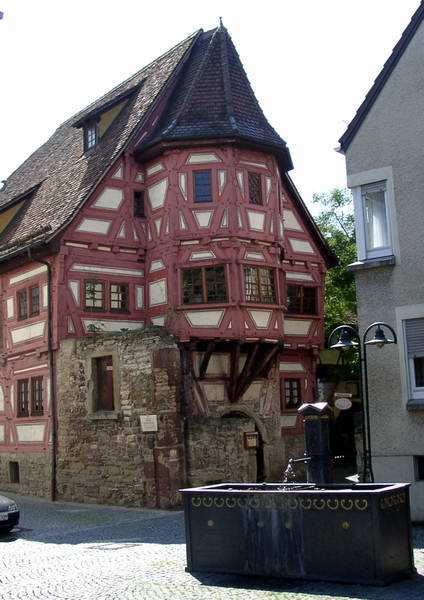
A house in Bad Cannstatt formerly used as a beguinage. It was built in 1463 and restored in 1983.

At the beginning of the 12th century, some women in the Low Countries lived alone and devoted themselves to prayer and good works without taking vows. At first there were only a few, but in the course of the century, their numbers increased. In the Middle Ages there were more women than men due to the structure of urban demographics and marriage patterns in the Low Countries. These women lived in towns, where they attended to the poor. During the 13th century, some of them bought homes that neighbored each other. These small communities of women soon attracted the attention of secular and clerical authorities. Moved or inspired by the women's commitment to prayer, the sacraments, and charitable service in the world, local clergy sought to channel and deploy the women's spiritual fame in response to contemporary problems, especially the institutional church's war on heresy. Several clerics sought to promote these mulieres religiosae (or religious women) as saints after their deaths. Probably the most famous instance of this was the relationship between James of Vitry and Marie d'Oignies, who is sometimes referred to as the prototypical Beguine, in the early 13th century. Marie d'Oignies inspired James. She encouraged and improved his preaching and many of her miracles served to promote the sacramental program of Lateran IV. After Marie's death, James traveled to Rome on behalf of the "religious women" in the Diocese of Liège, seeking papal permission for the women to live in common and incite one another to live good Christian lives.

Beguines were not nuns, but they are sometimes conflated with them. Beguines took personal, informal vows of chastity. Animated by the ideals of the vita apostolica—the same ideals that led to the formation of the mendicant orders—Beguines pursued a life of contemplative prayer and active service in the world. As women, Beguines were forbidden to preach and teach, yet they actively exhorted their fellow Christians to live lives of penance, service, and prayer.

Beguines were never recognized as an official, papally approved religious order. They did not follow an approved rule, they did not live in convents, and they did not give up their personal property. In fact, Beguines were free to abandon their religious vocation at any time since it was not enforced by any binding monastic vow. In many cases, the term "Beguine" referred to a woman who wore humble garb and stood apart as living a religious life above and beyond the practice of ordinary laypeople.

In cities such as Cambrai, Valenciennes, and Liège, local officials established formal communities for these women that became known as beguinages. Beguinages (Begijnhoven in Dutch-speaking areas) tended to be located near or within town centers and were often close to the rivers that provided water for their work in the cloth industry.

While some women joined communities of like-minded lay religious women, adopting the label "Beguine" by virtue of entering a beguinage, many women lived alone or with one or two other like-minded women. Beguines engaged in a range of occupations to support themselves. Women in the Low Countries tended to work in the cities' lucrative wool industry. Parisian Beguines were important contributors to the city's burgeoning silk industry.

Beguines were an influential group when it came to the spread of writing and manuscripts. Because Beguines could read and write in the vernacular, they valorized the use of vernacular writing for religious purposes. They played a crucial role in shaping and transmitting the vernacular and increasing common literacy by translating spiritual and mystical texts in their own local languages. This in turn allowed complex theological ideas to become accessible to a greater and more diverse audience. Not only did they translate existing religious texts, they wrote their own original manuscripts as well. These written works of Beguines were not only accepted but quite popular. Some texts, upon completion, were quickly translated into Latin, representing their broad appeal and authority. One example of this was the work of Mechthild of Magdeburg, entitled, The Flowering Light of the Godhead, which was translated very near the time of its composition. Given the Latin-literate and male-dominated religious elite of the time, the translation of Beguine texts to the authoritative Latin signifies the esteem that was attributed to them. Many Beguines were born from noble families, indicating their familiarity with courtly literature which commonly centered around romantic ideals such as courtly love and chivalry. This understanding is eminent in their writings which often combined biblical themes with more secular, romantic imagery. This style of writing can also be seen as a metaphor for their greater existence which binds religious devotion with secular action. Whereas scribes who were confined to the convent or monastery contributed to the spread of literacy and biblical texts intermediately, by means of their inscriptions, Beguines took this a step further by being the disseminators of their own works. In addition, they contributed to the transmission of vernacular religious and secular texts through their writing, teaching and wider network of religious and secular patrons.

Beguinages were not convents. There was no overarching structure such as a mother-house. Each beguinage adopted its own rule. The Bishop of Liège created a rule for Beguines in his diocese. However, every community was complete in itself and fixed its own order of living. Later, many adopted the rule of the Third Order of Saint Francis.

Beguine communities varied in terms of the social status of their members; some of them only admitted ladies of high degree; others were reserved exclusively for persons in humble circumstances; others still welcomed women of every condition, and these were the most popular. Several, like the great beguinage of Ghent, had thousands of inhabitants. The Beguinage of Paris, founded before 1264, housed as many as 400 women. Douceline of Digne (c. 1215–1274) founded the Beguine movement in Marseille; her hagiography, which was composed by a member of her community, sheds light on the movement in general.

This semi-monastic institution was adapted to its age and spread rapidly throughout the land. Some Beguines became known as "holy women" (mulieres sanctae), and their devotions influenced religious life within the region. Beguine religious life was part of the mysticism of that age. There was a beguinage at Mechelen as early as 1207, at Brussels in 1245, at Leuven before 1232, at Antwerp in 1234, and at Bruges in 1244. By the close of the century, most communes in the Low Countries had a beguinage; several of the great cities had two or more.

Some influential Beguinages were Begijnhof (Amsterdam), Begijnhof (Breda), and Begijnhof (Utrecht).

=== Criticism and social response ===
As the 13th century progressed, some Beguines came under criticism as a result of their ambiguous social and legal status. As a conscious choice to live in the world but in a way that effectively surpassed (at least in piety) or stood out from most laypeople, Beguines attracted disapprobation as much as admiration. In some regions, the term Beguine itself denoted an ostentatiously, even obnoxiously religious woman; an image that quickly led to accusations of hypocrisy (consider the Beguine known as "Constrained Abstinence" in the Roman de la Rose). Some professed religious were offended by the assuming of "religious" status without the commitment to a rule, while the laity resented the implicit disapproval of marriage and other markers of secular life. The women's legal standing in relation to ecclesiastical and lay authorities was unclear. Beguines seemed to enjoy the best of both worlds: holding on to their property and living in the world as laypeople while claiming the privileges and protections of the professed religious.

On the other hand, admirers such as the secular cleric Robert de Sorbon (died 1274) noted that Beguines exhibited far more devotion to God than even the cloistered, since they voluntarily pursued a religious life without vows and walls, surrounded by the world's temptations.

The power of the Beguine label is evident in the "watershed" moments of Beguine history, from its first appearance in the sermons of James of Vitry (the Beguine movement's earliest and perhaps most famous promoter), to its reference in the trial of the doomed mystic Marguerite Porete (who was burned at the stake in Paris on charges of heresy in 1310), to its centrality in the condemnation of lay religious women at the Council of Vienne in 1311–1312.

=== Marguerite Porete ===
Sometime during the early to mid-1290s, Marguerite Porete wrote a mystical book known as The Mirror of Simple Souls. Written in Old French, the book describes the annihilation of the soul, specifically its descent into a state of nothingness—of union with God without distinction. While clearly popular throughout the Middle Ages and beyond (perhaps dozens of copies circulated throughout late-medieval western Europe) the book provoked controversy, likely because of statements such as "A soul annihilated in the love of the creator can, and should, grant to nature all it desires", which was viewed as meaning some kind of immorality towards the Church, its sacraments, or its canons. Porete taught that souls in such a state desired only good and would not be able to sin.

Also at issue was the manner in which Porete disseminated her teachings, which was evocative of actions and behaviors some clerics were finding increasingly problematic among lay religious women in that era. Indeed, Porete was eventually tried by the Dominican inquisitor of France and burned at the stake as a relapsed heretic in 1310. In 1311—the year after Porete's death—ecclesiastical officials made several specific connections between Porete's ideas and deeds and the Beguine status in general at the Council of Vienne. One of the council's decrees, Cum de Quibusdam, claimed that Beguines "dispute and preach about the highest Trinity and the divine essence and introduce opinions contrary to the Catholic faith concerning the articles of the faith and the sacraments of the church".

=== Post-1312 decline ===
After the Council of Vienne in 1312, the Beguines declined. By the 14th century, some communities were absorbed by monastic and mendicant orders. Many, however, survived the aftermath of the Vienne decrees.

Most of these institutions were suppressed during the Reformation of the 16th century or during the stormy years of revolutions and social unrest of the French Revolution. A few béguinages persisted until the early 20th century in parts of Belgium, including those of Bruges, Lier, Mechelen, Leuven and Ghent, which last numbered nearly a thousand members in 1905.

==== Surviving Beguines ====
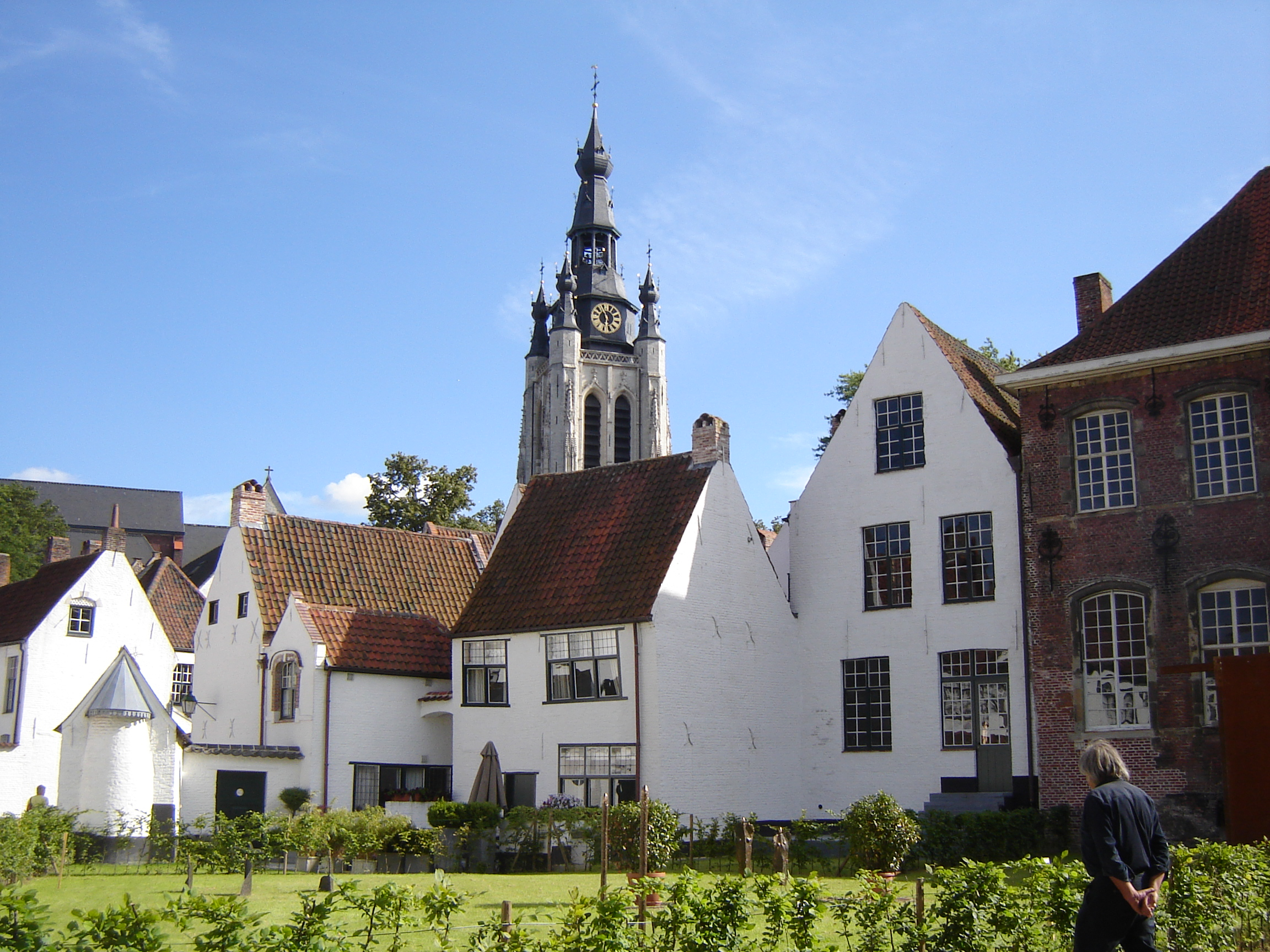
Béguinage of St Elisabeth, Kortrijk

The community of Begijnhof, Amsterdam, credited with having considerably influenced the development of what was the city's southern edge in the late Middle Ages, survived the Protestant Reformation staunchly Catholic. Their parish church was confiscated and given over to exiled English Puritans. The last Amsterdam Beguine died in 1971, but the Begijnhof remains one of the city's best-known landmarks.

Marcella Pattyn, the last traditional Beguine, died on 14 April 2013 in Kortrijk at the age of 92. Born in the Belgian Congo in 1920, she was accepted into the Holy Corner of Elizabeth of Hungary at Sint-Amandsberg, Ghent, in 1941 and moved to the Béguinage of St Elisabeth at Kortrijk in 1960, where she became one of a community of nine.

==== Second and third waves ====
Writer Jean Hughes Raber, a student of medieval women's movements, posited a second wave of the Beguine movement, which occurred in the 17th century, when it was supported by Archbishop Mathias Hovius. His involvement included helping improve the Great Beguines at Mechelen. Raber says there was no clear end to the Second Movement. She suggests that Catholic lay movements, such as those of Dorothy Day in the United States, the Company of St. Ursula and communities of women initiated by Francisca Hernandez, can be seen as extensions of the Beguines into the 20th century.

Raber suggests the Beguines' response to social and economic forces in the 12th century offers a model that can meet current conditions: economic uncertainty or worse, single women comprising a larger section of the population, and loss of wealth in the form of deflated values of housing. She cites a California-based group, the American Beguines, as an example of the revival of the Beguine Movement, with notable but not necessarily problematic differences. In recent decades, a new Beguine movement has arisen in Germany.

Recently, the Beguines of Mercy were founded in Vancouver, British Columbia, Canada. It is a contemplative third order of educated Catholic women whose roots are in spiritual community. Their affiliations are good works, quiet contemplation, and living out their spiritual values.

=== Notable Beguines ===
Among Beguines who have become well-known representatives of the movement in contemporary literature are: Christina von Stommeln, Douceline of Digne, Hadewijch, Marguerite Porete, Marie d'Oignies, and Mechthild of Magdeburg. Modern Beguines include Marcella Pattyn, Marcella Van Hoecke and perhaps Dorothy Day.

== Beghards (laymen) ==
A widespread religious revival inspired several societies for men which were kindred to the Beguines. Of these, the Beghards were the most numerous and the most important.

=== Membership ===
The Beghards were all laymen and, like the Beguines, they were not bound by vows, the rule of life which they observed was not uniform, and the members of each community were subject only to their own local superiors. They held no private property; the brethren of each cloister had a common purse, dwelt together under one roof and ate at the same board. They were for the most part men of humble origin—like weavers, dyers, and fullers—who were closely connected with the city craft-guilds. For example, no man could be admitted to the Beghards' community at Brussels unless he were a member of the Weavers' Company. The Beghards were often men to whom fortune had not been kind—men who had outlived their friends, or whose family ties had been broken by some untoward event and who, by reason of failing health or advancing years, or perhaps on account of some accident, were unable to stand alone. If "the medieval towns of the Netherlands found in the Beguinage a solution of their feminine question", the growth of the Beghard communities provided a place for the worn-out working man.

The men had banded together in the first place to build up the inner man. While working out their own salvation, they remained mindful of their neighbors and, thanks to their connection with the craft-guilds, they influenced the religious life. They are credited with shaping the religious opinion of the cities and towns of the Netherlands for more than 200 years, especially for the peasant.

=== Relation to the Church ===
Religious authorities believed the Beguines had heretical tendencies and sometimes tried to bring disciplinary measures against them. The Synods of Fritzlar (1259), Mainz (1261), and Eichstätt (1282) brought measures against them and they were forbidden as "having no approbation" by the Synod of Béziers (1299). They were condemned by the Council of Vienne (1312), but this sentence was mitigated by Pope John XXII (1321), who permitted the Beguines to resume their mode of life after reform.

The Beghards were more obstinate; during the 14th century, they were repeatedly condemned by the Holy See, the bishops (notably in Germany) and the Inquisition. Ernest Gilliat-Smith, writing in the Catholic Encyclopedia said that men of faith and piety were found among the Beghards. On their behalf, Pope Gregory XI (1374–1377) and Pope Boniface IX (1394) addressed Bulls to the bishops of Germany and the Netherlands. The doctrine of Quietism is believed to resemble the stance of these community members.

=== Modern decline ===
Before the close of the Middle Ages, Beghard communities were in decline. Their numbers diminished with the waning of the textile trade and, when that industry died, gradually dwindled away. The highest number of such medieval foundations in Flanders and Wallonia was 94, but in 1734 they had been reduced to just 34. Pope Gregory XVI referred to them critically in his 1832 encyclical letter Mirari vos. There were 20 remaining foundations in 1856.

== Literary references ==
- Joyce Hollyday's 2020 novel Pillar of Fire offers a fictionalized account of Beguines based in part on the writing of Marguerite Porete.
- In his multi-volume novel The Life and Opinions of Tristram Shandy, Gentleman (1759–1767), Laurence Sterne has his character Corporal Trim describe a Beguine.
- In Charlotte Brontë's 1853 novel Villette, Beguines and a beguinage are mentioned in Chapter 17, "La Terrasse".
- Françoise Mallet-Joris's first novel was Le rempart des Béguines (1952; published in 2006 in a new English translation as The Illusionist). The title is the name of the street where Tamara, a courtesan, lives apart from the bourgeois society of Gers, a fictional Flemish town.
- The 2012 novel Ink & Honey (revised and reissued 2022) by Sibyl Dana Reynolds, tells the fictional story and journey of a group of beguines, the sisters of Belle Coeur, set in medieval France.
- In Umberto Eco's 1980 novel The Name of the Rose (1983 in English), the Beghards are frequently mentioned among the heretical movements which the Inquisition is persecuting.
- Bernard Cornwell in his 2003 novel Heretic has a character, Genevieve, who is a condemned Beguine heretic rescued by the main character, Thomas of Hookton.
- Karen Maitland in her 2009 novel The Owl Killers portrays a group of Beguines in the fictional early 14th-century English village of Ulewic.
- Ken Follett in his 2012 novel World Without End mentions the life of Beguines in the Netherlands.
- Helga Gielen in her 2019 virtual tour in the Grand Beguinage of Leuven explains the difference between Beguines and nuns.
- In chapter 53 of Jean de Meun's 13th-century classic of Old French literature, Roman de la Rose, the Beguines are described by the allegorical antagonist False-Seeming as "to which vermin are no strangers, for in truth from far they're odorous" who wear "foul crumpled hose" and "ugly sandalled shoes".
- Canticle by Janet Rich Edwards, a 2025 novel of a young beguine & mystic, of Brugge/Bruges, based in Flanders, her calling and work.

== See also ==
- Brethren of the Common Life
- Christian anarchism
- Christian mysticism
- Hadewijch
- Heresy of the Free Spirit
- Mechthild of Magdeburg
- Nicholas of Basel
- Sister Catherine Treatise

== General and cited references ==
- Burnham, Louisa A., So Great a Light, So Great a Smoke: The Beguin Heretics of Languedoc, Cornell University Press, 2008.
- De Cant, Geneviève, Majérus Pascal & Verougstraete Christiane, A World of Independent Women: From the 12th Century to the Present Day: The Flemish Beguinages, Riverside: Hervé van Caloen Foundation, 2003.
- Deane, Jennifer Kolpacoff, Beguines' Reconsidered: Historiographical Problems and New Directions, Monastic Matrix, 2008.
- Gilliat-Smith, Ernest (1913). "Beguines". The Catholic Encyclopedia. Vol. II. The Encyclopedia Press, Inc.
- McDonnell, Ernest W., The Beguines and Beghards in Medieval Culture: With Special Emphasis on the Belgian Scene, New York: Octagon Books, 1969 (1954 edition online at HathiTrust).
- Miller, Tanya Stabler, The Beguines of Medieval Paris: Gender, Patronage, and Spiritual Authority, Philadelphia, University of Pennsylvania Press, 2014
- Murk-Jansen, Saskia, Brides in the Desert: The Spirituality of the Beguine, Maryknoll, NY: Orbis Books, 1998
- Neel, Carol, The Origins of the Beguines, Signs, 1989.
- Petroff, Elizabeth Alvilda, Body and Soul: Essays on Medieval Women and Mysticism, Oxford: Oxford University Press, 1994
- Philippen, L. J. M., De Begijnhoven: Oorsprong, Geschiedenis, Inrichting. Antwerp: Ch. and H. Courtin, 1918.
- Reichstein, Frank-Michael, Das Beginenwesen in Deutschland, 2nd edition, Berlin, 2017.
- Simons, Walter, Cities of Ladies: Beguine Communities in the Medieval Low Countries, 1200–1565, Philadelphia: University of Philadelphia Press, 2001.
- Simons, Walter, "Staining the Speech of Things Divine: The Uses of Literacy in Medieval Beguine Communities", Thérèse De Hemptinne & Maria Eugenia Gongora (eds.), The Voice of Silence: Women's Literacy in a Men's Church, Turnhout, Brepols, 2004.
- Swan, Laura, The Wisdom of the Beguines: The Forgotten Story of a Medieval Women's Movement, BlueBridge, 2014.
- Van Aerschot Suzanne & Heirman Michiel, Les béguinages de Flandre. Un patrimoine mondial, Brussels: éditions Racine, 2001.
- Von Der Osten-Sacken, Vera, Jakob von Vitrys Vita Mariae Oigniacensis. Zu Herkunft und Eigenart der ersten Beginen, Göttingen: Vandenhoeck & Ruprecht, 2010 (=VIEG 223).

=== Attribution ===
- Phillips, Walter Alison (1911). "Beguines" . In Chisholm, Hugh (ed.). Encyclopædia Britannica. Vol. 3 (11th ed.). Cambridge University Press. p. 652.
