= Richard Methley =

Richard Methley, also known as Richard Firth or Richard Furth (c.1451–1527/8), was a monk of the Carthusian house of Mount Grace Priory in Yorkshire. He is remembered for his writings - some original, and some translations.

Little is known about his life. He seems to have been born near Leeds (surnames were generally taken from the village of birth, so it is likely he was born in the village of Methley, seven miles south-west of Leeds on the road to Pontefract in Yorkshire), but proof is lacking and his dialect casts doubt on this identification. He entered Mount Grace aged about 25, seemingly spending the rest of his life at that same house, since his writings give no indication that he was ever resident in another house of the Order.

He wrote primarily for his fellow Carthusians, and so his writings are in Latin except for a short Middle English letter. Methley's own surviving writings date mainly from the 1480s. They have all been printed in modern editions.

Methley produced a Latin glossed translation of The Cloud of Unknowing in 1491 for his fellow Carthusian Thurstan Watson. He also then began a Latin glossed translation of the Middle English version of The Mirror of Simple Souls, though he was unaware that the work had been written by the executed heretic Marguerite Porete. Edmund Colledge and James Walsh prepared an edition of these texts in the 1960s, but it was never published.

He died, almost certainly at Mount Grace, at some point in the year before 3 May 1528, when his name was entered among the deaths recorded at the Carthusian general chapter.
