= Sexuality in Christian demonology =

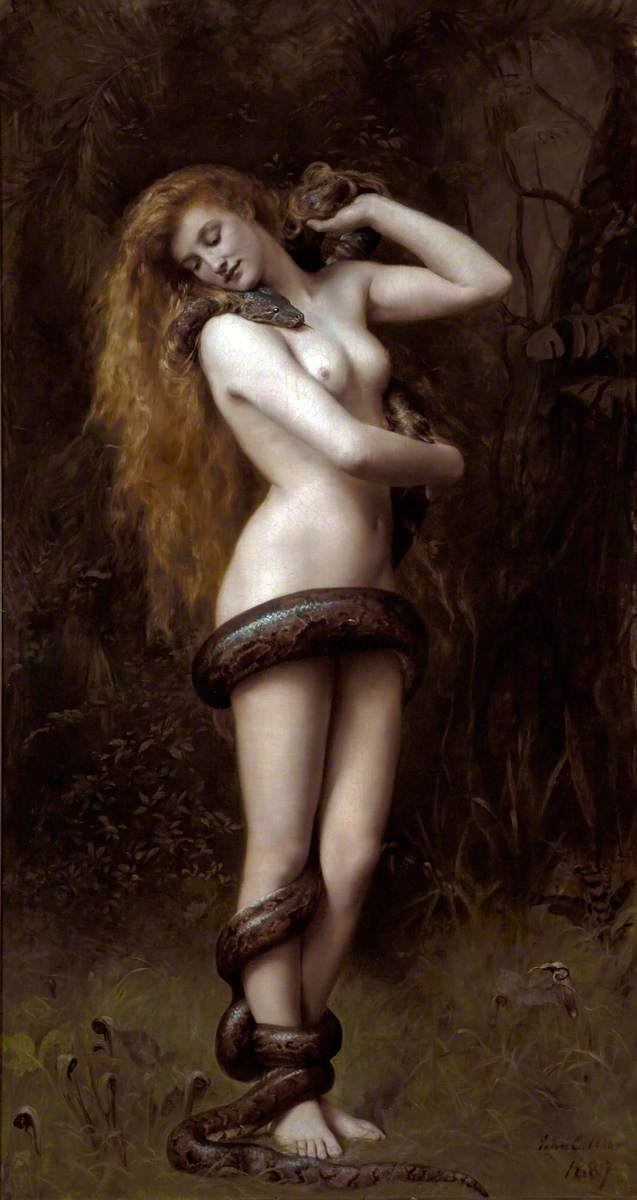
Lilith, 1887 by John Collier

Christian demonology and theology tends to debate over the gender and sexual proclivities of demons. These questions are referenced in Italian, (Note: Discutere sul sesso degli angeli (English: Discussing the sex of angels)) French, (Note: Discuter sur le sexe des anges (English: Talking about the sex of angels)) Spanish and Portuguese phrases that imply that the question is pointless and unanswerable, akin to the English phrase "How many angels can dance on the head of a pin?".

== Gender of demons ==
Traditional demons of Christianity, such as Satan, Beelzebub, and Asmodeus, are almost invariably assigned a male gender in religious and occultist texts. This is true also for succubi, who—despite taking a female shape to copulate with men—are often thought of as male nonetheless.

The Testament of Solomon, an early treatise on demons of Judeo-Christian origin, presents the demon Ornias, who assumes the shape of a woman to copulate with men (though, in other versions, he does it while in the shape of an old man). After meeting him, King Solomon asks Beelzebub if there are female demons, suggesting a difference between male shapeshifting demons (incubi/succubi) and genuine female demons. Similarly, angels in Christianity have also masculine genders, names and functions.

John Milton, in Paradise Lost, specifies that although demons may seem masculine or feminine, spirits "Can either Sex assume, or both; so soft And uncompounded is their Essence pure". Nonetheless, these feminine shapes may be just temporal disguises to deceive people, just as, at one point, Satan takes the shape of a toad. Everywhere else, demons are described as male, and Satan is the father of Death with Sin, a female spirit. In Paradise Lost, Adam explicitly states that all angels of heaven are masculine:

Oh, why did God,
Creator wise, that peopled highest Heaven
With Spirits masculine, create at last
This novelty on earth, this fair defect
Of Nature, and not fill the world at once
With men as Angels, without feminine?

Gregory of Nyssa (4th century), as well as Ludovico Maria Sinistrari (17th century), believed in male and female demons, or at the very least demons having male and female characteristics.

== Lust in demons ==
Lust in demons is a controversial theme for Christian demonology, and scholars disagree on the subject.

=== Early advocates ===
Justin Martyr (2nd century), Origen of Alexandria (3rd century), Tertullian (2nd-3rd century), Augustine of Hippo (5th century), Hincmar (early French theologian, archbishop of Rheims, 9th century), Michael Psellus (11th century), William of Auvergne, Bishop of Paris (13th century), Johannes Tauler (14th century), and Ludovico Maria Sinistrari (17th century), among others, supported the idea that demons were lustful and lascivious beings.

Augustine, Hincmar and Psellos thought that lust was what led demons to have sexual relationships with humans. William of Auvergne conceived the idea that demons felt a particular and morbid attraction to long and beautiful female hair, and thus women had to follow the Christian use of covering it to avoid exciting desire in them. Tauler had the opinion that demons were lascivious and thus they wanted to have sexual intercourse with humans to satisfy their lewdness. Sinistrari supported the idea that demons felt sexual desire, but satisfaction and pleasure were not the only motivation to have sexual relationships with humans, another reason being that of impregnating women.

=== Early opponents ===
Plutarch (1st and 2nd centuries), Thomas Aquinas (13th century), Nicholas Remy (16th century), and Henri Boguet (16th and 17th centuries), among others, disagreed, saying that demons did not know lust or desire and cannot have good feelings like love; as jealousy would be a consequence of love, they could not be jealous. Ambrogio de Vignati agreed with them.

Plutarch wrote that demons could not feel sexual desire because they did not need to procreate; his work inspiring later Remy's opinion. Thomas Aquinas asserted that demons could not experience voluptuousness or desire, and they only wanted to seduce humans with the purpose of inducing them to commit terrible sexual sins. Remy, in reference to Plutarch's Life of Numa in Parallel Lives and Lactantius's The Divine Institutes, stated that "it is absurd to believe that Demons are captivated by human beauty and grace, and have intercourse with mankind for the sake of carnal pleasure... they were created in the beginning of a certain fixed number." Boguet said that demons did not know lust or voluptuousness "because they are immortal and do not need to have descendants, and so they also do not need to have sexual organs", so demons could make people imagine that they were having sexual relationships, but that actually did not occur. Vignati agreed with Boguet saying that sexual relationships with demons were imaginary, a mere hallucination provoked by them, and Johann Meyfarth agreed too.

By supporting the idea that demons could rape women and sexual relationships with them were painful, Nicholas Remy assigned a sadistic tendency to their sexuality.

=== Intermediate views ===
Heinrich Kramer and Jacob Sprenger (15th century), authors of the Malleus Maleficarum, adopted an intermediate position. According to their book, demons did not feel love for witches. This is because sexual relationships with them were a part of the diabolical pact these men and women made with Satan. Demons acting as incubi and succubi with common people were passionate lovers that felt the desire of being with their beloved person and have sexual intercourse with them.

Pierre de Rostegny supported the idea that Satan preferred to have sexual intercourse with married women to add adultery to other sins like lust, but told nothing about his lust or that of other demons.

=== In literature ===
Supporting the idea that demons had feelings of love and hate, and were voluptuous, there are several stories about their jealousy.

The first story of this type is narrated in the deuterocanonical Book of Tobit, in which the demon Asmodeus either fell in love with Sarah or felt sexual desire for her (or both). Out of jealousy, Asmodeus killed seven of her husbands before the marriages could be consummated. Asmodeus never had sexual intercourse with Sarah, and intended to kill Tobias, her eighth husband, but was foiled by the angel Raphael.

Another of these stories about demonic lewdness and passionate love is told in The Life of Saint Bernard, written by Geoffrey of Auxerre c. 1160. He wrote that during the 11th century a demon fell in love with a woman, and when her husband was asleep he visited her, awoke the woman and began to do with her as if he were her husband, committing every type of voluptuous acts during several years, and inflaming her passion.

A story referring to demonic jealousy was told by Erasmus (16th century), who blamed a demon for the fire that destroyed a village in Germany in 1533, saying that a demon loved deeply a young woman, but discovered that she had also sexual relationships with a man. Full of wrath, the demon started the fire.

== Sexual relations ==
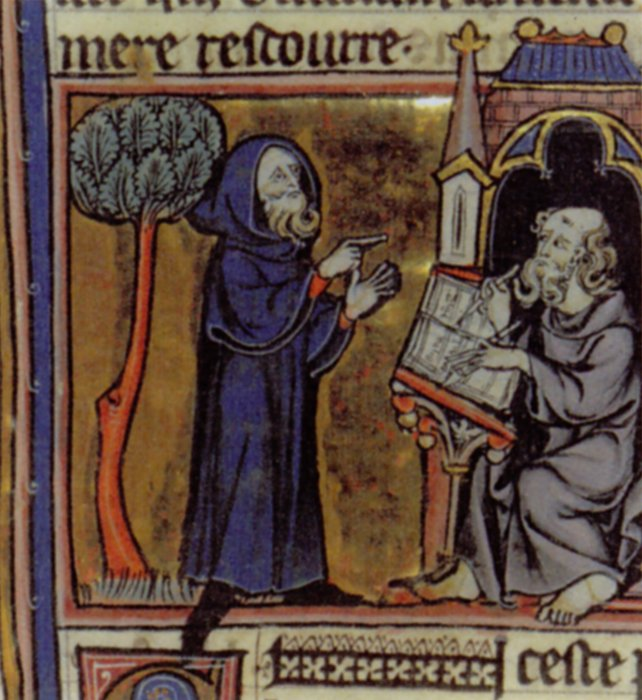
Merlin is said to have been born from the relationship of an incubus with a mortal (illumination from a 13th century French manuscript)

Gregory of Nyssa (c. 335 – c. 395) said that demons had children with women called cambions, which added to the children they had between them, contributed to increase the number of demons. However, the first popular account of such a union and offspring does not occur in Western literature until around 1136, when Geoffrey of Monmouth wrote the story of Merlin in his pseudohistorical account of British history, Historia Regum Britanniae (History of the Kings of Britain), in which he reported that Merlin's father was an incubus.

Anne Lawrence-Mathers writes that at that time "... views on demons and spirits were still relatively flexible. There was still a possibility that the daemons of classical tradition were different from the demons of the Bible." Accounts of sexual relations with demons in literature continues with The Life of Saint Bernard by Geoffrey of Auxerre (c. 1160) and the Life and Miracles of St. William of Norwich by Thomas of Monmouth (c. 1173). The theme of sexual relations with demons became a matter of increasing interest for late 12th-century writers.

It was only beginning in the 1150s that the Church turned its attention to defining the possible roles of spirits and demons, especially with respect to their sexuality and in connection with the various forms of magic which were then believed to exist. Christian demonologists eventually came to agree that sexual relationships between demons and humans happen, but they disagreed on why and how. A common point of view is that demons induce men and women to the sin of lust, and adultery is often considered as an associated sin.

In 1546, the Malleus Maleficarum established that sexual relationships between demons and humans were an essential belief for Christians. But its authors considered also the possibility that demons provoked a false pregnancy in some women, filling their belly with air due to certain herbs they made them drink in beverages during the Sabbaths; at the time of giving birth to the child, a big quantity of air escaped from the woman's vagina. The false pregnancy was later explained by medicine.

== See also ==
- How many angels can dance on the head of a pin?, an expression whose equivalent in several Romance languages refers to debating whether angels are sexless or have a sex.
