= Marguerite Porete =

French mystic and poet (died 1310)

- Born: 1258; County of Hainaut, Holy Roman Empire
- Died: 1 June 1310; Place de Grève, Paris, Kingdom of France
- Cause of death: Burned at the stake

Philosophical work
- Era: Medieval philosophy
- Region: Western philosophy
- School: Christian mysticism
- Main interests: Agape
- Notable works: The Mirror of Simple Souls

Marguerite Porete (French: [maʁɡ(ə)ʁit pɔʁɛt]; 1258 – 1 June 1310) was a Beguine, a French-speaking mystic and the author of The Mirror of Simple Souls, a work of Christian mysticism dealing with the workings of agape (divine love). She was burnt at the stake for heresy in Paris in 1310 after a lengthy trial for refusing to remove her book from circulation or to recant her views.

Today, Porete's work has been of interest to a diverse number of scholars. Those interested in medieval mysticism, more specifically Beguine mystical writing, cite The Mirror of Simple Souls in their studies. The book is also seen as a primary text regarding the medieval Brethren of the Free Spirit. Study of Eckhart (c. 1260 – c. 1328) has shown a similarity between his and Porete's ideas about union with God. (Note: Eckhart's favorite description of the spiritual life as living "without a why" is utilized by Porete consistently. For example, in Porete ch. 81, 86, 89, 91, 93, 100, 111, 134, 135.) Porete has also been of interest to those studying medieval women's writing.

== Life ==
Porete's life is recorded only in the accounts of her Inquisition trial for heresy at which she was condemned to be burnt at the stake. (Note: These accounts were first edited in Frédéricq 1889, v. 1. A more complete edition, though, can be found in Verdeyen 1986.) The information about Porete is probably biased and certainly incomplete. She was said to have come from the County of Hainaut, a French-speaking principality in the Holy Roman Empire, but that is uncertain. Her high level of education means that she likely had upper-class origins. She was associated with the Beguine movement and therefore could travel fairly freely. (Note: In Chapter 122 of the Mirror, she includes beguines among those who criticized her, but she was likely referring to the cloistered Beguines, who felt uncomfortable with the wandering and mendicant Beguine lifestyle that she appears to have practiced. (See McGinn 1998, p. 244))

=== Trial and death ===
Porete appears to have written the first version of her book in the 1290s. Sometime between 1296 and 1306, it was deemed heretical, and Gui de Collemedio, Bishop of Cambrai, condemned it to be publicly burned in her presence at Valenciennes. One of the taboos that Porete had broken was writing the book in Old French, rather than in Latin, and she was ordered not to circulate her ideas or the book again though she continued to do so.

It has recently been suggested that she was arrested in Châlons-en-Champagne in 1308 after the local bishop was told of Porete’ s heretical book. According to the list of êveques (bishops) at Châlons en Champagne's Cathédrale Saint Etienne, Jean Ier de Chateauvillain was the local bishop from 1285-1313. She was then handed to the Inquisitor of France, the Dominican William of Paris, also known as William of Humbert, on the grounds of heresy despite her assertion in the book that she had consulted three church authorities about her writings, including the highly respected Master of Theology Godfrey of Fontaines and had gained their approval.

Porete had been arrested with a Beghard, Guiard de Cressonessart, who was also tried for heresy. Guiard declared himself Porete's defender. Their trial began after they were held in prison in Paris for a year and a half.

During her imprisonment and trial, Porete refused to speak to any inquisitor. In 1310, a commission of twenty-one theologians investigated a series of fifteen propositions drawn from the book (only three of which are securely identifiable today) and judged them to be heretical. (Note: Medieval manuals on discretio spirituum, the clerical judgement of mystical visions, called for the clergy to serve in an advisory role but cautioned them about their ultimate inability to make a definitive judgement on such matters. See late medieval manuals such as Jean Gerson's De probatione spirituum and De distinctione verarum visionum a falsis, available in the Boland 1959 and McGuire 1998 translations. Such manuals tell the clergy to provide learned guidance, not ultimate judgement and warn them that they might make a mistake and end up opposing the Divine will.) Among those who condemned the book was the ecclesiastical textual scholar Nicholas of Lyra.

Guiard, under tremendous pressure, eventually confessed and was found guilty. Porete, on the other hand, refused to recant her ideas, withdraw her book, or cooperate with the authorities, and take the oath that the Inquisitor required to proceed with the trial. Guiard was imprisoned because he had confessed, but Porete's refusal to confess led the tribunal to pronounce her guilty and sentence her to be burnt at the stake as a relapsed heretic. Three bishops passed final judgment upon her. Porete was burnt alive on 1 June 1310 in Paris at the Place de Grève.

The Inquisitor spoke of her as a pseudo-mulier "fake woman" and described the Mirror as "filled with errors and heresies". A record of the trial was appended to the chronicle begun by Guillaume de Nangis. Despite the negative view taken towards Marguerite by Nangis, the chronicle reports that the crowd was moved to tears by the calmness with which she faced her death.

After her death, extracts from the book were cited in the decree Ad Nostrum, which was issued by the Council of Vienne in 1311 to condemn the Brethren of the Free Spirit as heretical.

== The Mirror of Simple Souls ==
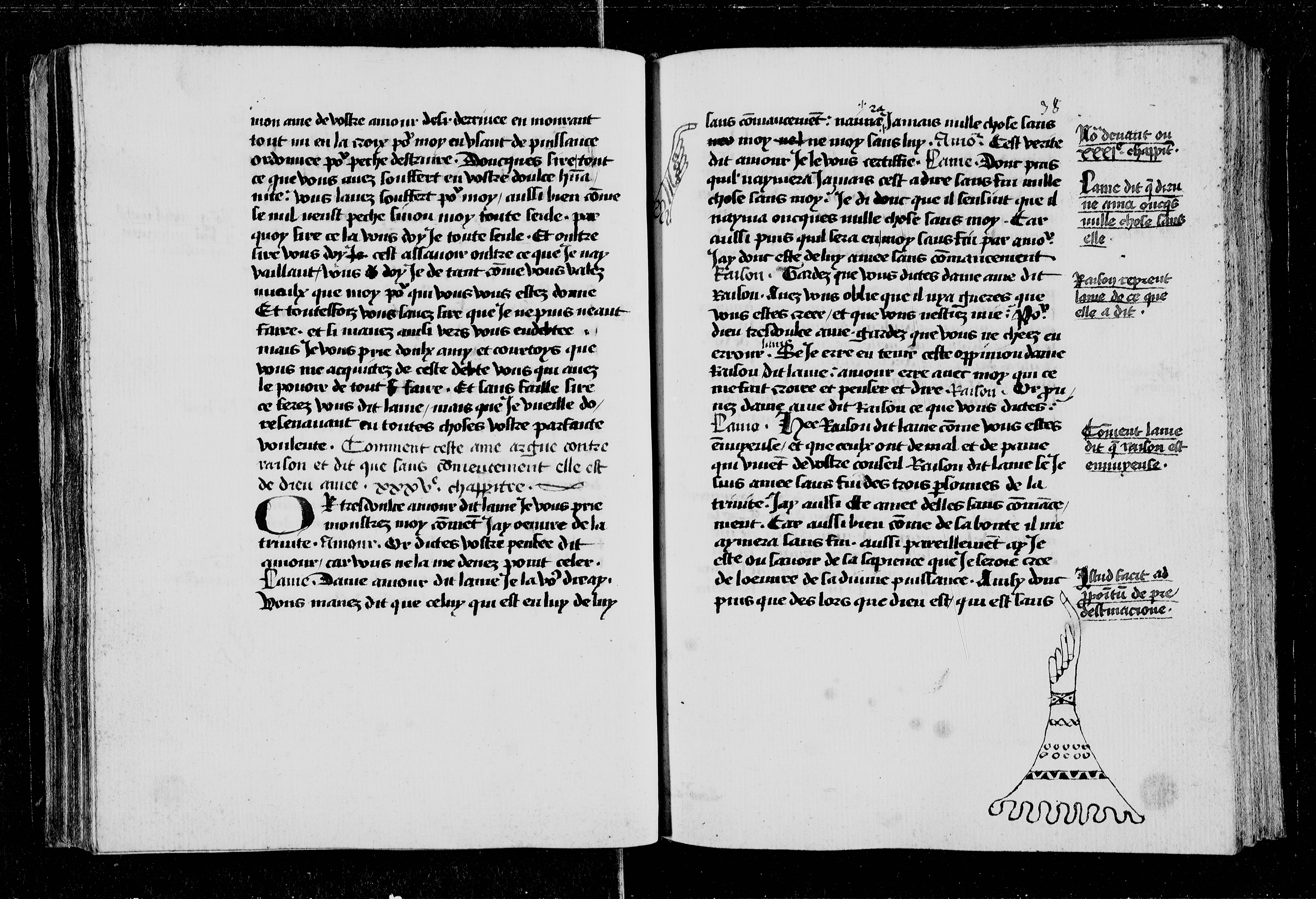
Late 15th or early 16th century French manuscript of The Mirror of Simple Souls.

The title of Porete's book refers to the simple soul united with God, who gives only will. Some of the language, as well as the format of a dialogue between characters such as Love, Virtue and the Soul, reflects a familiarity with the style of courtly love, which was popular at the time, and attests to Porete's high level of education and sophistication.

Much of the book resembles a rational Boethian-style argument between several parties. It is written similarly to the medieval French poem Roman de la Rose. Porete says that the Soul must give up Reason, whose logical, conventional grasp of reality cannot fully comprehend God and the presence of Divine Love. The "Annihilated Soul" has given up everything except God through Love. According to Porete, when the Soul is truly filled with God's love, it is united with God and thus in a state of union, which causes it to transcend the contradictions of this world.

In such a beatific state, it cannot sin because it is wholly united with God's Will of God and thus incapable of acting in such a way, a phenomenon that standard theology describes as the effect of divine grace, which suppresses a person's sinful nature. One of the main targets of her book is to teach readers or listeners how to get to the simple state through devices like images. It is in that vision of Man being united with God through Love, thus returning to its source, and the presence of God in everything that she connects in thought with the ideas of Meister Eckhart. Porete and Eckhart had acquaintances in common, and there is much speculation as to whether they ever met or had access to each other's work.

Porete references the words of John the Evangelist in her own writing:

I am God, says Love, for Love is God and God is Love, and this Soul is God by the condition of Love. I am God by divine nature and this Soul is God by righteousness of Love. (Note: William of St-Thierry, The Golden Epistle 2.263. This phrase describes the transformative power of divine love. Thus this precious beloved of mine is taught and guided by me, without herself, for she is transformed into me, and such a perfect one, says Love, takes my nourishment. (Chapter 21: Love answers the argument of Reason for the sake of this book which says that such Souls take leaves of the Virtues))

Porete's vision of the Soul in ecstatic union with God, moving in a state of perpetual joy and peace, is a repetition of the Catholic doctrine of the beatific vision, albeit experienced in this life, not the next. Porete ran into trouble with some authorities in her description of the Soul in this state being above the worldly dialectic of conventional morality and the teachings and control of the earthly church. Porete argues that the Soul in such a sublime state is above the demands of ordinary Virtue, not because virtue is unnecessary, but because in its union with God, virtue becomes automatic. As God can do no evil and cannot sin, the exalted and annihilated Soul, in perfect union with Him, is no longer capable of evil or sin. The church authorities viewed the concept that someone was above the demands of ordinary Virtue as amoral.

== Legacy ==
After Porete's death, however, the Mirror was circulated as an anonymous work. Originally written in Old French, it was translated into Latin, Italian, and Middle English and circulated widely. (Note: The text survives in six versions in four languages with 13 manuscripts, making it among the more widely disseminated of the vernacular mystical texts of the Middle Ages.) In spite of its reputation as a heretical work, it remained popular in medieval times. At one point, it was thought that John of Ruusbroec had written it.

Only in 1946 was the authorship of the Mirror recognised again, when Romana Guarnieri identified Latin manuscripts of the Mirror in the Vatican as Porete's supposedly-lost book. The Middle French manuscript of the text, probably made after 1370, was published for the first time in 1965.

== Assessment ==
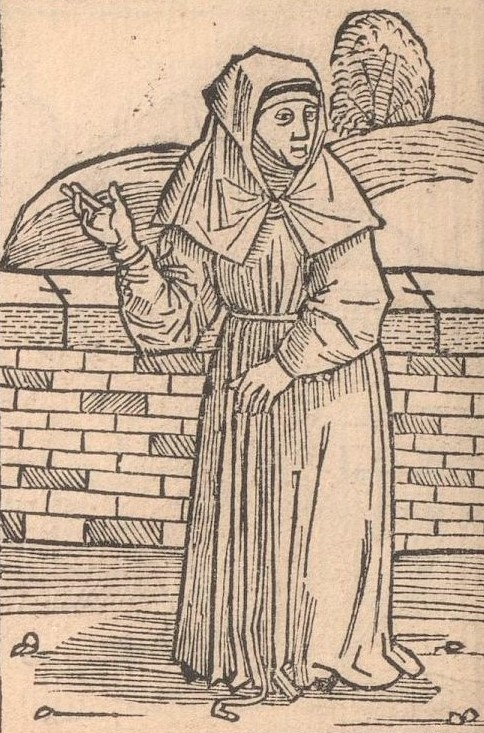
A beguine represented in an incunable, printed in Lübeck in 1489.

There has been some speculation as to why Porete was considered controversial. Growing hostility to the Beguine movement among Franciscans and Dominicans, the political machinations of Philip IV of France, who was also busy suppressing the Knights Templar, and ecclesiastical fear at the spread of the anti-hierarchical Free Spirit movement have all been suggested.

Some also associated her with the Brethren of the Free Spirit, a group that was considered heretical for its antinomian views. The connection between Porete and the movement is somewhat tenuous, though, as further scholarship has determined that it was less closely related than some church authorities believed.

Porete's status as a medieval mystic has grown in recent decades and placed her alongside Mechthild of Magdeburg and Hadewijch in expressing the Love Mysticism of Beguine spirituality.

In 2006, the poet Anne Carson wrote a poetic libretto entitled Decreation, the second part of which takes as its subject Porete and her work, The Mirror of Simple Souls as part of an exploration of how women (Sappho, Simone Weil and Porete) "tell God",

== See also ==
- Hildegard of Bingen
- Julian of Norwich
- Margery Kempe
- Mary Dyer
- Sister Catherine Treatise
