= Maximilian van der Sandt =

Maximilian van der Sandt, S.J. (17 April 1578 – 21 June 1656), known as Sandaus or Sandaeus, was a noted Dutch Jesuit theologian.

Van der Sandt was born in Amsterdam, then part of the Spanish Netherlands. He entered the novitiate of the Society of Jesus, 21 November 1597; he taught philosophy at Würzburg and Sacred Scripture at Mainz. He became rector of the episcopal seminary at Würzburg.

He wrote many works on philosophy and theology, among others a notable controversial reply to the Batavian Calvinist Lawrence in defence of the moral teaching of the Jesuits, entitled Castigatio conscientiae Jesuiticae cauteriata. . .a Jacobo Laurentio, Würzburg, 1617. It was said of him that he left a book for every one of the seventy-eight years of his life, several devotional treatises on the Blessed Virgin, and many ascetical and mystical treatises. He died at Cologne, then a free city in the Holy Roman Empire.
