= Insect pins =

Insect mounting tool

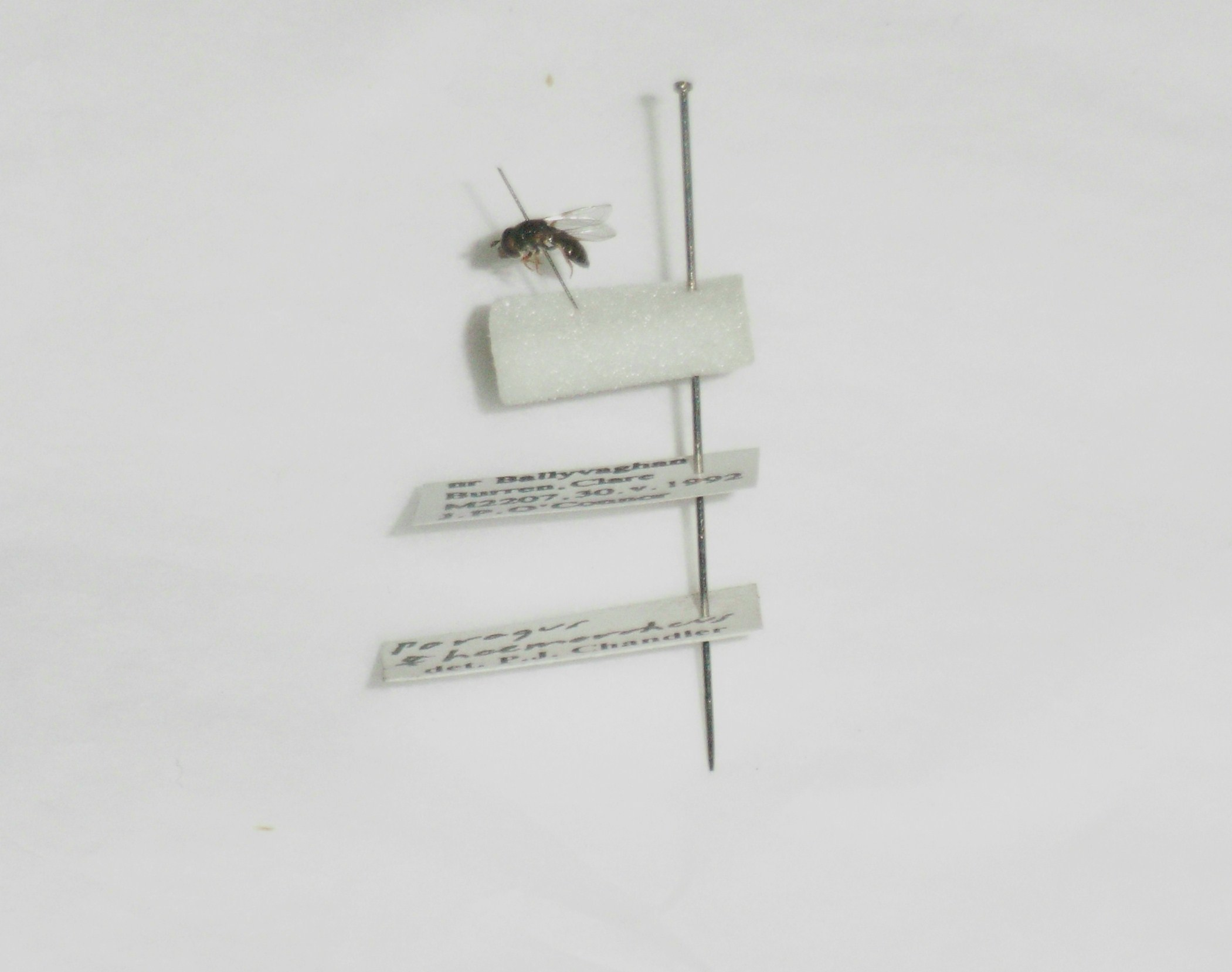
A species of hoverfly double-mounted with a minuten pin and a size 3 pin

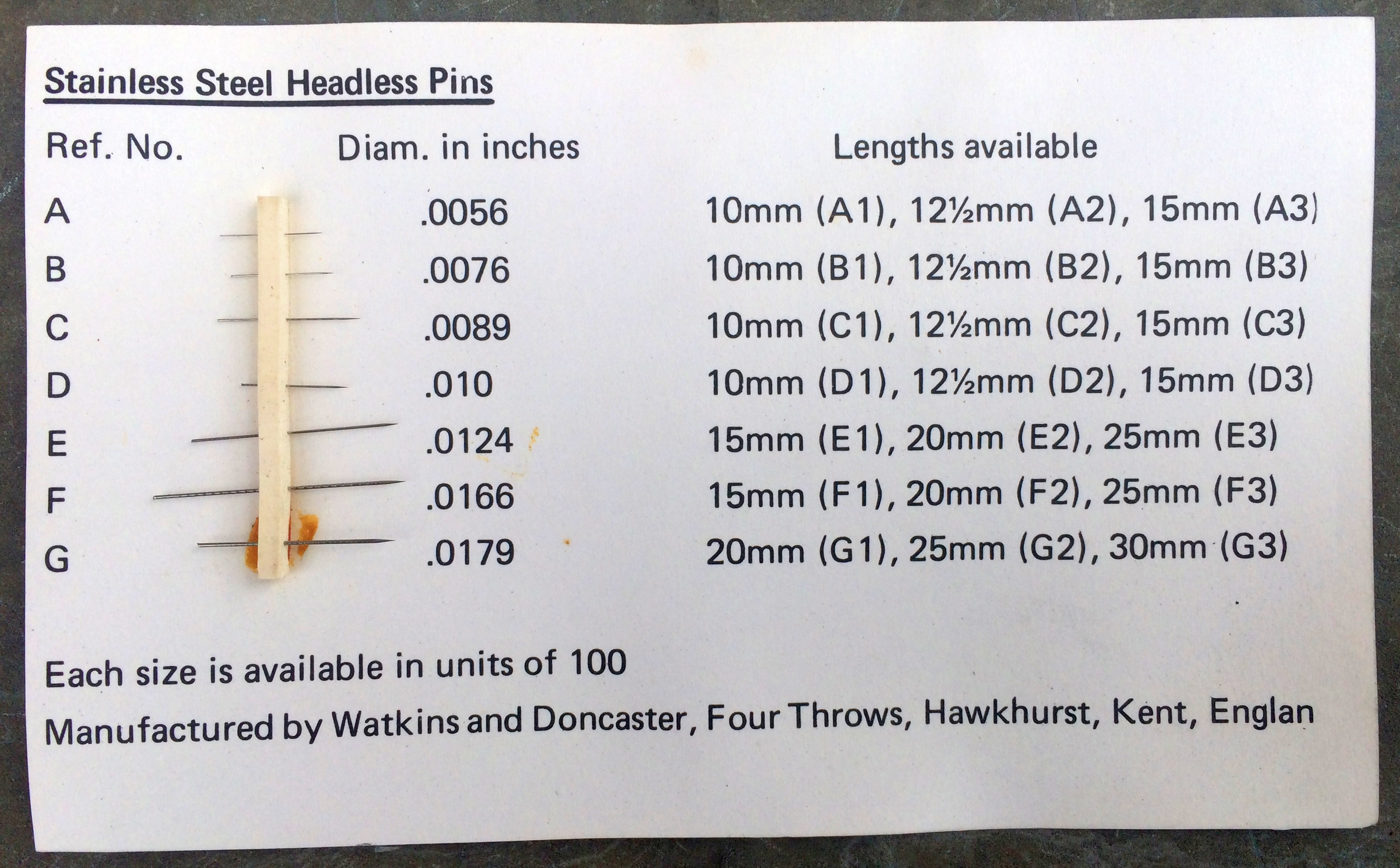
Insect pins on sample card from entomological supplier.

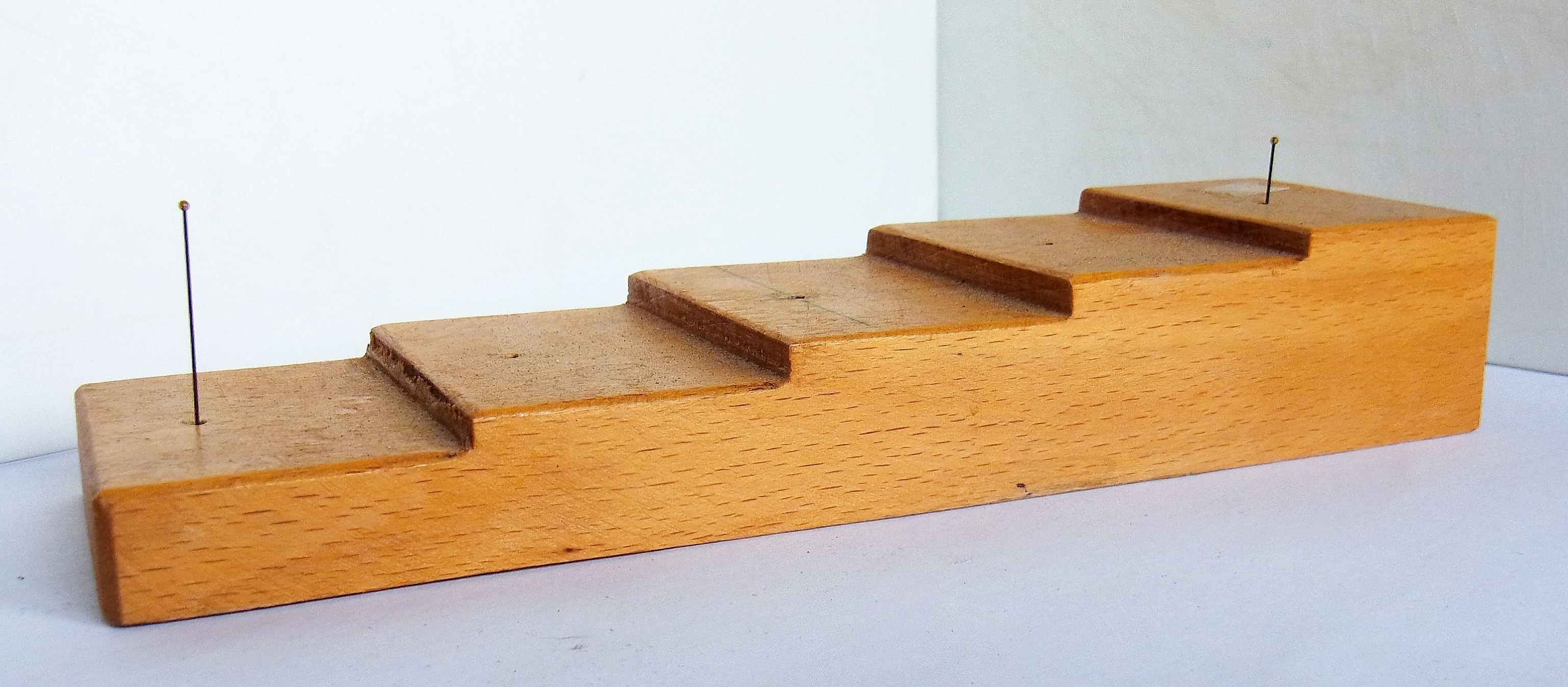
Pinning block, used to set specimens and labels at uniform heights.

Insect pins are used by entomologists for mounting collected insects. They can also be used in dressmaking for very fine silk or antique fabrics.

As standard, they are 38 millimetres (1.5 in) long and come in sizes from 000 (the smallest diameter), through 00, 0, and 1, to 8 (the largest diameter). The most generally useful size in entomology is size 2, which is 0.46 millimetres (0.018 in) in diameter, with sizes 1 and 3 being the next most useful.

They were once commonly made from brass or "German silver", but these would corrode from contact with insect bodies and are no longer commonly used. Instead they are nickel-plated brass, yielding "white" or "black" enameling, or even made from stainless steel. Similarly, the smallest sizes from 000 to 1 used to be impractical for mounting until plastic and polyethylene became commonly used for pinning bases.

There are also micro-pins, which are 10–15 millimetres (0.39–0.59 in) long. minutens are headless micropins that are generally only made of stainless steel, and used for double-mounting. The insect is mounted on the minutum, which is pinned to a small block of soft material, which is in turn mounted on a standard, larger, insect pin.
