= The Mirror of Simple Souls =

Christian mysticism

The Mirror of the Simple Souls
- Cover of the 1993 Babinsky translation
- Author: Marguerite Porete
- Original title: Le Mirouer des simples âmes anienties et qui seulement demeurent en vouloir et désir d'amour
- Translator: Ellen L. Babinsky (1993)
- Cover artist: Marion Miller
- Language: Old French
- Subject: Christianity / Mysticism
- Publisher: (1993) Paulist Press
- Publication date: c. 1300
- Publication place: France
- English publication date: 1993
- Media type: Book
- Pages: 249
- ISBN: 0-8091-3427-6
- OCLC: 28378539
- Dewey Decimal: 248.2/2 20
- LC Class: BV5091.C7 P6713 1993

The Mirror of the Simple Souls
- Author: "An unknown French mystic of the thirteenth century", Clare Kirchberger ed.
- Translator: M. N.
- Language: English
- Subject: Christianity, mysticism
- Publisher: Burns Oates and Washbourne Ltd.
- Publication date: 31 October 1927
- Media type: hardback
- Pages: 303
- Dewey Decimal: 242.144

The Mirror of Simple Souls is an early 14th-century work of Christian mysticism by Marguerite Porete dealing with the workings of Divine Love.

Love in this book layeth to souls the touches of his divine works privily hid under dark speech, so that they should taste the deeper draughts of his love and drink.

— from 15th-century English translator's prologue

The full title of the work is The Mirror of the Simple Souls Who Are Annihilated and Remain Only in Will and Desire of Love. The meditations were originally written in the Picard dialect of Old French and explore in poetry and prose the seven stages of "annihilation" that the Soul goes through on its path to Oneness with God through love. It was enormously popular when written but fell foul of church authorities, which detected elements of the Brethren of the Free Spirit, an antinomian movement in its vision; denounced it as "full of errors and heresies", burnt existing copies; banned its circulation; and executed Porete herself.

However, the work was translated into Latin, Middle English, Middle French, and Old Italian and circulated in France, Italy, Germany, England and Bohemia albeit not with Porete's name attached. In fact, Porete was not identified as the author until 1946. Since then, it has been seen increasingly as one of the seminal works of medieval spiritual literature, and Porete, alongside Mechthild of Magdeburg and Hadewijch, can be seen as an example of the love mysticism of the Beguine movement.

== 20th-century rediscovery ==
A 15th-century manuscript of an English translation by "M. N." of The Mirror was found by J. A. Herbert in a manuscript collection purchased for the British Library in 1911; it was shown to Evelyn Underhill. Other 15th-century copies were subsequently found in the Bodleian library and the library of St. John's College, Cambridge, together with a Latin version made in the late 15th century by Richard Methley of Mount Grace, Yorkshire. A printed edition was edited by Clare Kirchberger from those four manuscripts, and published by Burns Oates and Washbourne Ltd., publishers to the Holy See, in 1927, complete with a nihil obstat and imprimatur.

The translation by "M. N." included a number of glosses by him and divided the text into divisions and chapters:

The French book that I shall write after is evil [i.e. badly] written and in some places for default of words and syllables the reason is away. Also, in translating French, some words need to be changed or it will fare ungoodly, not according to the sense.

— Translator's prologue

For the 1927 edition, the mediæval text was used but with spellings updated, and occasional words replaced accompanied by footnotes with additional glosses.

== See also ==
- Christian mysticism
- Meister Eckhart
- Heilwige Bloemardinne
- Speculum literature
