= Hadewijch =

13th-century Dutch poet and mystic

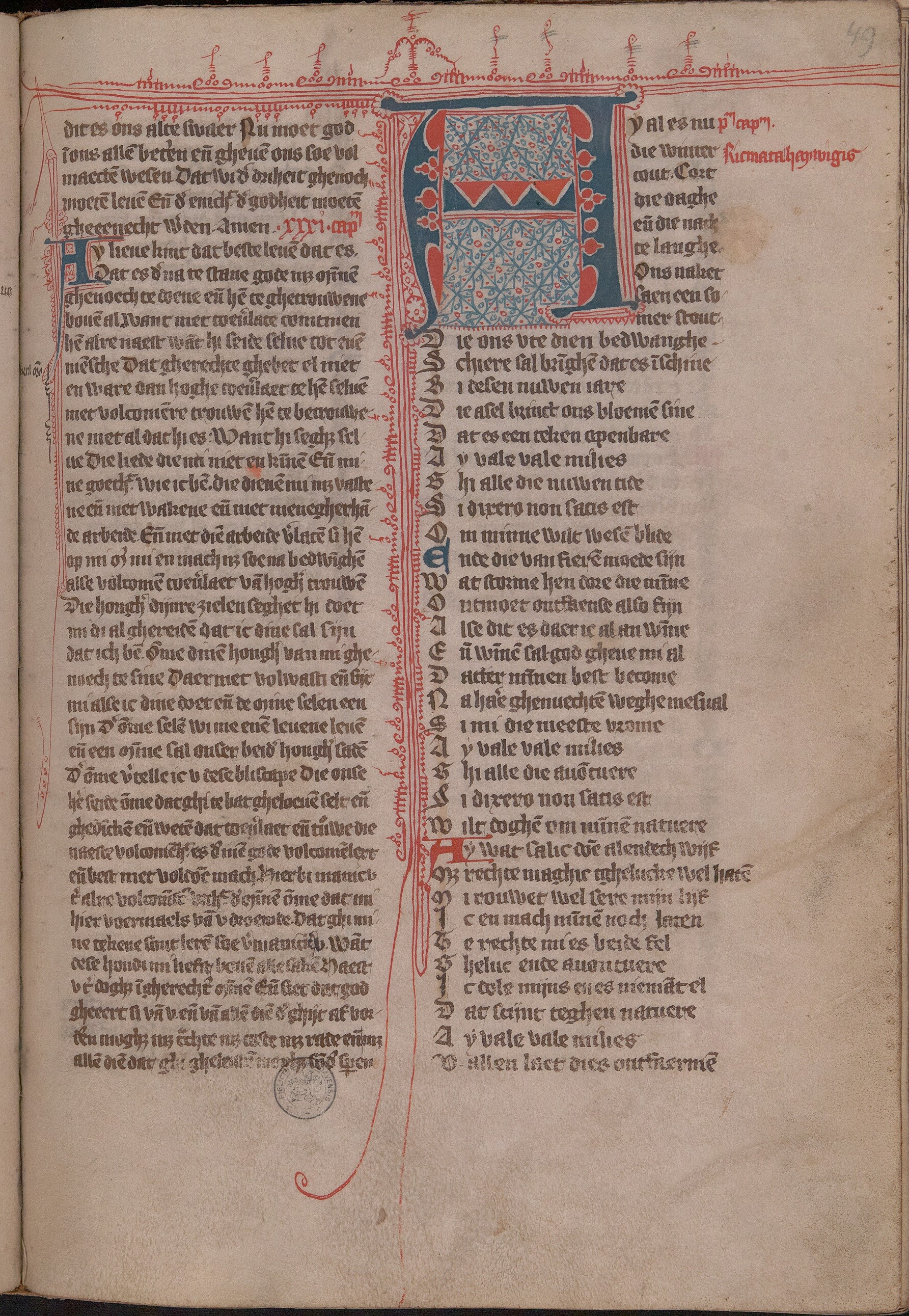
Medieval manuscript page of a Hadewijch poem

Hadewijch (Dutch pronunciation: [ˈɦaːdəʋɪx]), (1200 – 1260) sometimes referred to as Hadewych or Hadewig (of Brabant or of Antwerp), (Note: Note that in the modern state of Belgium Antwerp (the city) lies not in Brabant (the Belgian province) but in the province of Antwerp. The "of Brabant" and "of Antwerp" identifications of the 13th century Hadewijch are apparently primarily intended to distinguish her from Hadewych of Meer. Part of the evidence for her origins lies in the fact that most of the manuscripts containing her work were found near Brussels. The Antwerp connection is mainly based on a later addition to one of the manuscript copies of her works, that was produced several centuries after her death.) was a 13th-century poet and mystic. Most of her extant writings are in a Brabantian form of Middle Dutch and she probably lived in the Duchy of Brabant. Her writings include visions, prose letters and poetry. Hadewijch was one of the most important direct influences on John of Ruysbroeck.

== Life ==
She was born in 1200 in Antwerp.

No details of her life are known outside the sparse indications in her own writings. Her Letters suggest that she functioned as the head of a beguine house, but that she had experienced opposition that drove her to a wandering life. This evidence, as well as her lack of reference to life in a convent, makes the nineteenth-century theory that she was a nun problematic, and it has been abandoned by modern scholars. (Note: The 19th century understanding (based exclusively on her visions and poetry) that she would have been a nun, as described for instance in C.P. Serrure (ed.), Vaderlandsch museum voor Nederduitsche letterkunde, oudheid en geschiedenis, II (C. Annoot-Braeckman, Gent 1858), pp. 136-145, was later abandoned. That she could be identified with an abbess that presumably died in Aywières (the convent where also Saint Lutgard lived around the same time) in 1248, is considered even more unlikely in recent scholarship. For more on this, see, for instance, the writings by Paul Mommaers mentioned in the references section below.)

She came from a wealthy family and was well educated. Her writing demonstrates an expansive knowledge of the literature and theological treatises of several languages, including Latin and French, as well as French courtly poetry, in a period when studying was a luxury only exceptionally granted to women.

She had her first mystical experience at the age of 19 and went on to live in a series of religious communities.

She died in 1260.

== Beguine life ==
Beguines were Christian lay religious orders developed in the thirteenth century. Members lived in semi-monastic communities and were free to leave at any time. Beguines lived together in a home referred to as beguinages. Several larger towns had more than one beguinage. The movement was not solely for women. However, men were not known as beguines, but rather, called themselves beghards.

Hadewijch was a beguine mystic who had lived during the thirteenth century in the Low Countries, specifically in the city of Antwerp which was in the region of Brabant at the time. She shared a house with some friends, for whom she was a spiritual leader. Hadewijch is known for her poems, letters, and visions that she had described in writing.

== Works ==
Most of Hadewijch's extant writings, none of which survived the Middle Ages as an autograph, are in a Brabantian form of Middle Dutch. Many of her writings writings explored themes of divine love, spiritual experiences, and the union of soul with God.

Five groups of texts survive: her writings include poetry, descriptions of her visions, and prose letters. There are two groups of poetry: Poems in Stanzas (Strophische Gedichten) and Poems in Couplets (Mengeldichten). Finally there is the "Lijst der volmaakten" ("list of the perfect ones").

=== Poems in Stanzas (Strophische Gedichten) ===
Her forty-five Poems in Stanzas (Strophische Gedichten, also Liederen, "Songs") are lyric poems following the forms and conventions used by the trouvères and minnesingers of her time, but in Dutch, and with the theme of worldly courtship replaced by sublimated love to God. Many of them are contrafacta of Latin and vernacular songs and hymns, leading to a Dutch edition renaming them "Liederen" ("Songs") and including audio recordings of performances.

=== Poems in Couplets (Mengeldichten or Berijmde brieven) ===
The sixteen Poems in Couplets (Mengeldichten, also Berijmde brieven, "letters on rhyme") are simpler didactical poems in letter format, composed in rhyming couplets, on Christian topics; not all of them are considered authentic.

=== Visions ===
Hadewijch's Book of Visions (Visioenenboek), the earliest vernacular collection of such revelations, appears to have been composed in the 1240s. The book details fourteen visions received by Hadewijch. It prominently features dialogue between Hadewijch and Christ in visionary speech, an early example of this mode of vernacular religious instruction.

Her writings indicate that she started experiencing visions early in her life. Many of her descriptions focus on ascending to Jesus Christ while experiencing strong emotions that are almost euphoric. Another common theme throughout the visions is the agony she would describe when it came to the end of the vision. The visions focus on themes of divine love, using metaphors of nature, as well as direct visions of Christ.

=== Letters ===
Thirty prose letters also survive. Many were written to other Beguines sharing instruction and spiritual guidance. These letters provide some of the evidence that she played a role in the spiritual formation of the early Beguine movement.

=== List ===
The Lijst der volmaakten ("list of the perfect ones"), is joined to the Visions in some manuscripts, but to the Poems in Stanzas in a more recent one. It was written between 1238 and 1244. It lists several saints, including Bernard of Clairvaux, but some entries are more remarkable, such as a beguine who had been condemned to death by the inquisition.

Recent Scholarship

In the 20th century a question that was being asked about mysticism and the visions that Hadewijch had described considered what events led up to each experience, and also, were these encounters actually seen or only felt within the mystics.

Agatha Anna Bardoel suggests that the visions described by Hadewijch were a result of nothing other than a deep meditation, that, when done on a regular basis, what she was experiencing came to be quite simple and easily repeated. Based on an experiment done by Arthur J. Deikman over the course of several weeks that was related to stages of meditation, Agatha found similarities between that and the experiences described by Hadewijch. Each encounter that Hadewijch had with a higher power was indistinguishable from that of a young child experiencing something for the first time. Put simply, Hadewijch had indescribable moments within each vision much like all children do in the early years of their lives.

While Bardoel focused on the visions of Hadewijch to come to her conclusions, others have viewed her visions in relation to Hadewijch's other works to form a narrative. Mary A. Suydam takes this approach from a feminist perspective. According to Suydam, Hadewijch believed that the power held by mystics within the experiences they have had essentially outranks the hierarchy. Suydam argues that women have a better understanding and connection with their spirituality because of the experiences they have had, and that can be, and has been, overlooked without looking at Hadewijch's work as a whole.

== Influence ==
Hadewijch's writings influenced Jan van Ruusbroec both as a theologian and a mystic. Ruusbroec gathered and studied her writings, but they later fell into obscurity for almost 500 years.

She is now regarded as one of the great names in medieval Dutch literature.

== Sexuality ==
Some of Hadewijch's letters have been interpreted as alluding to same-sex attraction or desire. In Letter 25 she describes her powerful, unrequited feelings for a woman named Sara, as well as her close relationship with two women named Emma and Margriet:

Greet Sara also in my behalf, whether I am anything to her or nothing. Could I be fully all that in my love I wish to be for her, I would gladly do so; and I shall do so fully, however she may treat me. She has very largely forgotten my affliction, but I do not wish to blame or reproach her, seeing that Love [Minne] leaves her at rest, and does not reproach her, although Love ought ever anew to urge her to be busy with her noble Beloved. Now that she has other occupations and can look on quietly and tolerate my heart's affliction, she lets me suffer. She is well aware, however, that she should be a comfort to me, both in this life of exile and in the other life in bliss. There she will indeed be my comfort, although she now leaves me in the lurch.

And you, Emma and yourself-who can obtain more from me than any other person now living can, except Sara-are equally dear to me. But both of you turn too little to Love, who has so fearfully subdued me in the commotion of unappeased love. My heart, soul, and senses have not a moment's rest, day or night; the flame burns constantly in the very marrow of my soul.

Tell Margriet to be on her guard against haughtiness, and to be sensible, and to attend to God each day; and that she may apply herself to the attainment of perfection and prepare herself to live with us, where we shall one day be together; and that she should neither live nor remain with aliens. It would be a great disloyalty if she deserted us, since she so much desires to satisfy us, and she is now close to us - indeed, very close - and we also so much desire her to be with us.

Once I heard a sermon in which Saint Augustine was spoken of. No sooner had I heard it than I became inwardly so on fire that it seemed to me everything on earth must be set ablaze by the flame I felt within me. Love is all!

— Hadewijch, Letter 25

== Veneration ==
In 2022, Hadewijch was officially added to the Episcopal Church liturgical calendar with a feast day on 22 April.

== Sources ==
=== Editions, translations, and recordings ===
- Hart, Columba, ed. (1980), Hadewijch: The Complete Works, Paulist Press, ISBN 9780809122974 ISBN 0-8091-2297-9
- Marieke J. E. H. T. van Baest (essay and translations), preface by Edward Schillebeeckx (1998), Poetry of Hadewijch, Peeters ISBN 90-429-0667-7
- Veerle Fraeters; Frank Willaert (2009), Liederen, Historische Uitgeverij, ISBN 978-90-6554-478-0

=== Studies ===
- Bardoel, Agatha (1992). Vision or union? : mystical expression in the visions of Hadewijch of Brabant, c. 1250. University of Toronto.
- Swan, Laura. The Wisdom of the Beguines: the Forgotten Story of a Medieval Women's Movement (BlueBridge, 2014).
- Dailey, Patricia (2013). "Living Song: Dwelling in Hadewijch's Liederen". Promised Bodies: Time, Language, and Corporeality in Medieval Women's Mystical Texts. Columbia University Press. pp. 123–56.
- Fraeters, Veerle (2013). "Hadewijch of Brabant and the Beguine Movement". A Companion to Mysticism and Devotion in Northern Germany in the Late Middle Ages. Brill. pp. 49–72. ISBN 9789004258457.
- McGinn, Bernard (1999). The Flowering of Mysticism. pp. 200–244.
- Mommaers, Paul (2005), Hadewijch: Writer – Beguine – Love Mystic, Elisabeth M. Dutton, trans., Peeters, ISBN 9789042913929 ISBN 90-429-1392-4
- Rozenski, Steven (2010), "The Promise of Eternity: Love and Poetic Form in Hadewijch's Liederen or Stanzaic Poems", Exemplaria, 22 (4): 305–325, doi:10.1179/104125710X12730486676225, S2CID 218668701
- Suydam, Mary (1999). "Beguine Textuality: Sacred Performances". In Suydam, Mary; Ziegler, Joanna (eds.). Performance and Transformation: New Approaches to Late Medieval Spirituality. pp. 169–210.
