= Great Beguinage, Sint-Amandsberg =

Beguinage in Ghent, Belgium

Coordinates: 51.0569°N 3.7478°E

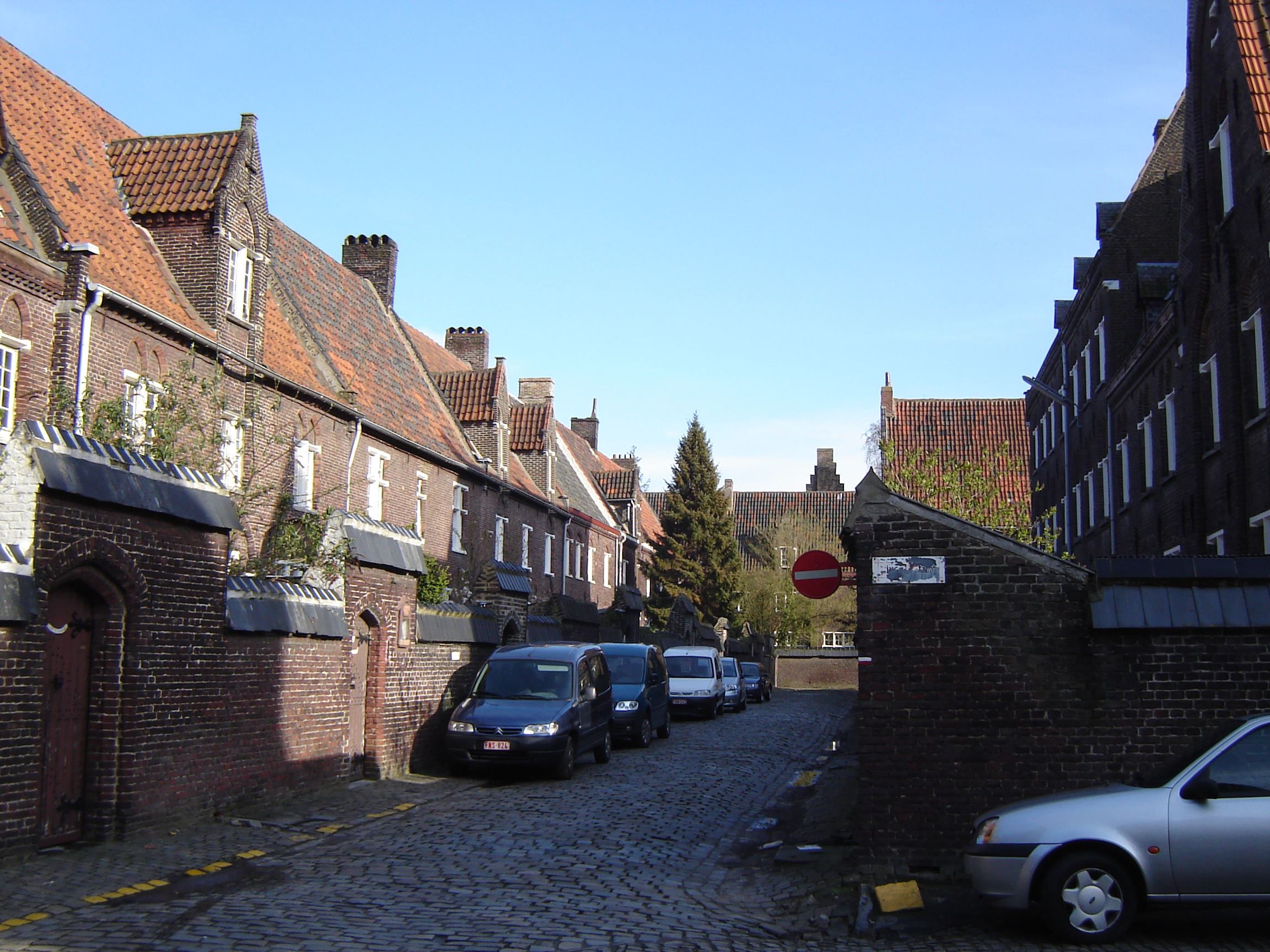
Sint-Amandstraat

The Great Beguinage of Sint-Amandsberg (Dutch: Groot Begijnhof van Sint-Amandsberg) is an eight-hectare beguinage in the Sint-Amandsberg suburb, just outside the centre of Ghent, Belgium. It was built between 1873 and 1874 on the abandonment of the Old St. Elizabeth Beguinage in the city centre. There is also a third beguinage in Ghent, that of Our-Lady Ter Hooyen.

== History ==
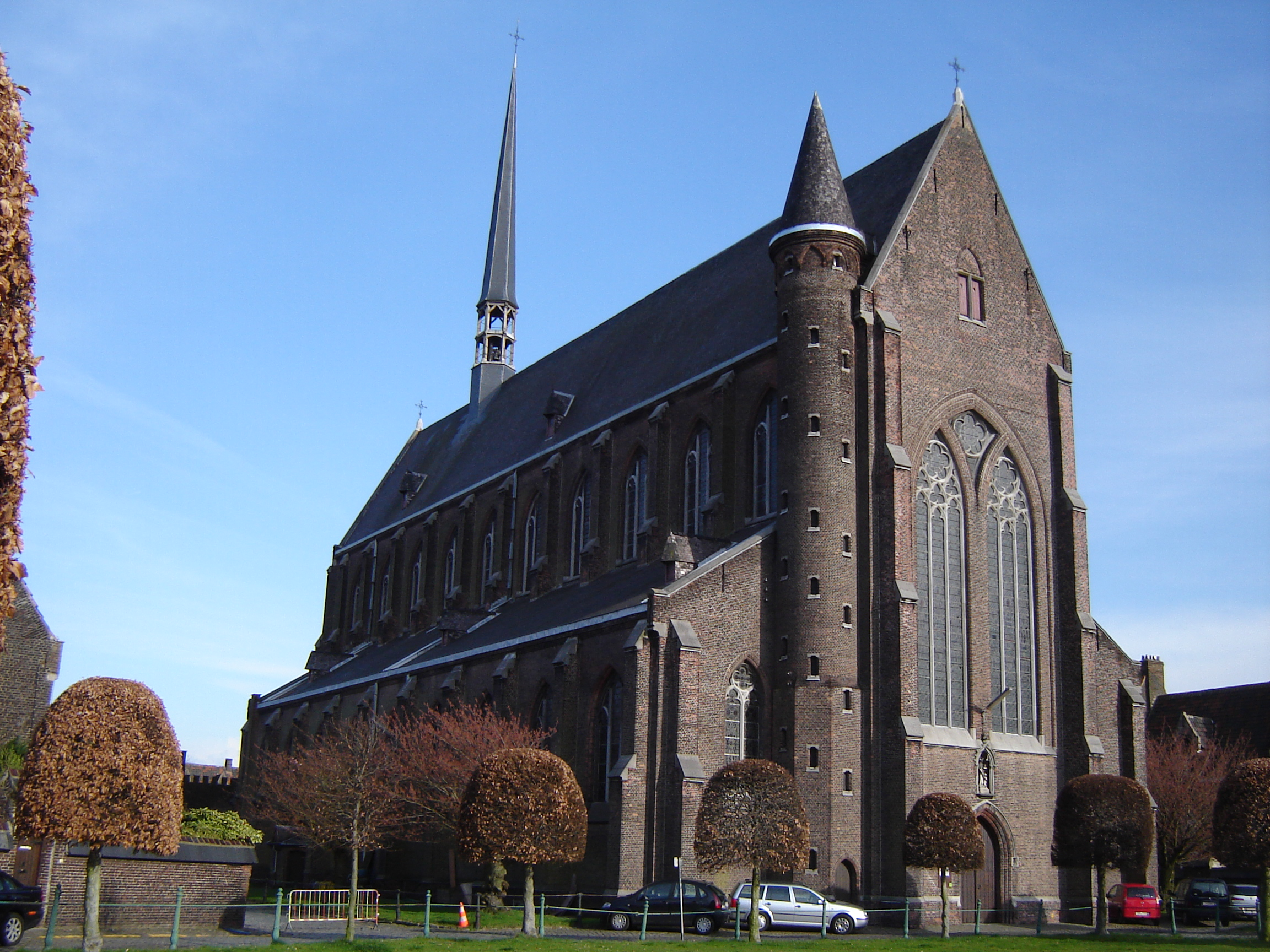
Its church

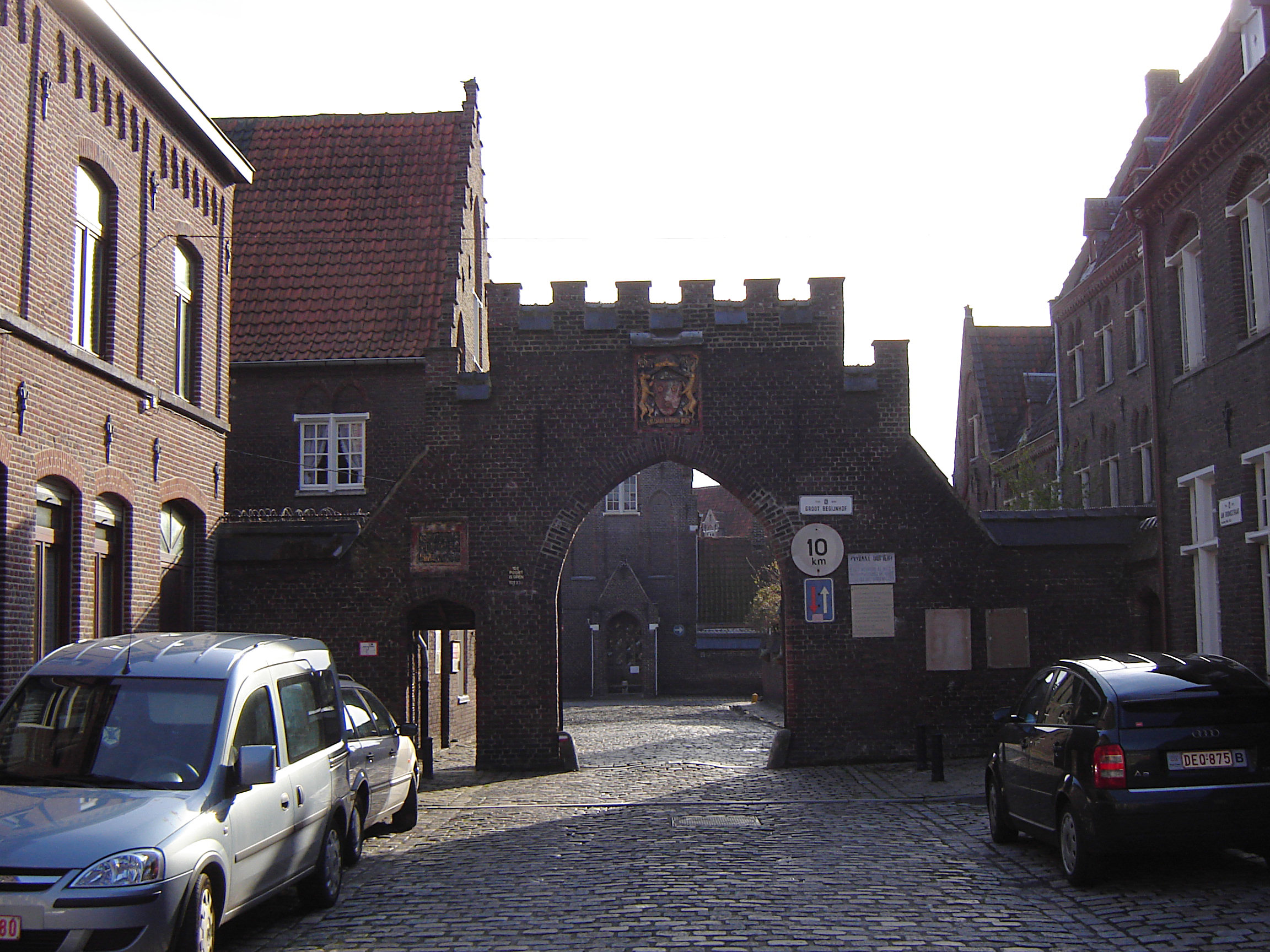
Gateway

Around 1234, Joanne of Constantinople founded a small and large beguinage in Ghent, both dedicated to Elizabeth of Hungary, also known as Saint Elizabeth of Thuringia. In the second half of the 19th century, these fell into difficulties with the city authorities, since they were on sites needed for urban expansion. New streets were being built and new canals cut, so their isolated nature was lost. Eventually, the city sought an alternative site for the beguinages outside the city centre.

Engelbert, 8th Duke of Arenberg had already bought the large and small beguinages and he also bought a site on the Sint-Baafskouter, where construction of a new beguinage began in 1873. It was fully planned by the architect Arthur Verhaegen and with a large central aisled church by Jean-Baptiste de Bethune, dedicated to Saint Elizabeth, Saint Michael and the Holy Angels. It has a curtain wall with two entrance gates. Each house and convent except the Groothuis has a front lawn and is enclosed by walls, with niches holding saints above or beside gates in the garden walls. It is the only neo-Gothic beguinage in Flanders.

The beguinage was completed in only two years with eighteen builders working on it simultaneously. It became operational on 29 September 1874 with about 600 beguines and its church was opened on 28 September the following year, with more decoration added the year after. It was classed as a monument in 1994 and listed as part of the Flanders Beguinages World Heritage Site in 1998. The last beguines died in January and August 2003 and the buildings were gradually converted to other functions, particularly for charities.
