= Great Beguinage, Leuven =

Beguinage in Leuven, Belgium

Great Beguinage of Leuven
UNESCO World Heritage Site
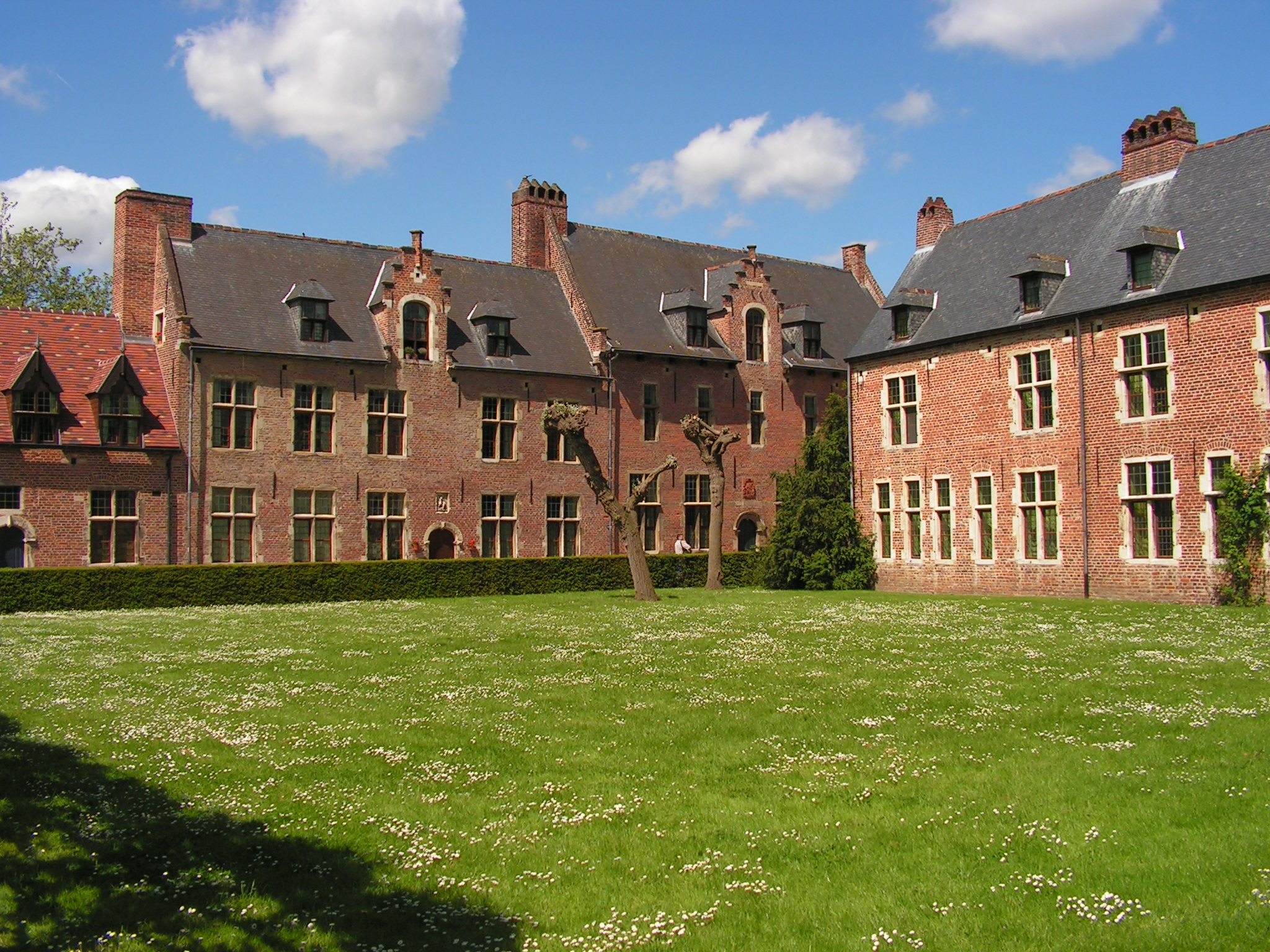

- Location within Belgium
- Location: Leuven, Flemish Brabant, Belgium
- Part of: Flemish Béguinages
- Criteria: Cultural: (ii), (iii), (iv)
- Reference: 855-011
- Inscription: 1998 (22nd Session)
- Area: 4.2 ha (10 acres)
- Website: www.visitleuven.be/en/great-beguinage
- Coordinates: 50°52′15.6″N 4°41′46.3″E

The Great Beguinage of Leuven (Dutch: Groot Begijnhof van Leuven) is a well-preserved beguinage and completely restored historical quarter containing a dozen streets in the south of downtown Leuven, Belgium. About 3 hectares (7.4 acres) in size, with some 300 apartments in almost 100 houses, it is one of the largest remaining beguinages in the Low Countries. It stretches on both sides of the river Dyle, which splits into two canals inside the beguinage, thus forming an island. Three bridges connect the parts of the beguinage. The complete beguinage is owned by the University of Leuven and used as a campus, especially for housing academics.

== History ==
As a community for unmarried, semi-religious women (see beguine), the Beguinage of Leuven originated in the early 13th century. The oldest written documents date back from 1232. A Latin inscription on the church mentions 1234 as founding date. The community is presumably a few decades older. Local historians from the 16th century, including Justus Lipsius, mention 1205 as founding date.

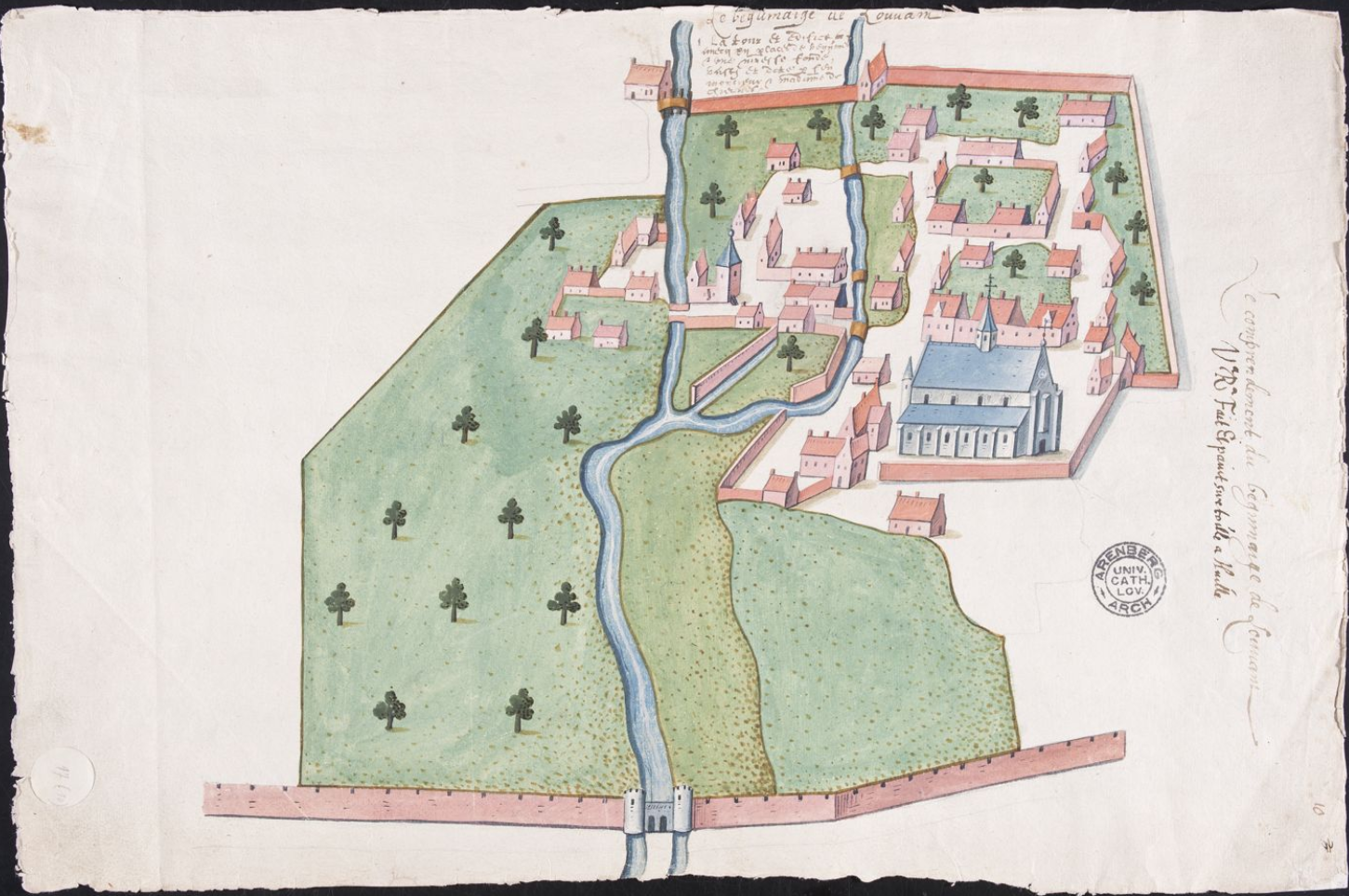
View of the Beguinage of Leuven, c. 1600

Just like other beguinages in Flanders, the Beguinage of Leuven had a first golden age in the 13th century, and difficult times during the religious conflicts in the 16th century. One of the priests of this beguinage was Adriaan Florensz Boeyens, spiritual tutor of the infant Charles V and later known as Pope Adrian VI.

From the end of the 16th century, and especially after the Twelve Years' Truce in 1621, the beguinage had a second flourishing period, culminating near the last quarter of the 17th century and continuing afterwards, albeit in a gradual decline, until the invasion of the anti-religious French Revolutionarists. The peak in entries occurred with a time span of two generations in the period 1650–1670, when the number of beguines reached 360. Near 1700, the number had already fallen back to 300, due to warfare (including the Nine Years War) and diseases. By the mid of the 18th century, the number of beguines was further reduced to approximately 250. The sudden increase in entries, followed by a long period of gradual decline, explains the homogeneity in the architectural style of the houses, most of which were constructed in the years 1630–1670. The same demographic evolution can be seen in other beguinages, such as in the nearby town of Diest, or – with some delay – in Lier (where the houses are on the average half a century younger than in Leuven). After the invasion of the French revolutionaries, the beguinage of Leuven was not sold as bien national, as happened with most monasteries and abbeys. The properties of the community were, however, confiscated and attributed to the local welfare commission (the Hospices civils) and reorganised as civil almshouses. Beguines were allowed to continue to live in their houses but free rooms were rented to elderly and poor people. Some former clerics lived on their mandatory pension in the beguinage, among them the last prior of Villers Abbey.

The last priest of the beguine community died in 1977 at the age of 107. He is buried in the graveyard of Park Abbey. The last beguine died in 1988.

== Restoration ==
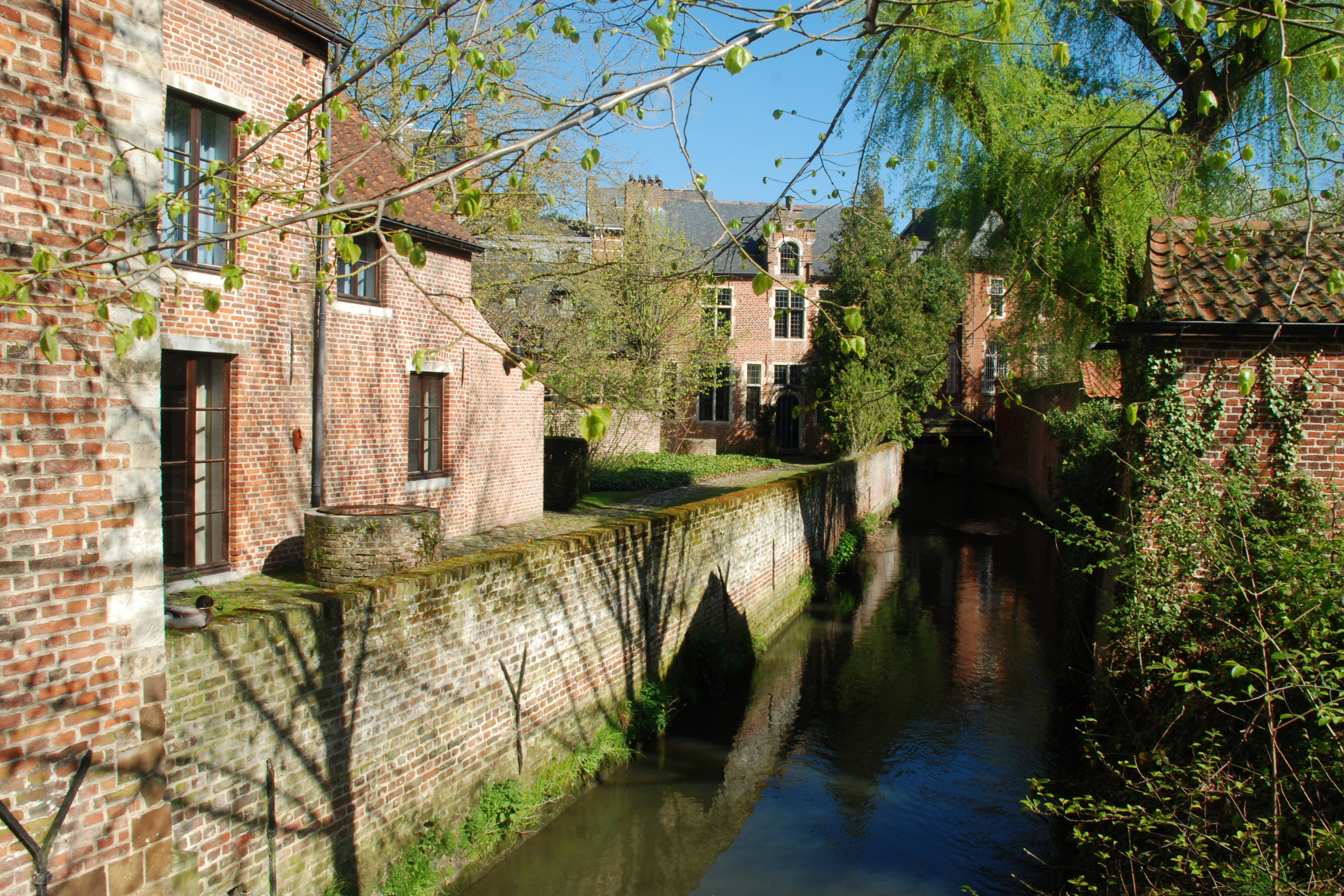
Canal of the river Dyle in the Beguinage of Leuven

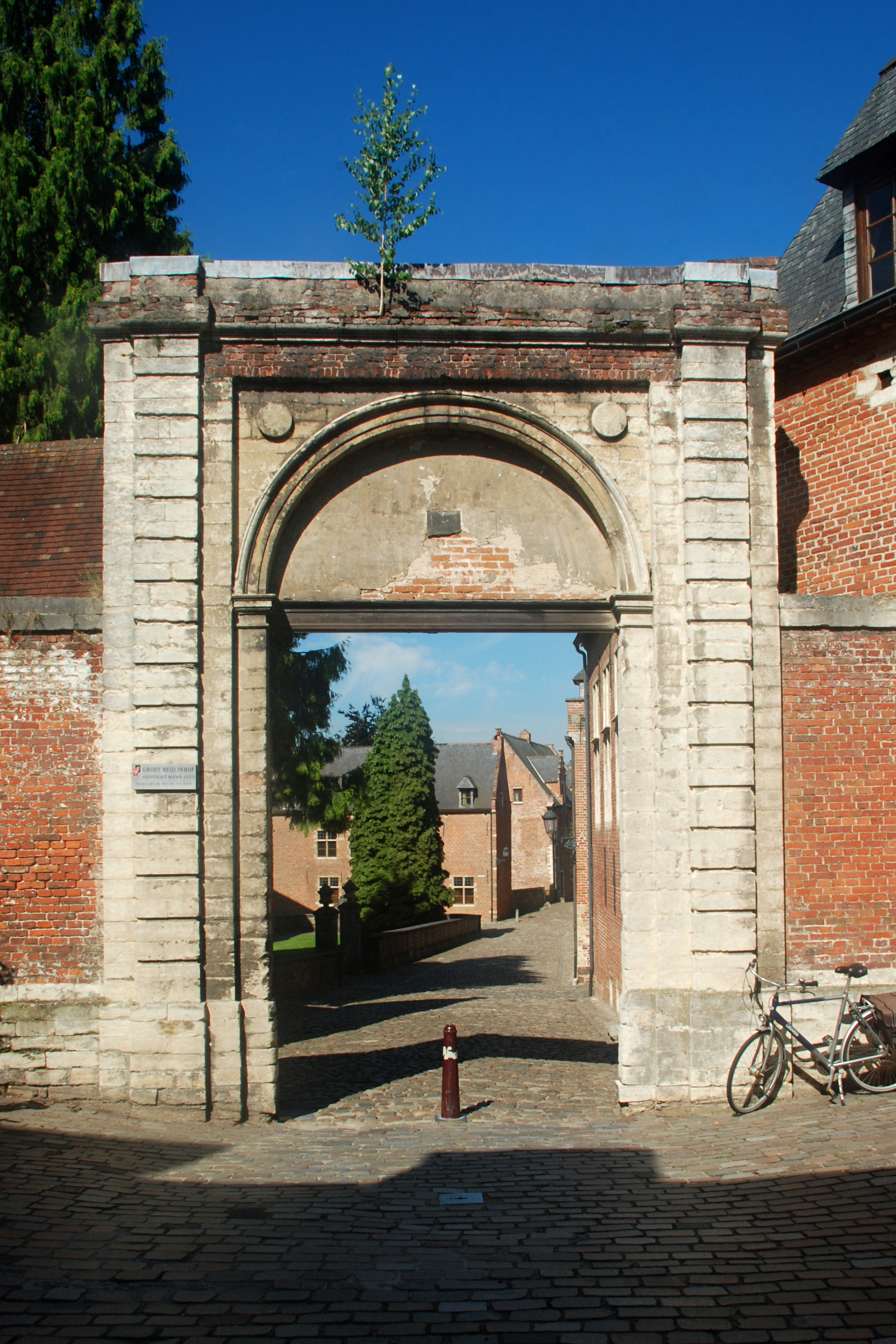
Main entrance gate ("Grote Poort")

After more than 150 years in use by the local welfare commission and being inhabited by people not financially able to maintain the dwellings, the place was in deplorable state in 1960. The welfare commission decided to sell the complete quarter. A real estate developer showed interest but abandoned his plans when he learnt that the university wanted to buy and restore the beguinage. This small town was restored between 1964 and 1989 by the Catholic University of Leuven, which had purchased the site in 1962 from the Social Welfare Commission. The restoration proceeded in two phases. The majority of the streets were restored in the 1960s and 1970s, under supervision of professor Raymond M. Lemaire. The church and the street next to it were restored in 1980s. The large scale restoration project of an entire quarter, and according to the principles of the Venice Charter, was an important momentum in the popularity of beguinages and traditional architecture in general. In 1998, it was officially recognised by UNESCO as a World Heritage Site.

== Architecture ==
The Great Beguinage has the appearance of a small town on its own, with houses planned along a network of narrow streets and small squares. This is in contrast to the beguinages of Bruges and Amsterdam, where all houses face a central courtyard. The only large greenyard, on the left river bank, resulted from the demolition of some houses in the 19th century. Five houses date back from the 16th century, three of which still show timber framing. The house of Chièvres was built in 1561, in accordance with the will of Maria van Hamal, widow of William de Croÿ, duke of Aarschot and advisor in political affairs of Emperor Charles V. The characteristic tented roof with the onion-shaped top, refers to the two towers of the duke's castle in Heverlee (today known as Arenberg Castle).

The majority of the houses date back from the period 1630–1670. They were constructed in the local, traditional architecture, enriched with some sober, baroque elements. The facades show red bricks with sandstone cross-bar frames for windows and doors. A typical element in the beguinage of Leuven are the numerous dormers, often elaborated with crow-stepped gables and round arched windows. Many houses have strikingly few and small windows on the ground floor. The beguines were keen on their privacy. Houses with large windows on the ground floor used to be hidden by an additional wall, as is still the case in other beguinages. A few houses were replaced or constructed in the 19th century, but far less than in other beguinages, such as in Lier.

The church is an early Gothic basilica with Romanesque elements. As usual for mendicant orders or women's congregations, it has no tower, only a flèche. Since 1998, this flèche has carried a small carillon, which plays a short melody every half an hour on 16 bells which had come from the carillon of the Leuven library tower. In 2009, 29 new bells and a baton-type keyboard for manual playing were added to the instrument. The north entrance of the church shows two Latin inscriptions indicating the foundation years of beguinage (1234 - anno domini MCCXXXIIII curia incepit) and church (1305). The east end of the church has a strikingly tall 14th century quire window, whose upper part illuminates the attic above the groin vault constructed in the 17th century. The interior is 27 meters wide (the widest church in town) containing a nave and two aisles of ten bays. Daylight is prominently present. The arcades separating nave from aisles carry statues of the twelve apostles, Mary and Saint Joseph with the holy child. These statues, as most other artwork, are sober Baroque. They are accentuated by artificial shades in black paint behind them. The restoration in the 1980s revealed 14th-century murals.

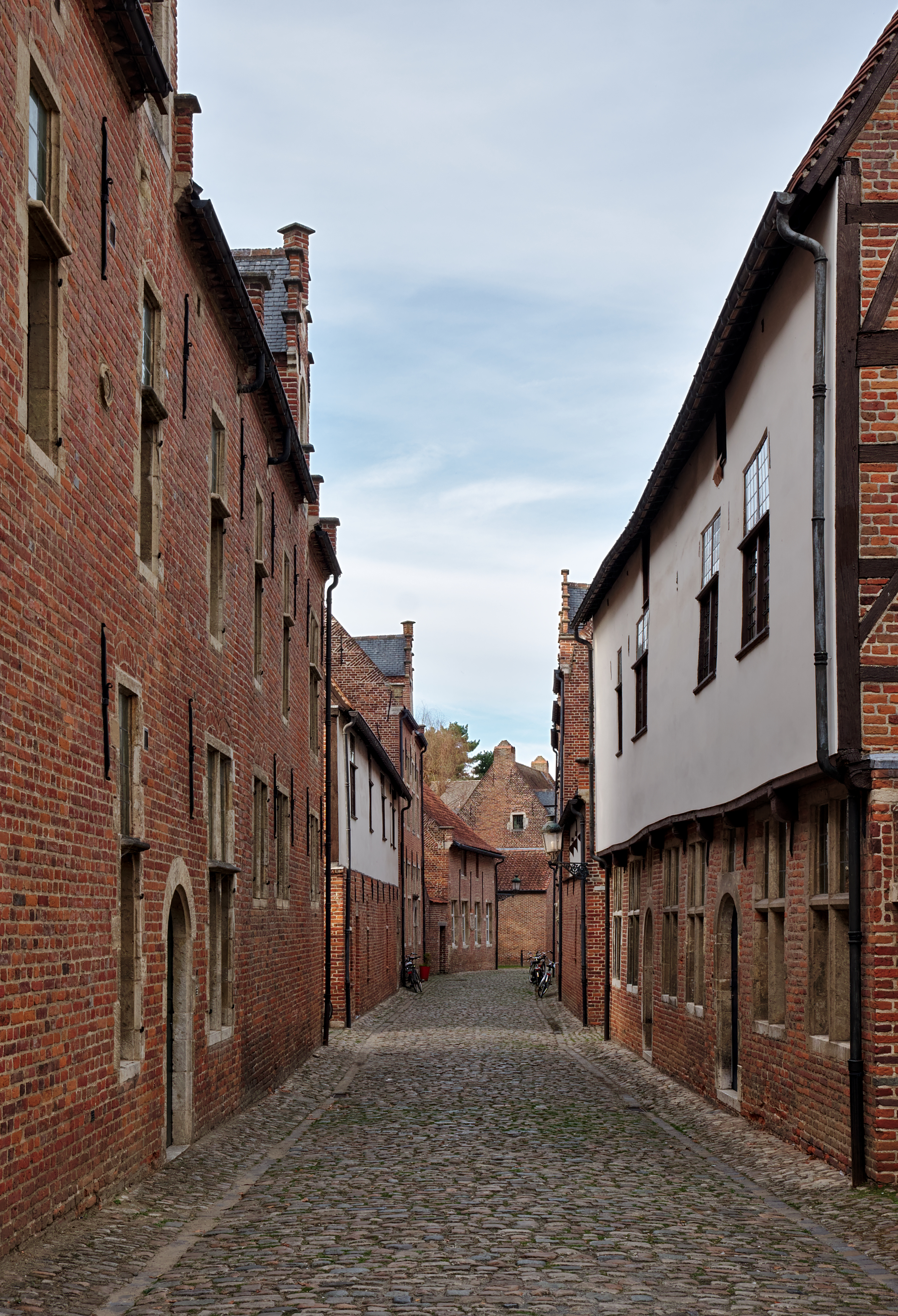
Narrow street in the Great Beguinage

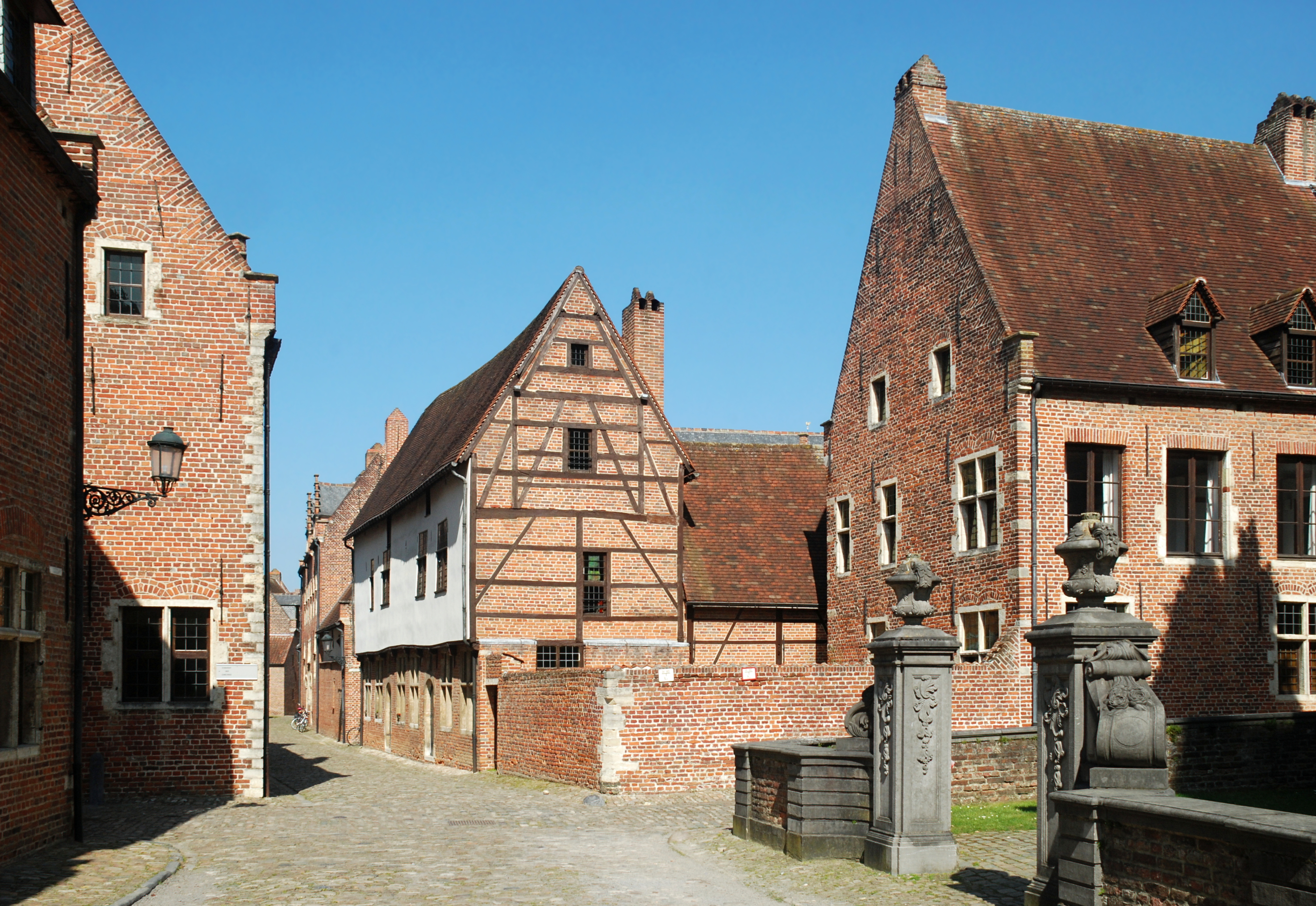
Half-timbered house "Sint Helena"

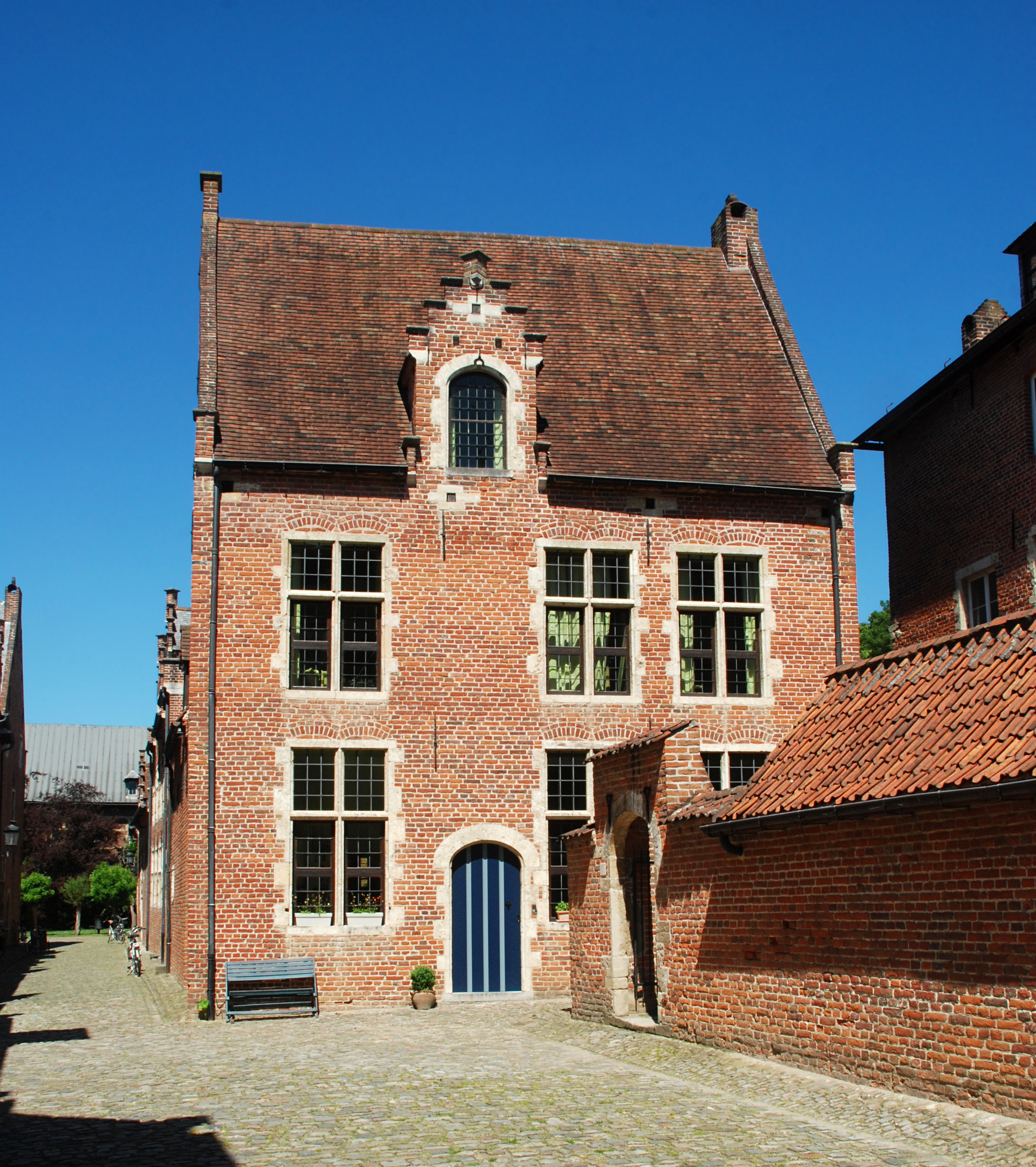
House "Sint Alexius"

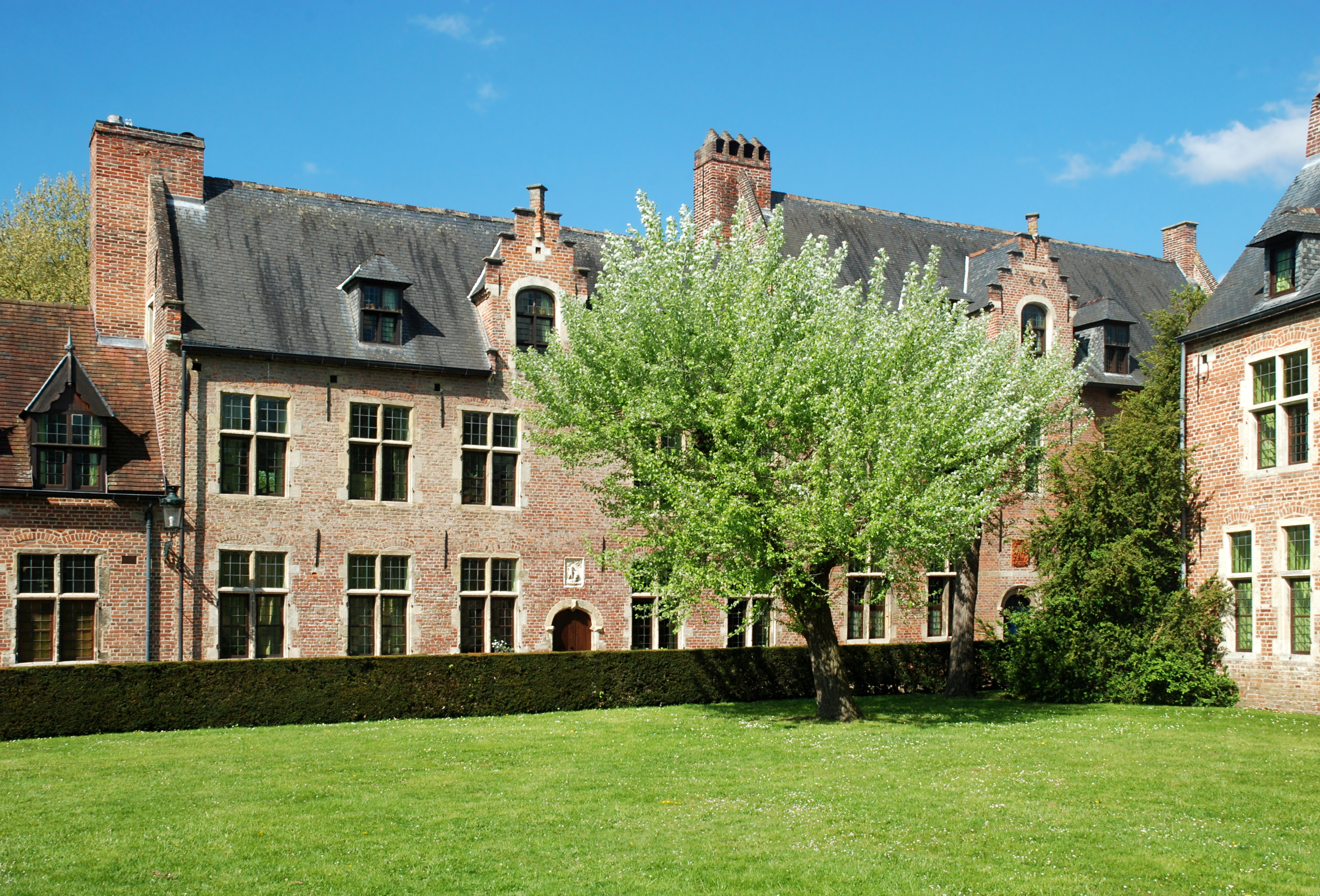
Convent of "Onze-Lieve-Vrouw Presentatie"

== Ten Hove and Aborg ==
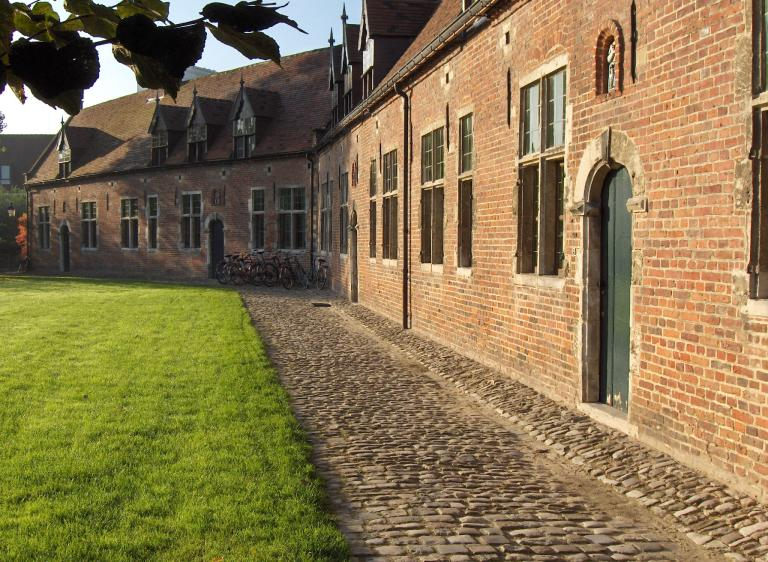
Spanish quarter. This 17th-century extension of the Beguinage is also known as Aborg, meaning "Old Castle".

The name of the quarter of the beguinage, Ten Hove (Hof = Court), as well as the old name of the left river bank (Aborg = Vetus Castellum = Old Castle) seem to refer to previous settlement, possibly the court of the first Lords of Leuven. This would then have been the field where the battle of Leuven took place. In 891, the Emperor Arnulf of Carinthia ended here in the invasions of the Vikings. No hard evidence for the hypothesis was ever found in the beguinage, and so, some authors contest the present day beguinage as being the precise location of the battle.

== Notable residents ==
- Anne van Doeveryn (1549–1625), poet

== Sources ==
This article is based on the Dutch Wikipedia article Groot Begijnhof (Leuven).

== Bibliography ==
- (in French) Bourguignon, M. (1933) Inventaire des archives de l'Assistance publique de la ville de Louvain. Tongeren: Michiels-Broeders
- (in Dutch) Cockx, E. and Fabri, L. (1994) Het Groot-Begijnhof van Leuven, een eigenzinnig verhaal van een eigenzinnige beweging. Tielt: Lannoo.
- (in Dutch) Heirman, M. (2001) Langs Vlaamse begijnhoven. Leuven: Davidsfonds
- Olyslager, W. A. (1983) The Groot Begijnhof of Leuven. Leuven University Press, Leuven, ISBN 2-8017-0212-9.
- Uytterhoeven, R. (2000) The Groot Begijnhof of Leuven. Leuven University Press, Leuven, ISBN 90-5867-019-8.
- Van Aerschot, S. and Heirman, M. (2001) Flemish Beguinages. World Heritage. Davidsfonds, Leuven, ISBN 90-5826-147-6.
