= Holy Corner (disambiguation) =

Holy Corner is an area in Edinburgh, Scotland.

Holy Corner may also refer to:

- Holy Corner (Ghent Béguinage), in Ghent, Belgium
- Holy Corners Historic District, in St. Louis, in the U.S. state of Missouri
