= Begijnhof, Utrecht =

Inner court in Utrecht, Netherlands

Coordinates: 52°5′44.79″N 5°7′18.08″E

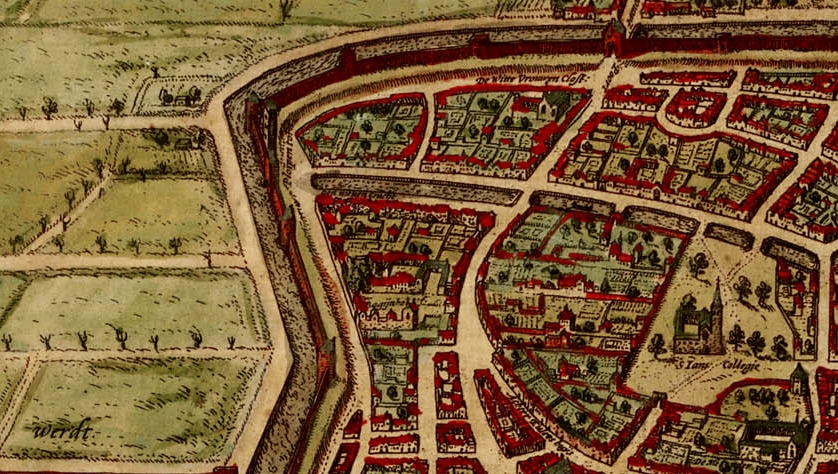
Part of a map of the city c. 1572. The Begijnhof is in the centre. NB: east is to the top.

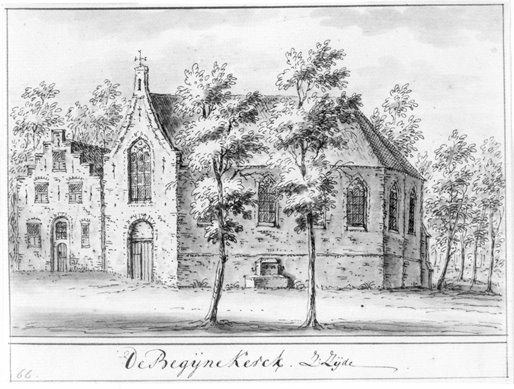
Chapel of the Begijnhof about 1725, illustrated by Jacobus Stellingwerff

The Begijnhof was a beguinage in Utrecht, Netherlands.

== History ==
The beguinage was located in the northern part of the city. The accepted date for the settlement there of the beguines is the second quarter of the 13th century. The enclosed but extensive site included a chapel, a groothuys ("big house") in multiple occupancy and a moeshof (communal garden). There were also a number of small houses which belonged to individual beguines. In addition, several more beguines lived to the south-east of the beguinage in an area called Het Heilige Leven ("The Holy Life"). There is no information on the precise number of beguines or on the details of their rule of life, but it seems likely that they were numerous. From about 1400 the Begijnhof was assured of the protection of begijnmeesters ("beguine masters") provided by the city, although the measure was as much about control as protection. In the 15th century various bishops and archbishops of Utrecht ordered the city to protect the beguines.

After the Reformation (circa 1580) the Begijnhof increasingly lost its independence; in 1613 the beguines were forbidden to carry out Roman Catholic worship, and orders were passed concerning the transmission of property and the allocation of living spaces to Protestant townswomen. By about 1675, the Begijnhof had effectively ceased to exist, as in that year the sources of income of the few remaining beguines from the municipal authority were stopped.

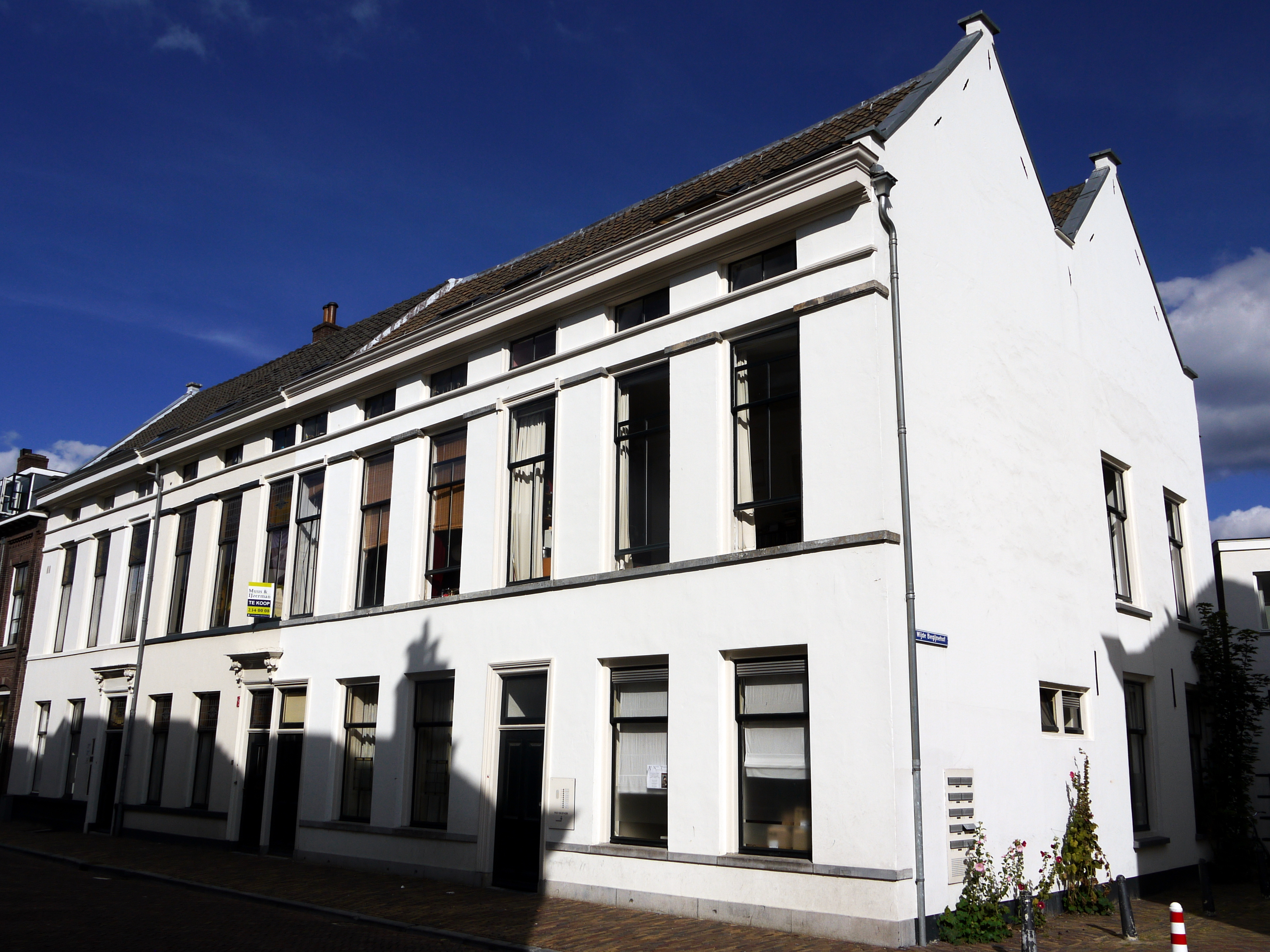
15-21 Wijde Begijnestraat

As the beguinage lost its independence the builders moved in on its site: new streets were laid out and new houses built. In the aftermath the Begijnekerk ("Beguine Church") was named after the previous beguinage, and some of the new streets, such as the Wijde Begijnestraat, owe their names to it. Of the original buildings of the Begijnhof very little remains: there are a few converted buildings or fragments reused from demolished ones. The chapel, after use as a stable, was converted to a dwelling house in about 1840; substantial parts of the structure are present in the house Wijde Begijnestraat 112. Also, the terrace of houses in the same street numbered 15-21 is in origin a house of the beguinage converted in about 1840.

== Sources ==
- René van Weeren, Begijnhof, Utrecht, The Netherlands (in English)
