= Great St. Elizabeth Beguinage, Ghent =

Beguinage in Ghent, Belgium

Great Beguinage of Ghent
UNESCO World Heritage Site
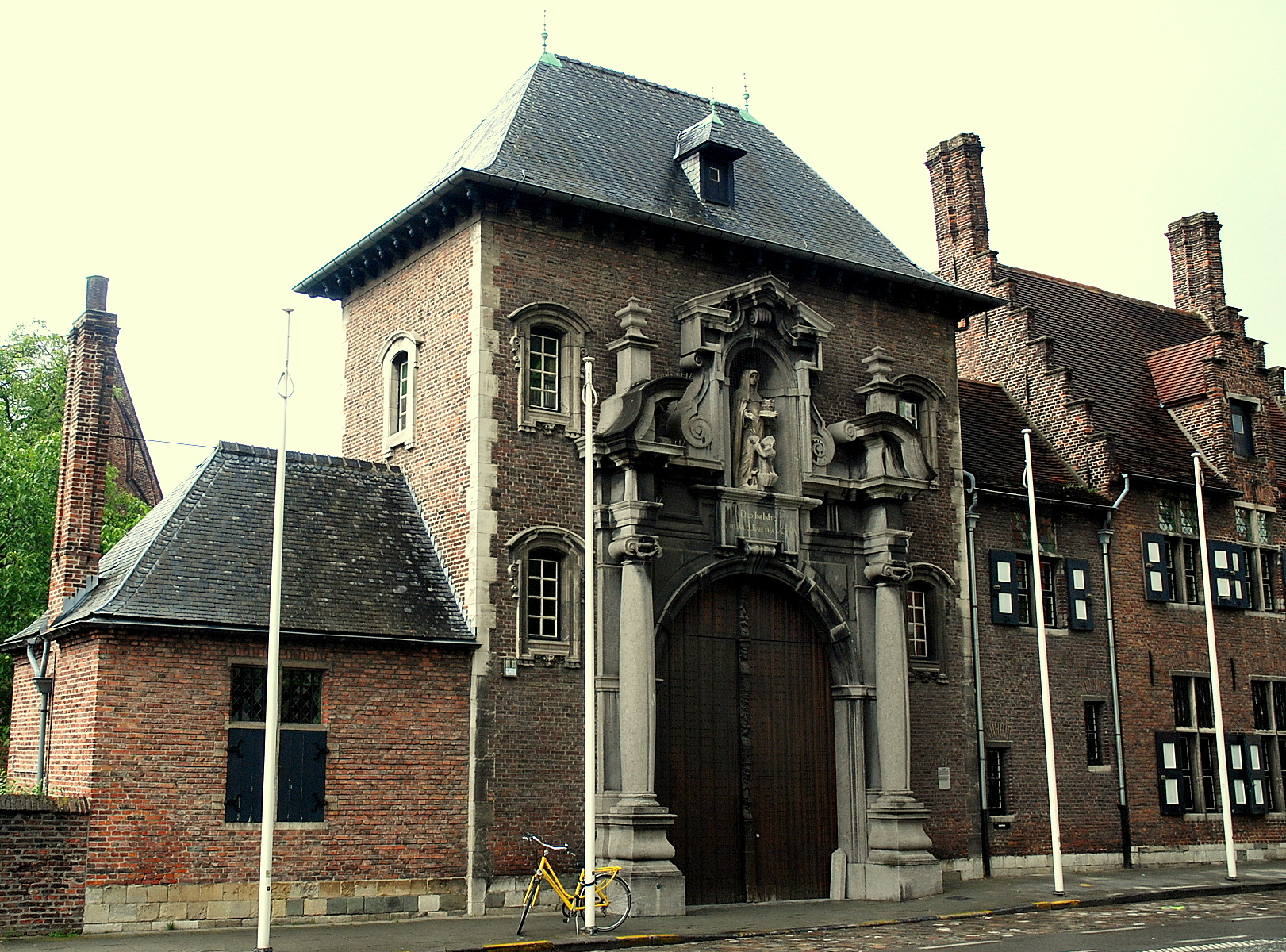

- Location within Belgium
- Location: Ghent, East Flanders, Belgium
- Part of: Flemish Béguinages
- Criteria: Cultural: (ii), (iii), (iv)
- Reference: 855-011
- Inscription: 1998 (22nd Session)
- Website: visit.gent.be/en/see-do/great-st-elizabeth-beguinage-ghent
- Coordinates: 51°03′26″N 3°42′43″E

The Great St. Elizabeth Beguinage (Dutch: Groot Begijnhof Sint-Elisabeth), also known as the Old St. Elizabeth Beguinage (Dutch: Oud Begijnhof Sint-Elisabeth) or the Holy Corner, is a beguinage in Ghent, Belgium. It is one of three beguinages in the city – the other two are the New St. Elizabeth Beguinage in the suburb of Sint-Amandsberg and Our Lady Ter Hooyen in the Lange Violettenstraat. Both St. Elizabeth beguinages were named after Elizabeth of Hungary, also known as Saint Elizabeth of Thuringia.

== History ==
=== Foundation and early history ===
In the 13th century, a number of devout, unmarried and lay women, who had been helping the Cistercian sisters with their medical work, were given their own premises by Countess Joanna of Constantinople, daughter to Baldwin IX of Flanders, who also helped with the construction of the Hospital in Lille named after her (L'hospice de la Comtesse Jeanne, built in 1236).

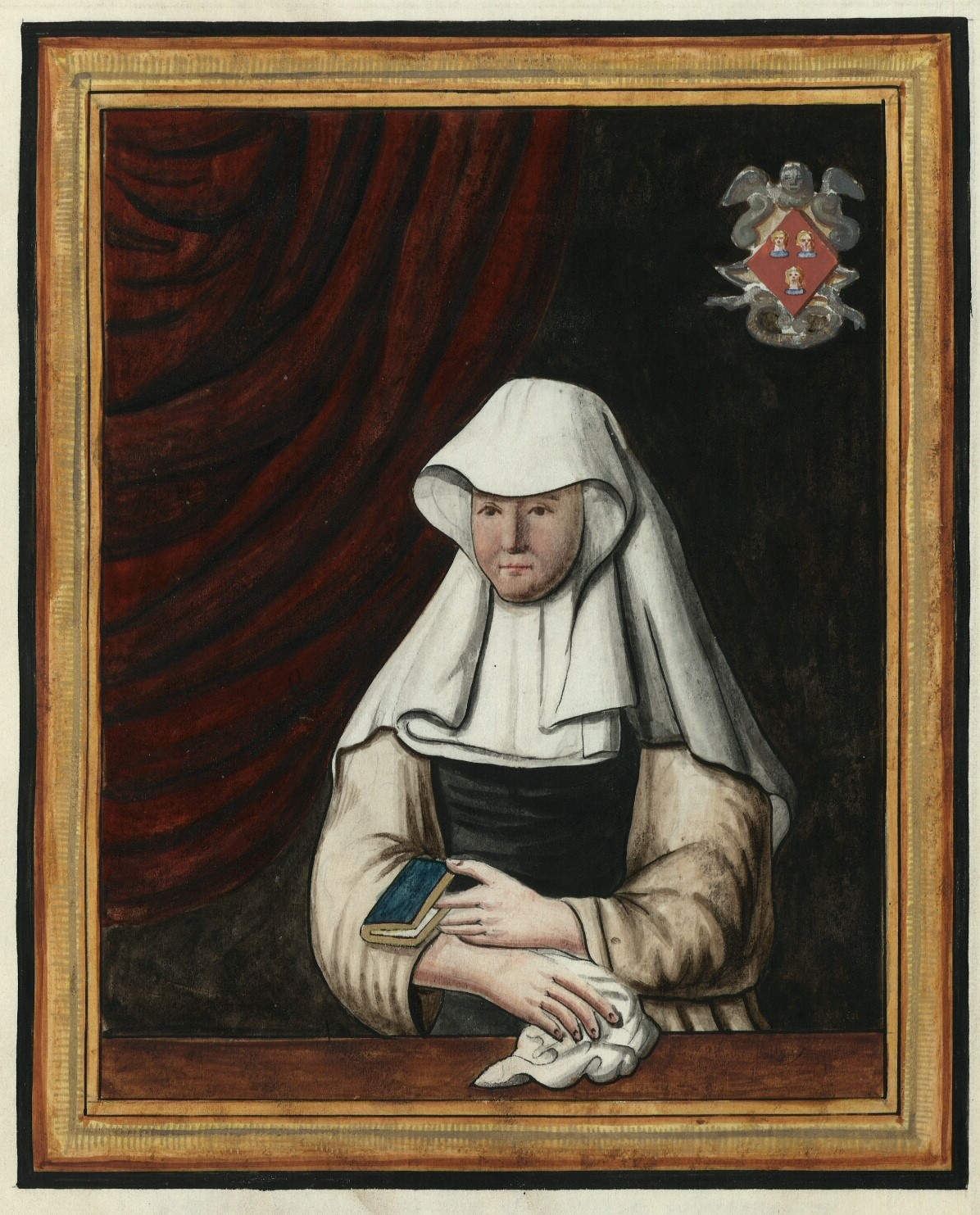
A beguine of Ghent. Excerpt from a manuscript of the Beguinage of St. Aubertus in Ghent, c. 1840.

The beguinage was constructed in 1234, and soon named after Saint Elizabeth who was canonized in 1236. It grew into a little town of its own, with a church, a "Grootjuffer" house, an infirmary (with its own chapel), 18 convents, a big laundry meadow (used by the beguines who took in laundry of rich Ghent inhabitants) and a large orchard.

=== Closure and subsequent usage ===
During the French Revolution, the city of Ghent acquired the property rights to the beguinage (on the legal provision of having to subsidize and maintain it). This actually happened to all church property in Belgium, but as the beguinage was not solely an area used for religious activities, the city repeatedly tried to incorporate it in new development, as Ghent was experiencing the effects of the Industrial Revolution and needed cheap housing for its increasing working force.

After a number of beguines voluntarily settled in a new beguinage at Our Lady Ter Hoyen, the conflict between the St. Elizabeth Beguinage and the town administration dominated by the liberal party became intense. Thanks to financial sponsoring by the Duke of Arenberg (also known as the Prinz von Recklinghausen), in two years' time (1872–1874), a new beguinage was built at the then still independent village of Sint-Amandsberg. On 29 September 1874, more than 600 beguines left Ghent for Sint-Amandsberg, in carriages provided by the Ghent Roman Catholic aristocracy.

After the departure of the beguines, the beguinage became a social housing area. There was less investment in infrastructure and accommodation and the area became a prime example of urban decay. However, in the 20th century, some voices started to be heard that clamoured for the preservation of this unique urban site. Thanks to this, both private enterprise and the town of Ghent started to invest more into local housing, and from 1984, the neighbourhood even began to feel the effects of gentrification. As often, artists were the first to come here: Constant Permeke, Albert Servaes and Frits Van den Berghe all once lived at Van Akenstraat, 7 (but not simultaneously).

== Location ==
The Great St. Elizabeth Beguinage is a protected urban heritage site. It is now a largely urban neighbourhood in the northeast of Ghent, close to the Rabot (originally a Spanish fortification, now a Ghent neighbourhood as well), between the Burgstraat and the Begijnhoflaan. It can easily be reached by general transport. Since its newest addition is the Russian Orthodox church, it is notable that tram 4, the quickest connection from Gent-Sint-Pieters railway station, has as its final destination the Ghent neighbourhood of Moscou.

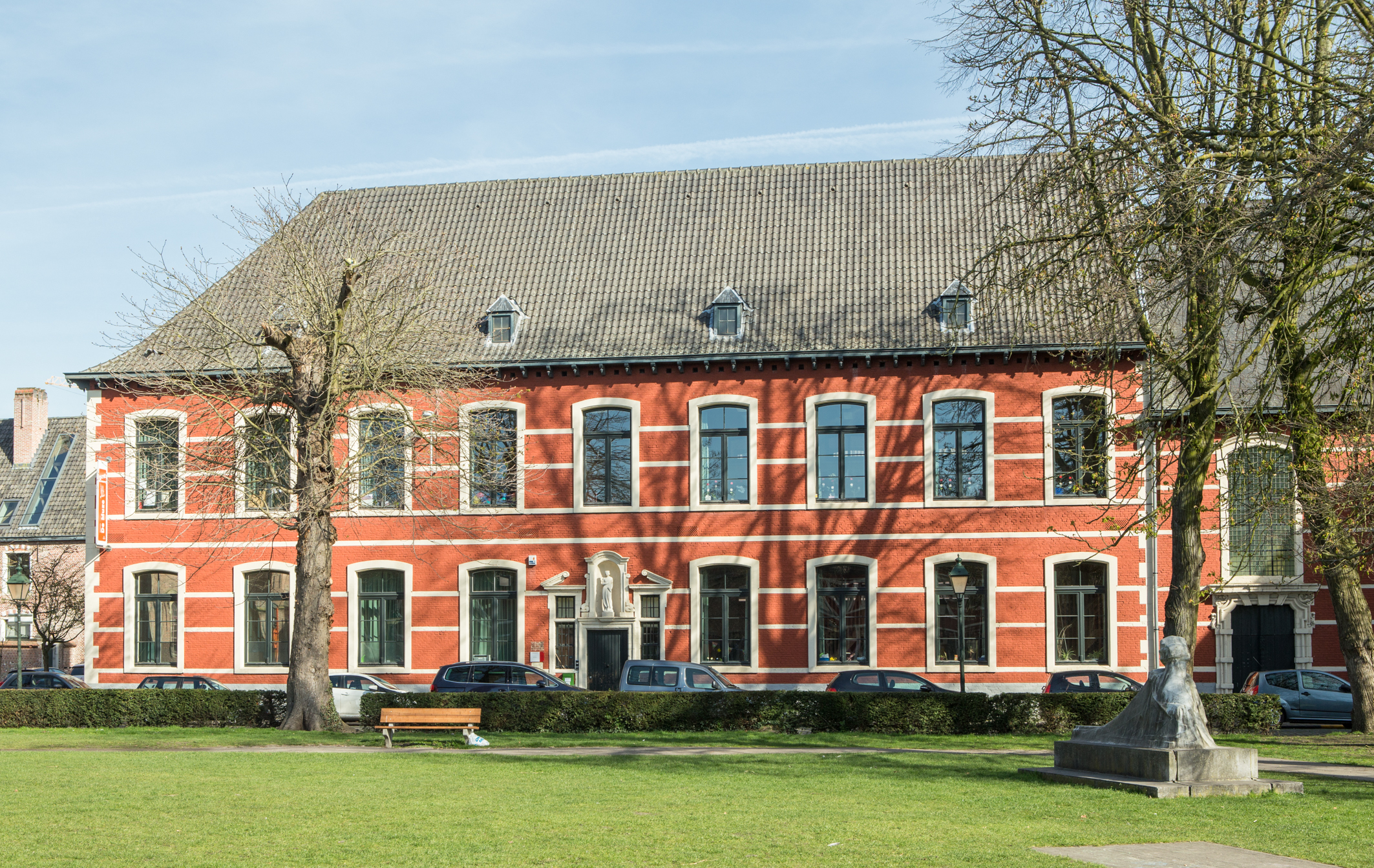
"Groothuis" and "Infirmerie" of the former St. Elizabeth Beguinage, now De Muze basisschool

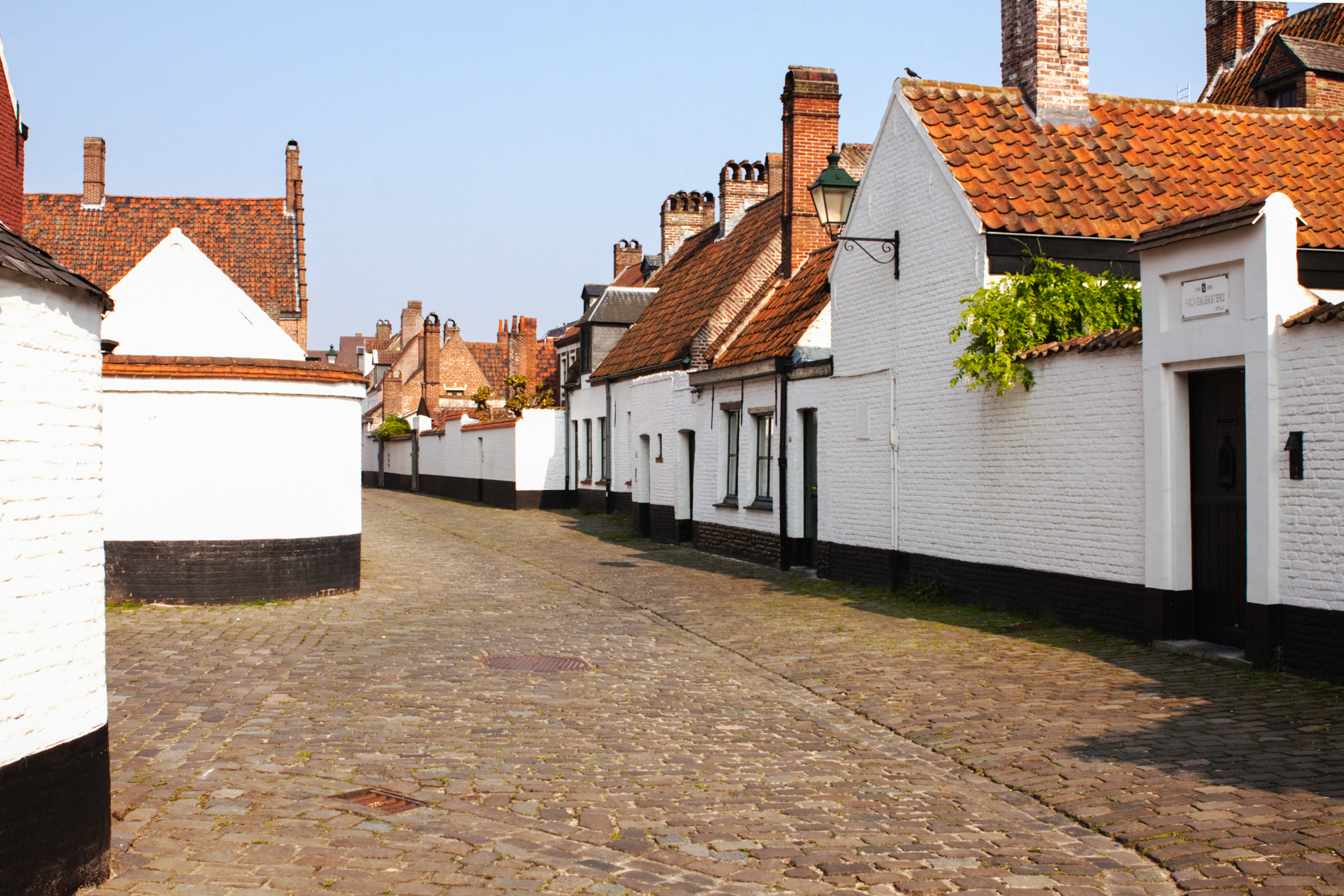
Provenierstersstraat

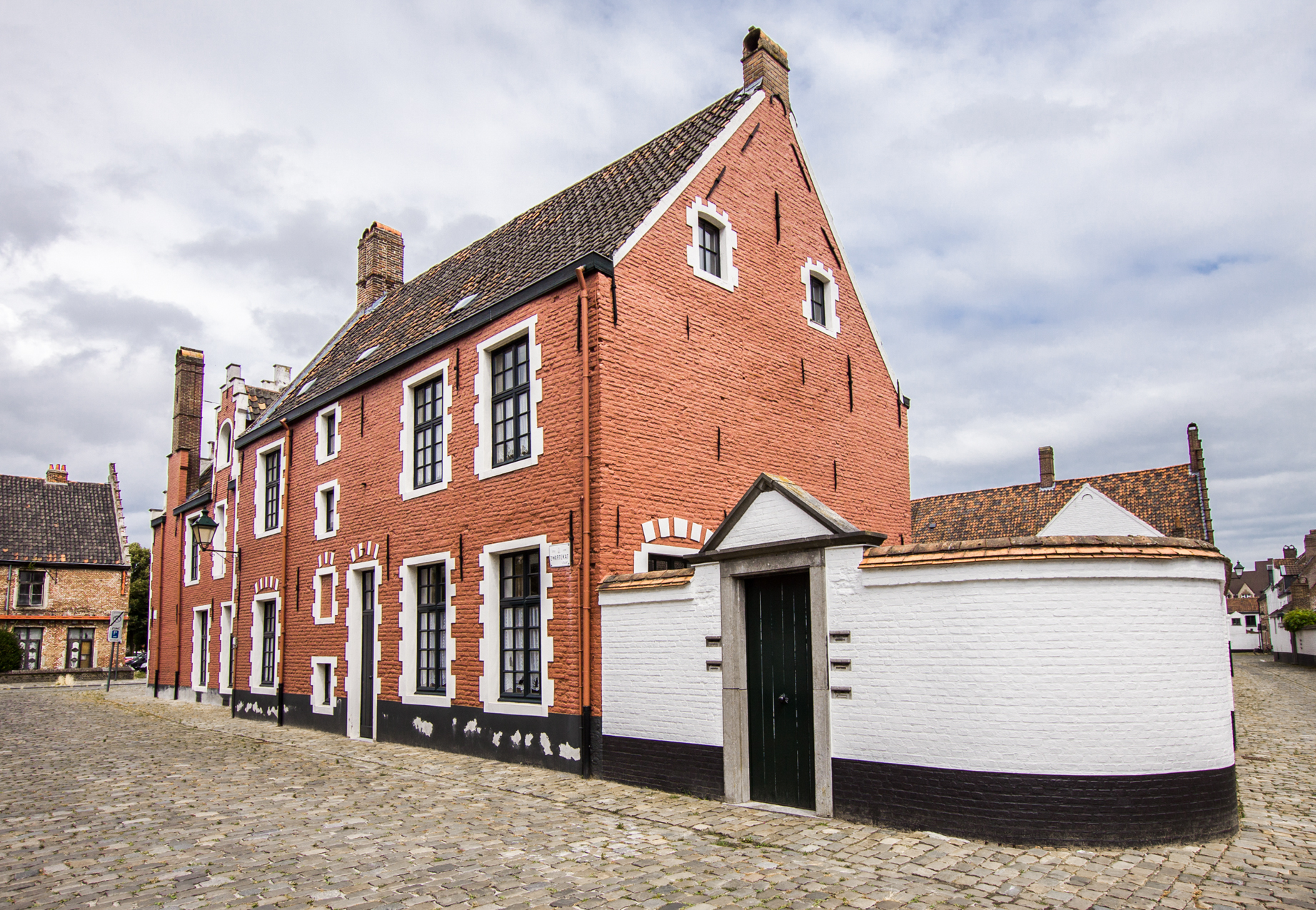
Zwartekatstraat

== Holy Corner ==
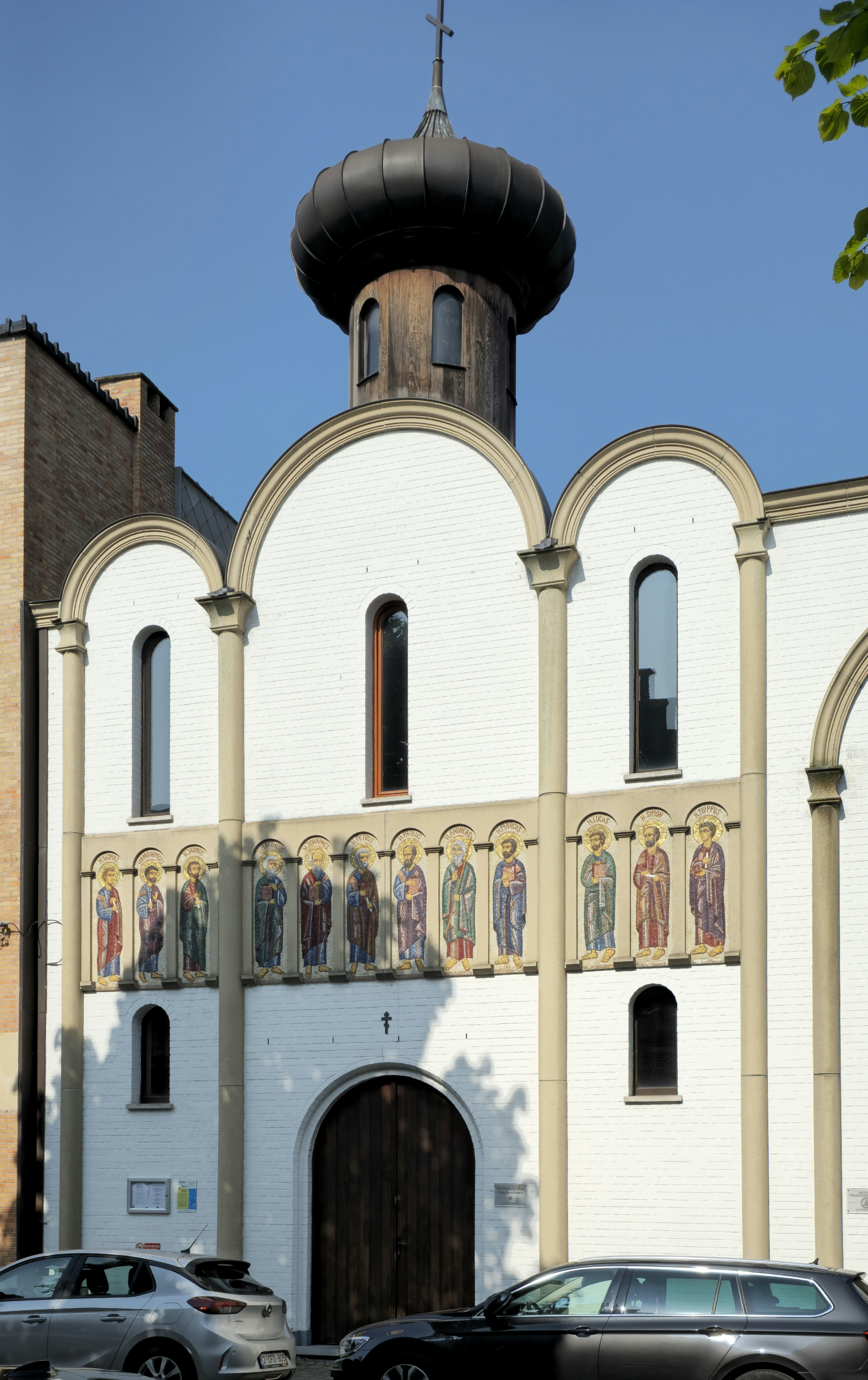
Orthodox Church of St. Andrew in the Van Akenstraat

In English, the neighbourhood is commonly known as the "Holy Corner". The name was originally coined by the late local Church of England vicar, Cameron Walker, who was of Scottish descent, and who with this name may have hinted at Holy Corner in Edinburgh. At the time, the neighbourhood was the location of four churches of four different nominations: the Roman Catholic St. Elizabeth Church, which was originally the beguinage church, the Eastern Orthodox Church of St. Andrew, the Protestant Rabot Church and the St. John's Anglican Church. The four churches share an Ecumenical Whitsun walk. Though the area has been largely gentrified, on Sunday mornings, practically every European and African language can be heard in its streets, since many Russians, Greeks, Ukrainians, Romanians, Serbs, Ethiopians, etc. come to worship at the Orthodox church, the Anglican church attracts Africans (and some other Christian foreigners who do not understand Dutch, the vernacular of the other two churches in the neighbourhood) and the Protestant church has Dutch, Africans and some East Europeans among its worshippers. However, in the summer of 2008, the Anglican church moved to a chapel in the neighbouring Theresianenstraat, just outside the Holy Corner, to return in January 2016. At the end of 2015, to offset a big drop in attendance at Roman Catholic churches in Ghent, the Roman Catholic Bishop of Ghent had disaffected a number of Roman Catholic church buildings. The St. Elizabeth Church building was then taken over by the Anglican community, which had in the meantime outgrown its location in the Theresianenstraat. The first fully Anglican church service of the St. Elizabeth's Anglican Church (the parish of St. John's) took place on Sunday, 24 January 2016 (after an ecumenical one on 17 January).

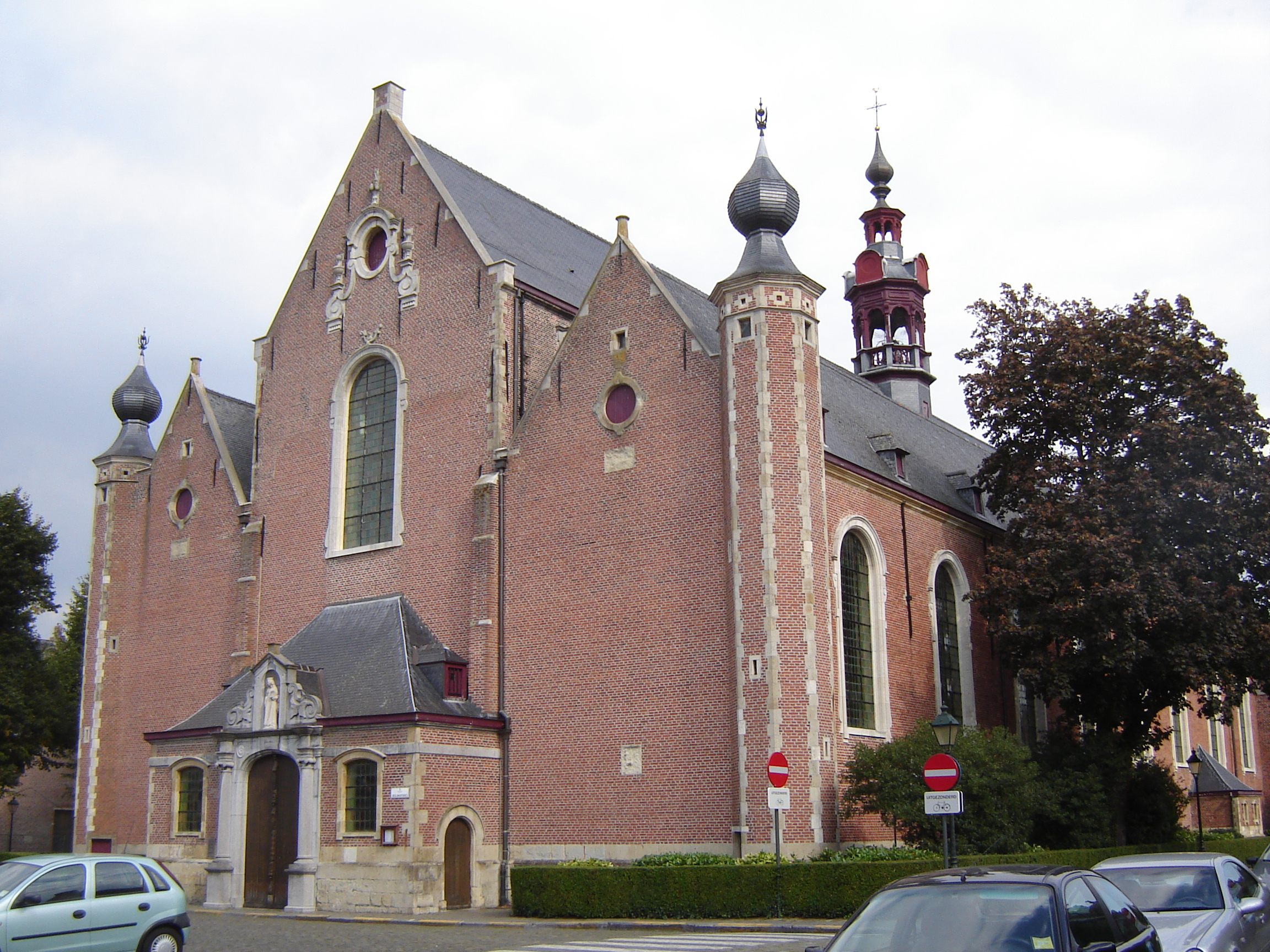
Anglican Church of St. Elizabeth (parish of St. John's)

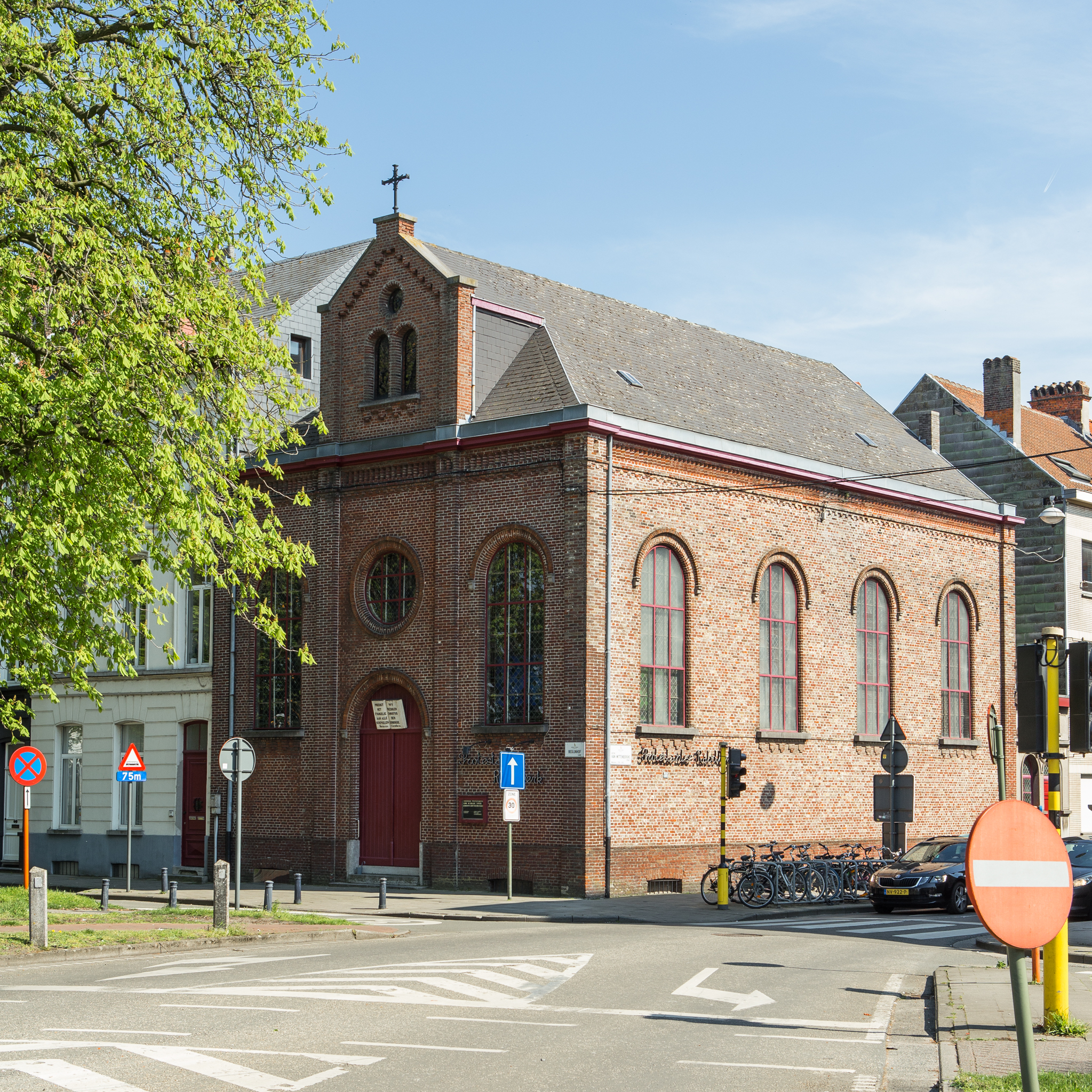
Protestant Rabot Church

== See also ==
- Holy Corner in Edinburgh
