= Anne van Doeveryn =

Dutch poet (1549–1625)

Anne van Doeveryn (1549–1625) was a Dutch-language poet.

== Life ==
Anne was born in Brussels in 1549, the daughter of Adolphe van Doeveryn. She made her profession in the Grand Beguinage of Leuven in 1575, where she worked as an embroiderer. In her free time she made artificial flowers to decorate the church, as well as reading vernacular translations of the Bible and the Church Fathers, and writing poetry. She studied Latin with the assistance of the chaplain of the beguinage, and translated St Ambrose's Life of St Agnes and the Sayings of St Bernard.

She died in the beguinage on 31 January 1625 and was buried in the church.
