= Beguinage =

Religious community, common in the Low Countries

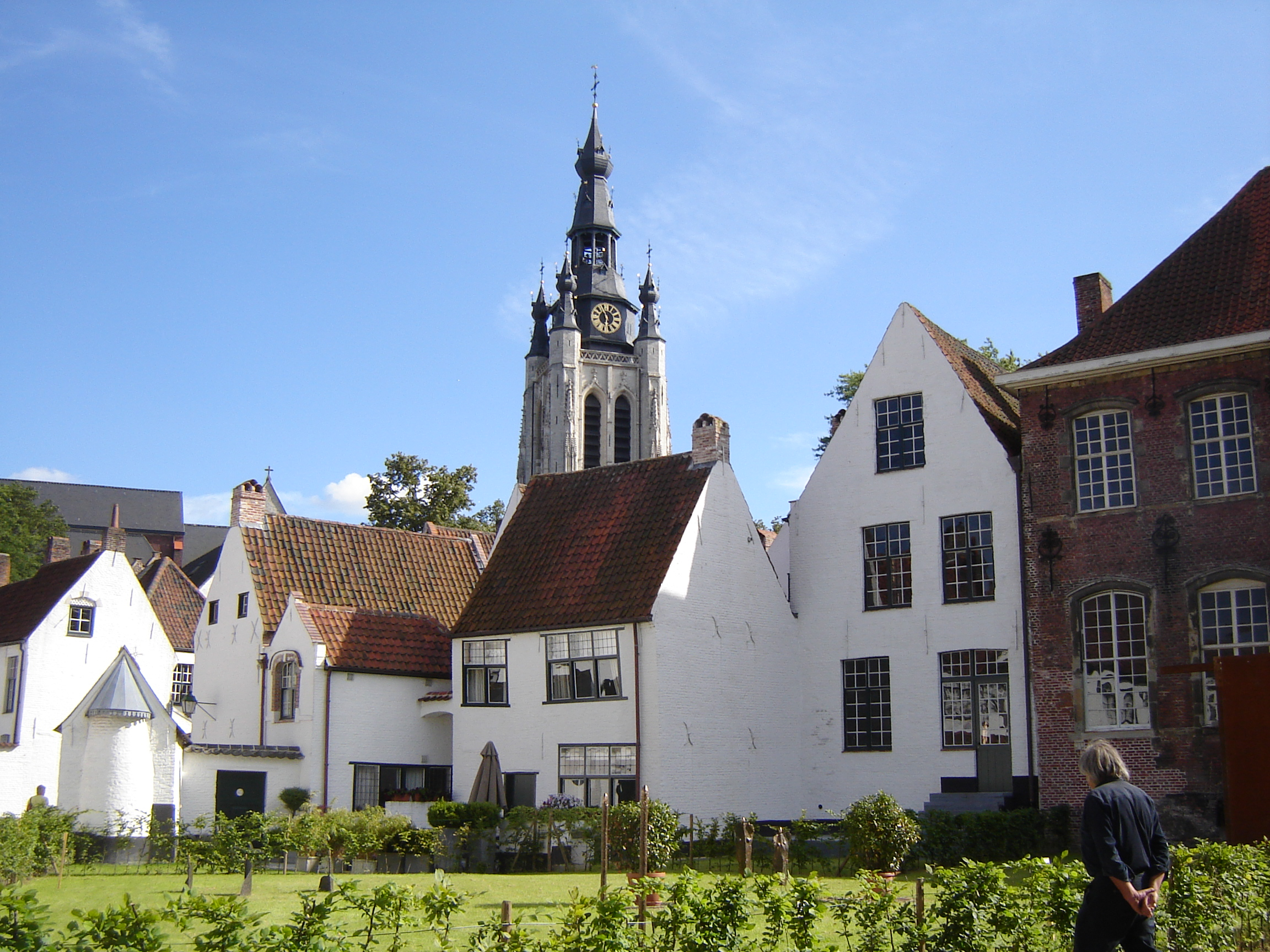
View of the St. Elizabeth Beguinage in Kortrijk

A beguinage, from the French term béguinage, is an architectural complex which was created to house beguines: lay religious women who lived in community without taking vows or retiring from the world.

Originally, the beguine institution was the convent, an association of beguines living together or in close proximity of each other under the guidance of a single superior, called a mistress or prioress. Although they were not usually referred to as "convents", in these houses dwelt a small number of women together: the houses small, informal, and often poor communities that emerged across Europe after the 12th century. In most cases, beguines who lived in a convent agreed to obey certain regulations during their stay and contributed to a collective fund.

In the first decades of the 13th century, much larger and more stable types of community emerged in the Low Countries: large court beguinages were formed which consisted of several houses for beguines built around a central chapel or church where their religious activities took place; these often included functional buildings such as a brewery, a bakery, a hospital, and some farm buildings. Several of these beguinages are now listed by UNESCO as World Heritage sites. Around the mid-13th century, the French king Louis IX founded a beguinage in Paris, which was modeled on the court beguinages of the Low Countries.

== Etymology ==
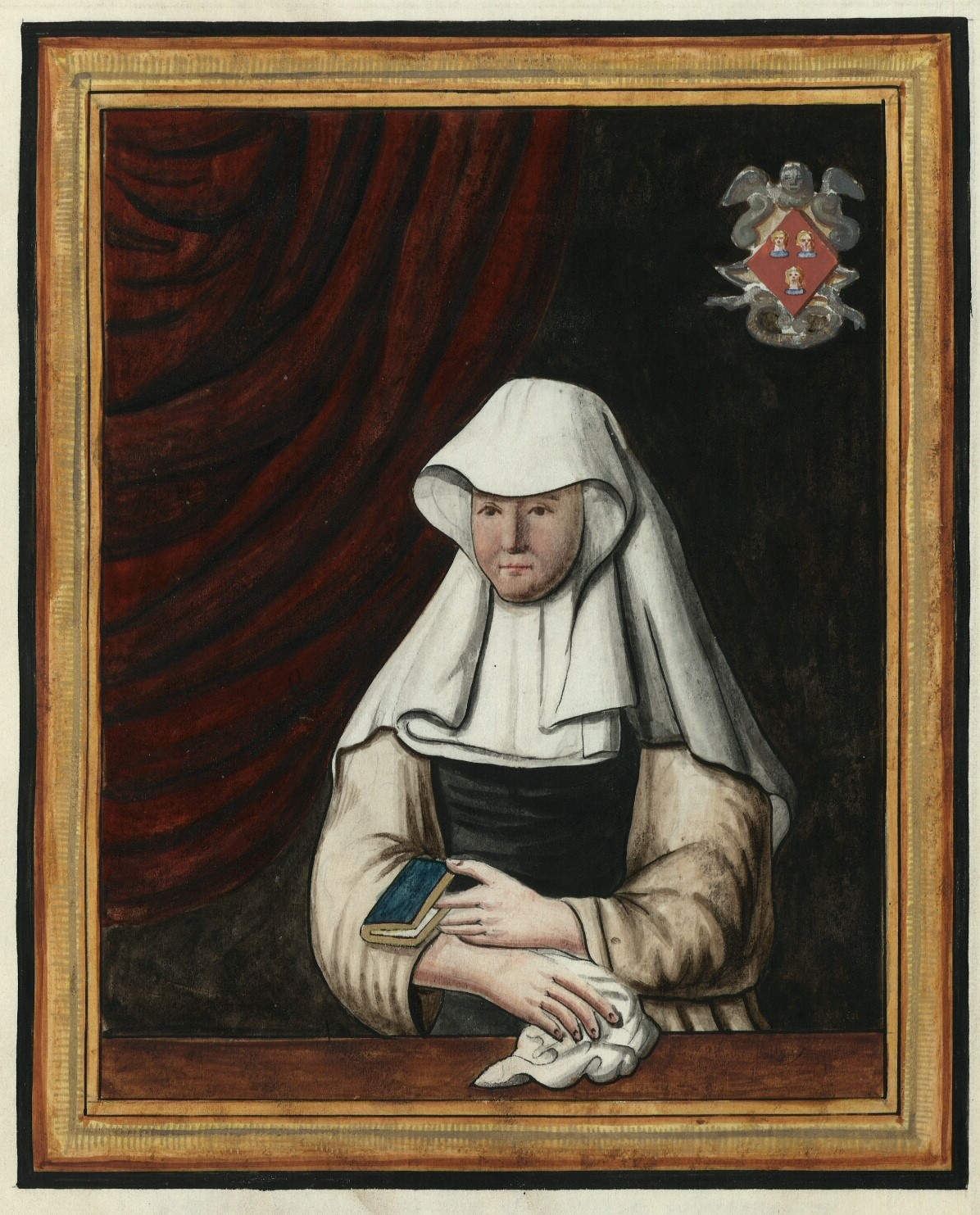
A beguine, inhabitant of a beguinage. Excerpt from a manuscript of the beguinage of Sint-Aubertus in Ghent. Made c. 1840.

The term "Beguine" (Latin: beguinas; Dutch: begijn) is of uncertain origin and may have been pejorative. Scholars no longer credit the theory expounded in the Encyclopædia Britannica Eleventh Edition (1911) that the name derived from Lambert le Bègue, a priest of Liège. Other theories, such as derivation from the name of St. Begga and from the purported, reconstructed Old Saxon word *beggen, "to beg" or "to pray", have also been discredited. The origin of the movement's name continues to be uncertain, as are the dates for the beginning of the movement itself.

== History and description ==
The beguinages began as part of a broader 12th–13th century religious movement in the Low Countries and the Rhineland. They emerged in response to a female demographic surplus, the financial inability of many women of modest origins to join traditional religious institutions or marry, and the rise of alternative religious vocations in a context of apostolic and mystical renewal. This climate promoted evangelical values such as the vita apostolica, poverty, humility, and itinerancy, giving rise to new religious movements, including the Franciscan, Dominican, and beguinal movements. The smaller and court beguinages answered such women's social and economic needs, offering them a religious life coupled with personal independence, which was difficult for women of the time to achieve.

While a small beguinage usually constituted just one house where women lived together, a Low Countries court beguinage typically comprised one or more courtyards surrounded by houses, and also included a church, an infirmary complex, and a number of communal houses or 'convents'. They were encircled by walls and separated from the town proper by several gates, closed at night, but through which during the day the beguines could come and go as they pleased. Beguines came from a wide range of social classes, though truly poor women were admitted only if they had a wealthy benefactor who pledged to provide for their needs.

Between the 12th and 18th centuries, every city and large town in the Low Countries had at least one court beguinage. In the Middle Ages, tensions arose between certain beguinages and ecclesiastical authorities over autonomy. The 15th–16th centuries brought further institutional changes. Following the spiritual crisis of the late Middle Ages and the Wars of Religion, the clergy increasingly supervised religious life, and beguinages became a testing ground for Counter-Reformation practices. Regulations and statutes were reinforced, dress codes and household organisation more strictly governed, and religious and spiritual life closely monitored. In the 17th–18th centuries, large urban beguinages flourished, whereas smaller, mostly rural communities were transformed into hospices for poor and elderly women. The communities dwindled and came to an end over the course of the 19th and 20th centuries.

== In Belgium ==
Flemish Béguinages
UNESCO World Heritage Site
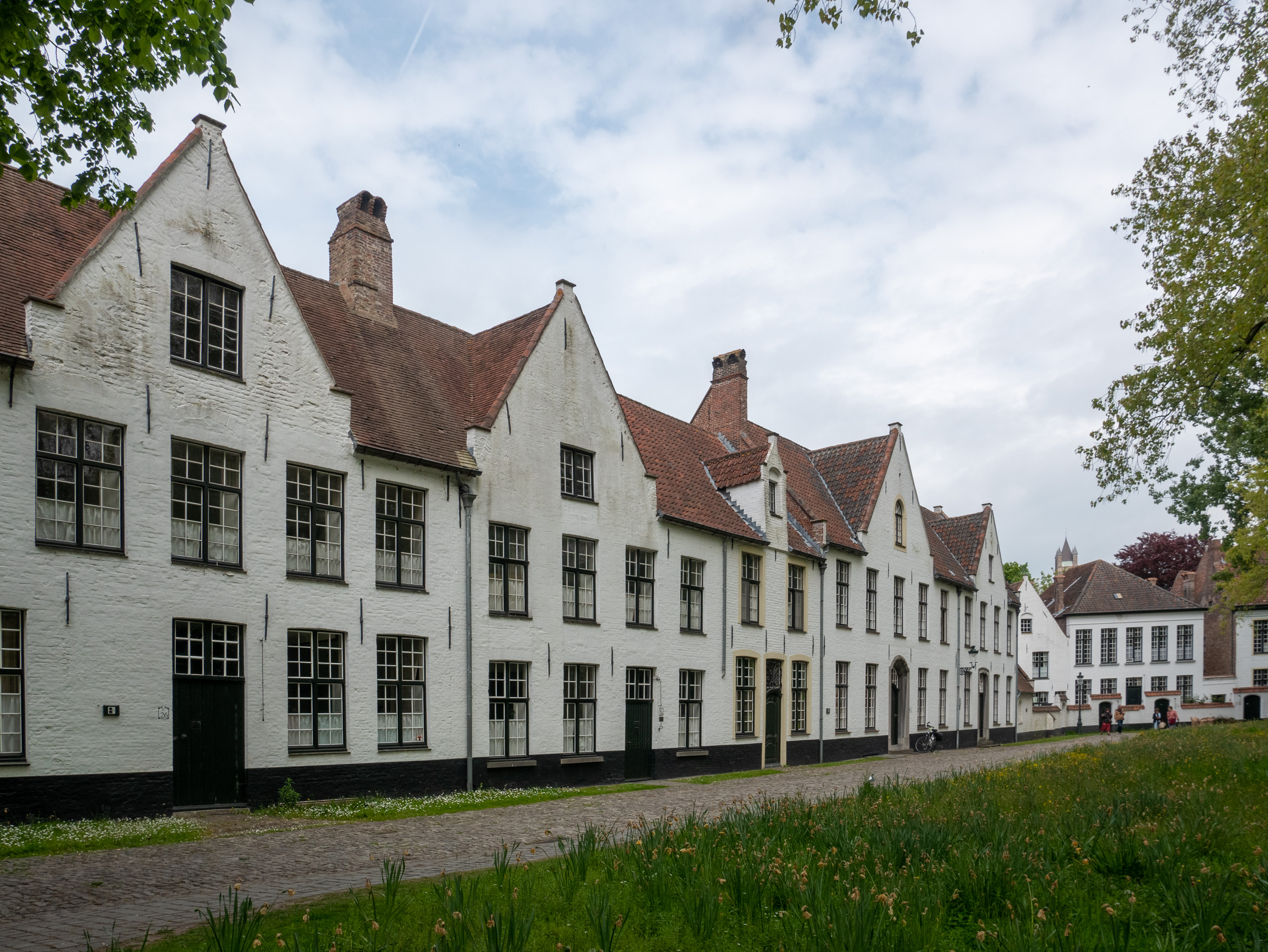
- Princely Beguinage Ten Wijngaerde, Bruges

- Location within Belgium
- Location: Flanders, Belgium
- Includes: 1. Beguinage of Hoogstraten; 2. Beguinage of Lier; 3. Large Beguinage of Mechelen; 4. Beguinage of Turnhout; 5. Beguinage of Sint-Truiden; 6. Beguinage of Tongeren; 7. Beguinage of Dendermonde; 8. Small Beguinage of Ghent; 9. Beguinage of Sint-Amandsberg / Ghent; 10. Beguinage of Diest; 11. Large Beguinage of Leuven; 12. Beguinage of Bruges; 13. Beguinage of Kortrijk
- Criteria: Cultural: (ii)(iii)(iv)
- Reference: 855
- Inscription: 1998 (22nd Session)
- Area: 59.95 ha (148.1 acres)
- Coordinates: 51°1′51.5″N 4°28′25.5″E

- Aarschot
- Anderlecht
- Antwerp
- Bruges‡
- Brussels
- Dendermonde‡
- Diest‡
- Diksmuide
- Ghent:
  - Old St. Elizabeth
  - New St. Elizabeth in Sint-Amandsberg‡
  - Our-Lady Ter Hooyen‡
- Hasselt
- Herentals
- Hoogstraten‡
- Lier‡
- Leuven:
  - Large‡
  - Small
- Mechelen:
  - Large‡
  - Small
- Kortrijk‡
- Oudenaarde
- Sint-Truiden‡
- Turnhout‡
- Tongeren‡

‡ marks the thirteen "Flemish Béguinages" listed by UNESCO as World Heritage Sites in 1998.

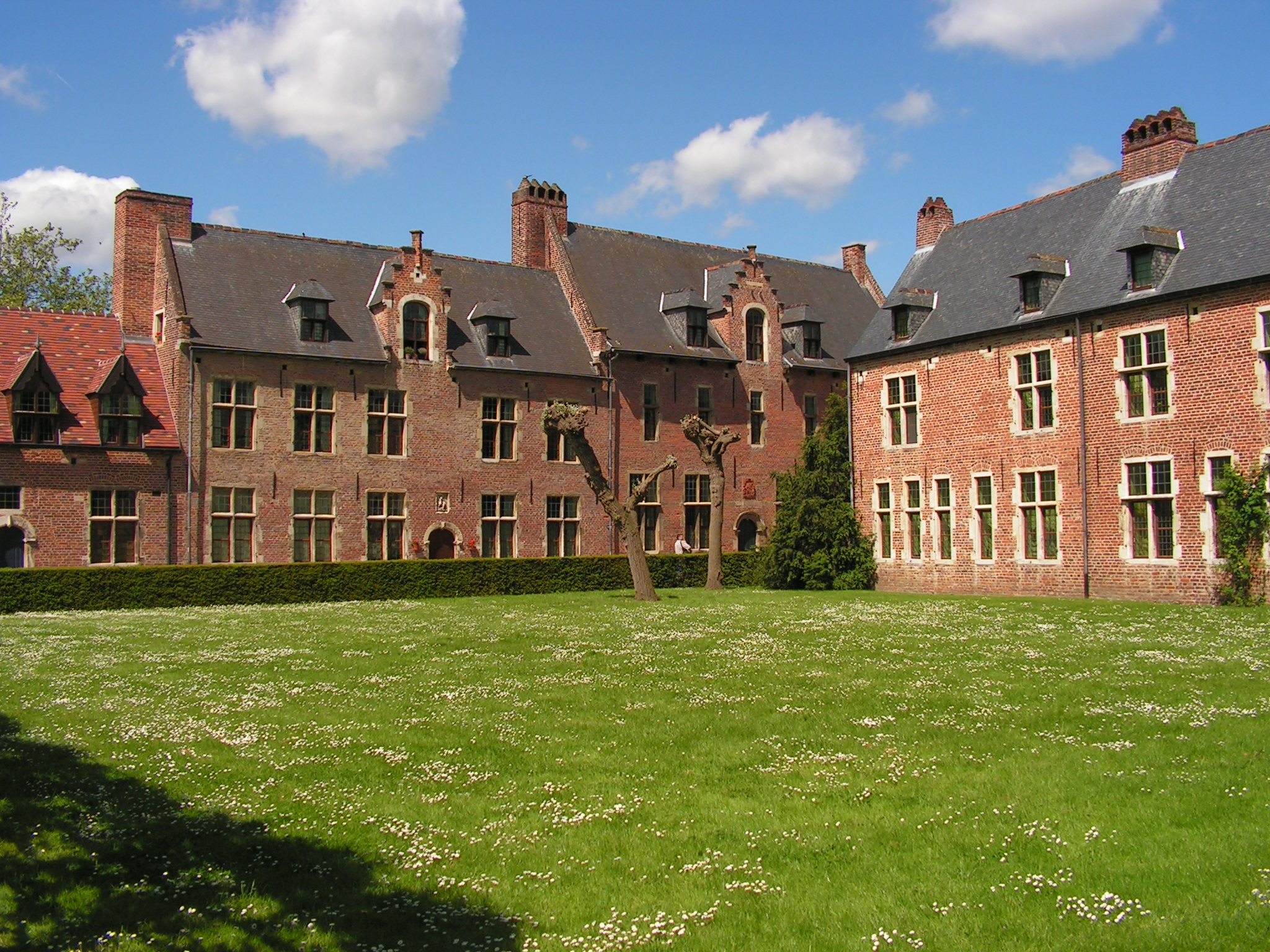
View of the Great Beguinage in Leuven

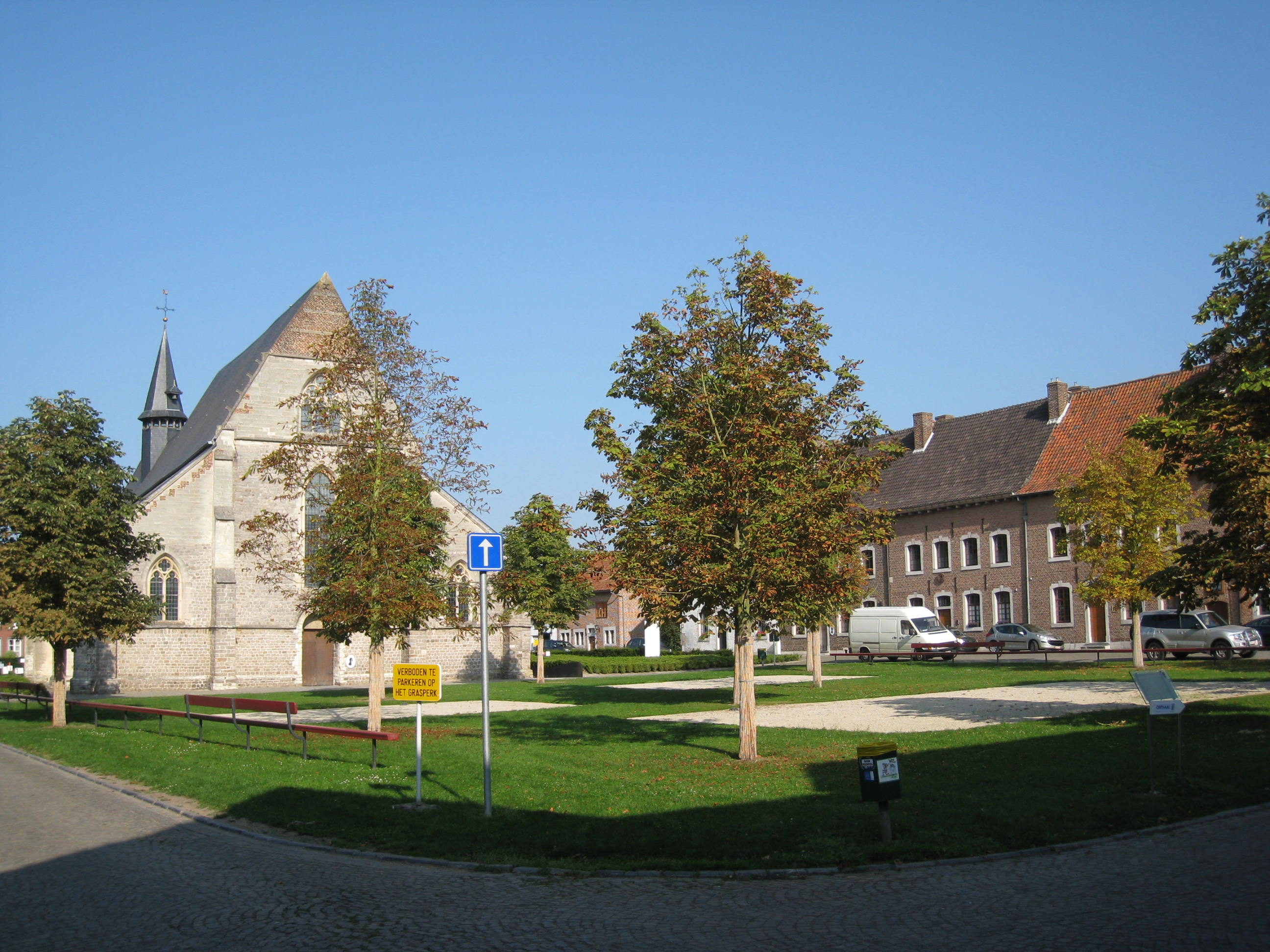
Beguinage in Sint-Truiden with its chapel (left)

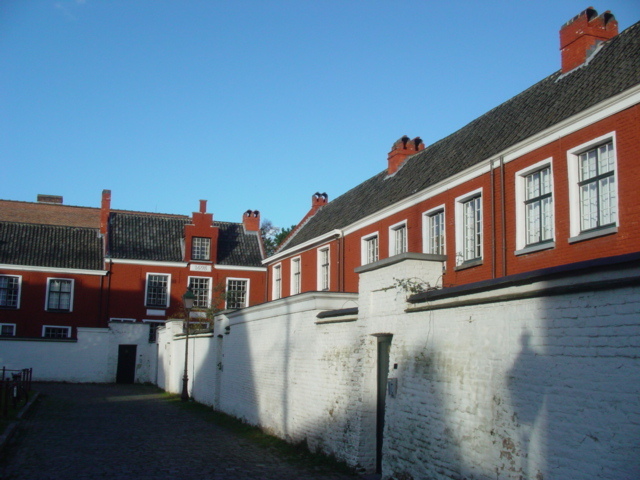
Our-Lady Ter Hooyen, Small Beguinage of Ghent

== Other beguinages ==
- Begijnhof, Amsterdam, Netherlands
- Bagijnhof Delft, Netherlands
- Begijnhof, Utrecht, Netherlands
- Breda, Netherlands
- Leeuwarden, Netherlands
- Haarlem, Netherlands
- Sittard, Netherlands
- Béguinage de la rue Quentin-Barré, et al., Saint-Quentin, France
- Béguinage de Saint Vaast, Cambrai, France
- Béguinage, Valenciennes
- Béguinage, Paris, France

== See also ==
- Beguines and Beghards
- Frauenfrage, specifically associated with a medieval demographic period, in relation to women

== Sources ==
- Miller, Tanya Stabler (2014). Beguines of Medieval Paris: Gender, Patronage, and Spiritual Authority. Pennsylvania UP. ISBN 978-0812246070.
- Simons, Walter (2001). Cities of Ladies: Beguine Communities in the Medieval Low Countries, 1200–1565. Pennsylvania UP. ISBN 978-0812236040.
- "World Heritage List | Flemish Béguinages". UNESCO. 1998.
