= Princely Beguinage Ten Wijngaerde, Bruges =

Beguinage in Bruges, Belgium

Beguinage of Bruges
UNESCO World Heritage Site
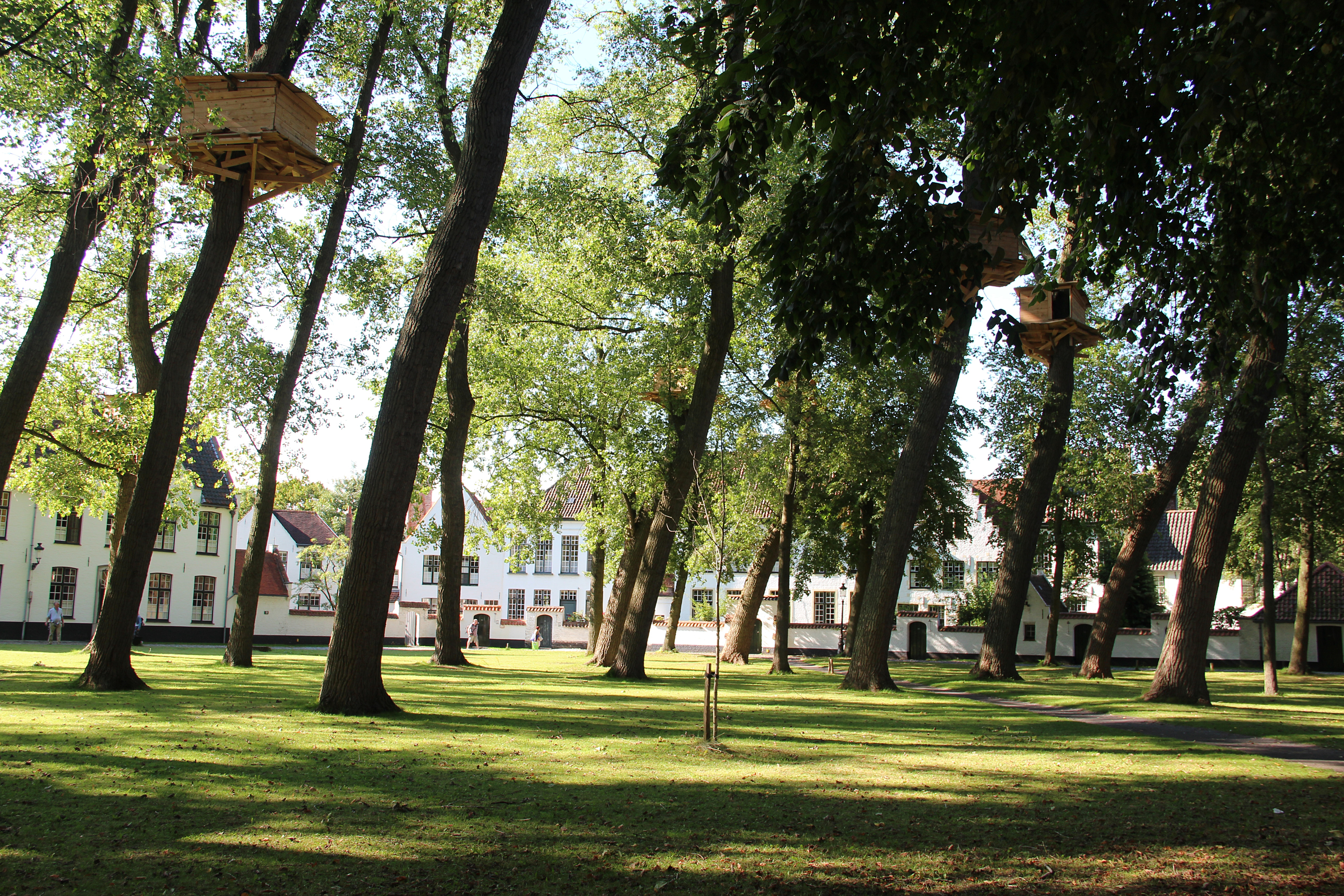

- Location within Belgium
- Location: Bruges, West Flanders, Belgium
- Part of: Flemish Béguinages
- Criteria: Cultural: (ii), (iii), (iv)
- Reference: 855-012
- Inscription: 1998 (22nd Session)
- Area: 0.55 ha (1.4 acres)
- Coordinates: 51°12′4.4″N 3°13′21.2″E

The Princely Beguinage Ten Wijngaerde (Dutch: Prinselijk Begijnhof Ten Wijngaerde) is the only preserved beguinage in Bruges, Belgium. There are no more beguines living there, but since 1927, it has functioned as a convent for Benedictines, founded by canon Hoornaert. In the same year, the houses at the west side were also reshaped and enlarged into the Monasterium De Wijngaard, a priory of Benedictine nuns.

== History ==
Already before 1240, a community of pious women settled at the domain 'de Wingarde' (old Dutch for vineyard), in the south of the city. This name probably refers to low-lying meadows. The beguinage was founded around 1244 by Margaret of Constantinople, after she requested permission to Walter van Marvis, bishop of Tournai, to move over the tomb chapel on the Burg of Bruges to the Wijngaard. In 1245, it was recognised as an independent parish. In 1299, it came under direct authority of King Philip the Fair and it was entitled as "Princely Beguinage".

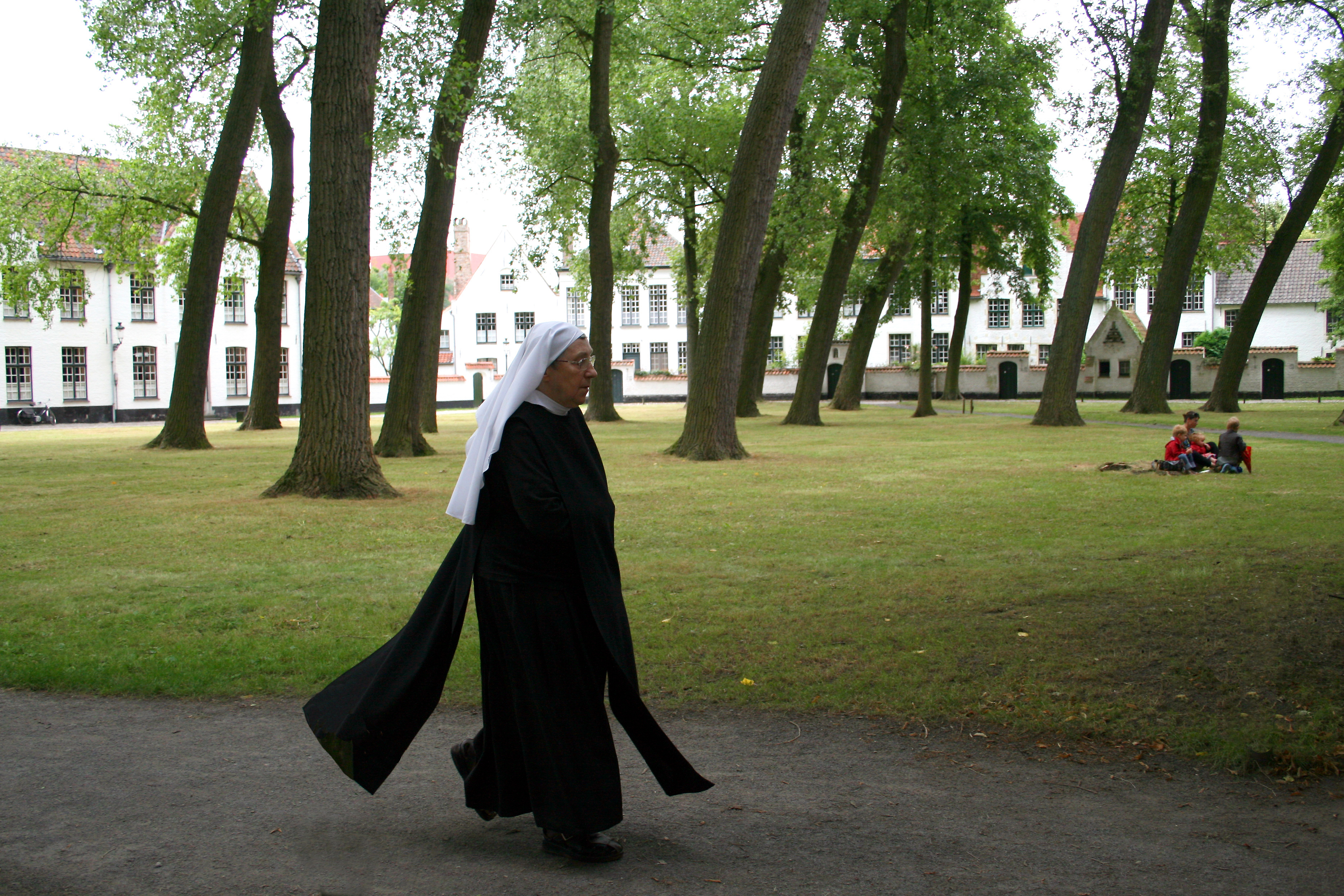
Benedictine nun

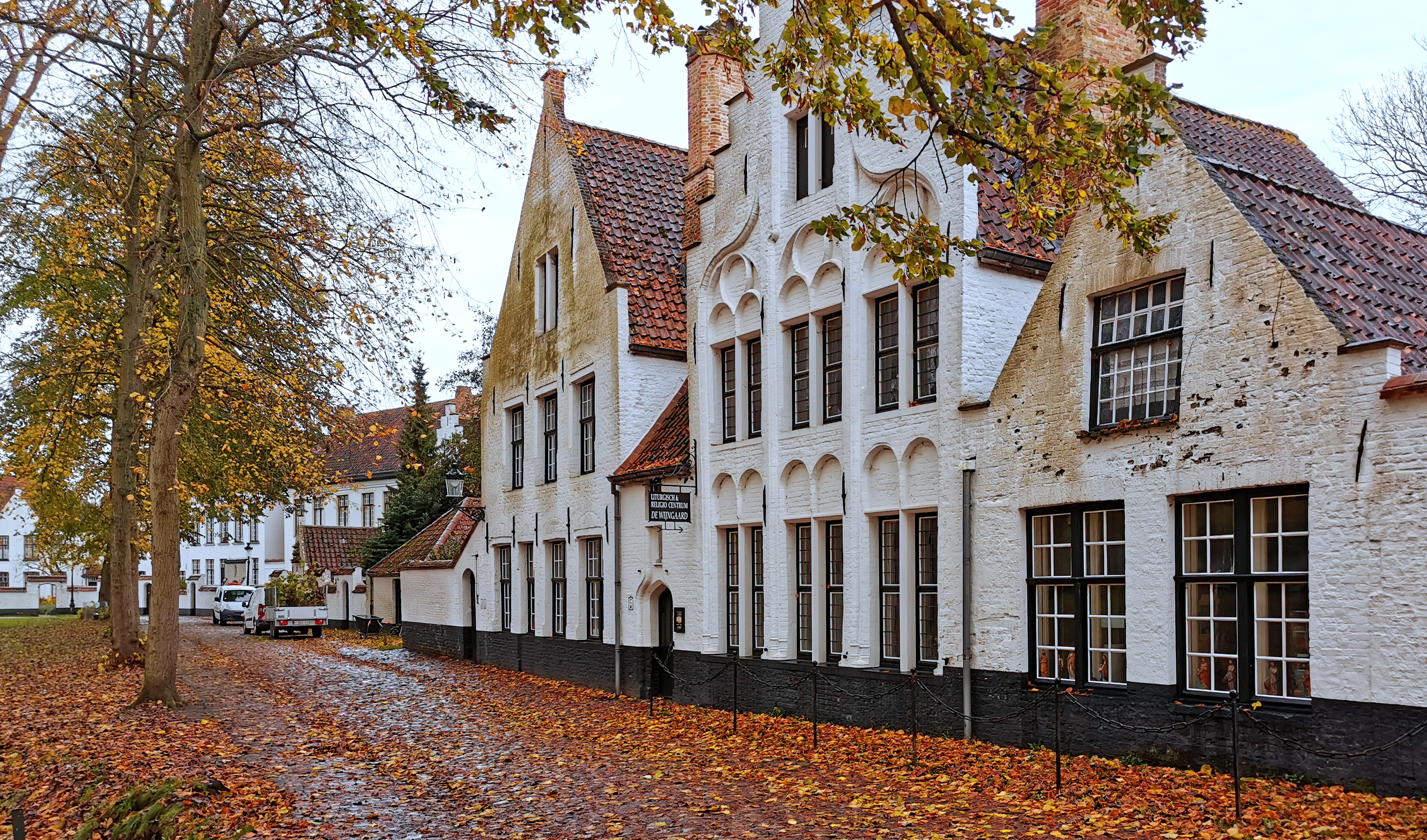

The complex includes a Gothic beguinage church and about thirty white painted houses dating from the late 16th, 17th and 18th centuries. Practically all of these are built around a central yard. The main entrance with gate can be reached via the three-arched stone bridge, the Wijngaard Bridge. In a bay, the image of the holy Elizabeth of Hungary, who was the patron of many beguinages, can be seen. De Wijngaard is also devoted to Saint Alexius. The entrance gate was built in 1776 by master mason Hendrik Bultynck. The first beguine house next to the entrance is furnished as a museum and the exhibition includes paintings, 17th- and 18th-century furniture and lacework, among others. A second gate gives access to the Sas House, via the Sas Bridge.

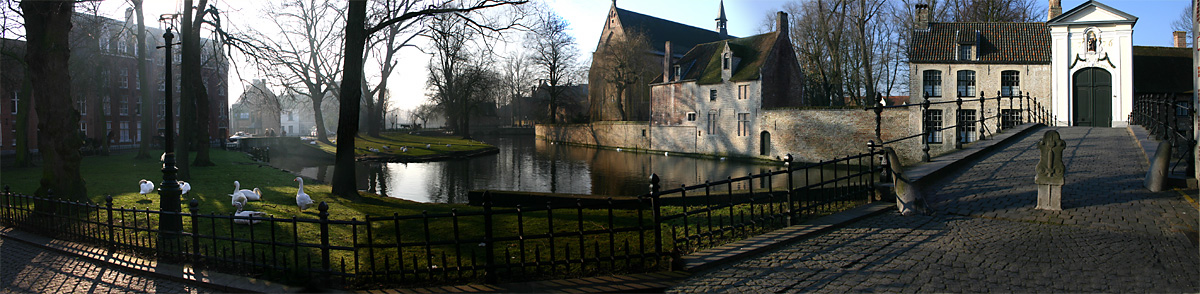
Panoramic view over the outside of the beguinage in the twilight; on the foreground the Wijngaard square with its swans and geese can be seen, and in the far distance the Minnewaterpark

== Bibliography ==
- (in French) Hoornaert H. (1921) Ce que c'est qu'un beguinage..., Desclée de Brouwer, Bruges.
- (in French) Hoornaert R. (1930) Le Beguinage de Bruges,son histoire, sa règle, sa vie, Desclée de Brouwer, Bruges.
- (in Dutch) Beernaert B. et al. (1993) Begijnhofkerk H. Elisabeth, in: 17de-eeuwse architectuur in de binnenstad, Open Monumentendag 1993, Bruges.
- (in Dutch) Van den Abeele A. (1998) Tuinen en verborgen hoekjes in Brugge, Brugge - Luik.
- (in Dutch) Beernaert B. (2002) Begijnhof, tuin van het monasterium, in: Een tuin is meer dan er staat, Open Monumentendagen Brugge, Bruges.
- (in Dutch) Dhondt R. (2008) Gravin Johanna van Constantinopel en het Brugs Begijnhof, in: Brugs Ommeland, pp. 228–237.
- (in Dutch) Dhondt R. (2009) Problemen bij het omvormen van het Brugse begijnhof tot een parochie, in: Brugs Ommeland, pp. 51–59.
- (in Dutch) Dhondt R. (2011) Wie woonde er voor 1300 op het Begijnhof te Brugge?, in: Brugs Ommeland, pp. 14–29.
- (in Dutch) Van den Broecke E., Uyttenhove L. (2013) Laus Deo. Rodolphe Hoornaert en zijn werk, 1886-1969, Bruges-Leuven.
