= Our-Lady Ter Hooyen =

Beguinage in Ghent, Belgium

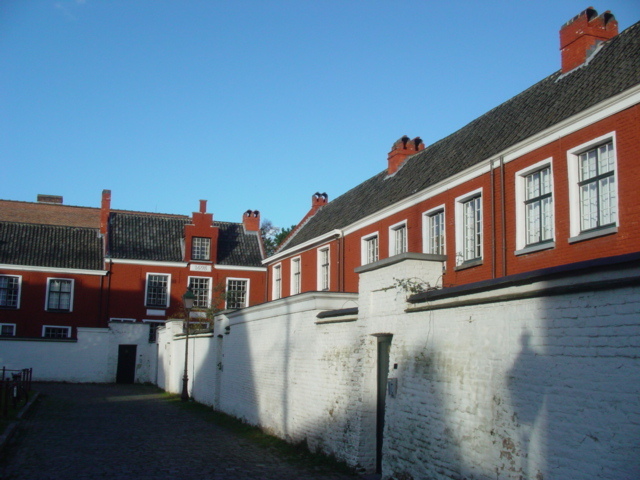
Beguinage O.L.V. Ter Hooyen

The small beguinage of Our-Lady Ter Hooyen is situated in southern area of Ghent, Belgium. This beguinage was built on the 'Groene Hooie', between the 'Hooipoort' and the 'Vijfwindgatenpoort'. That is how this little beguinage got its name.

== The history of the small beguinage O.L.V. Ter Hooyen in Ghent ==
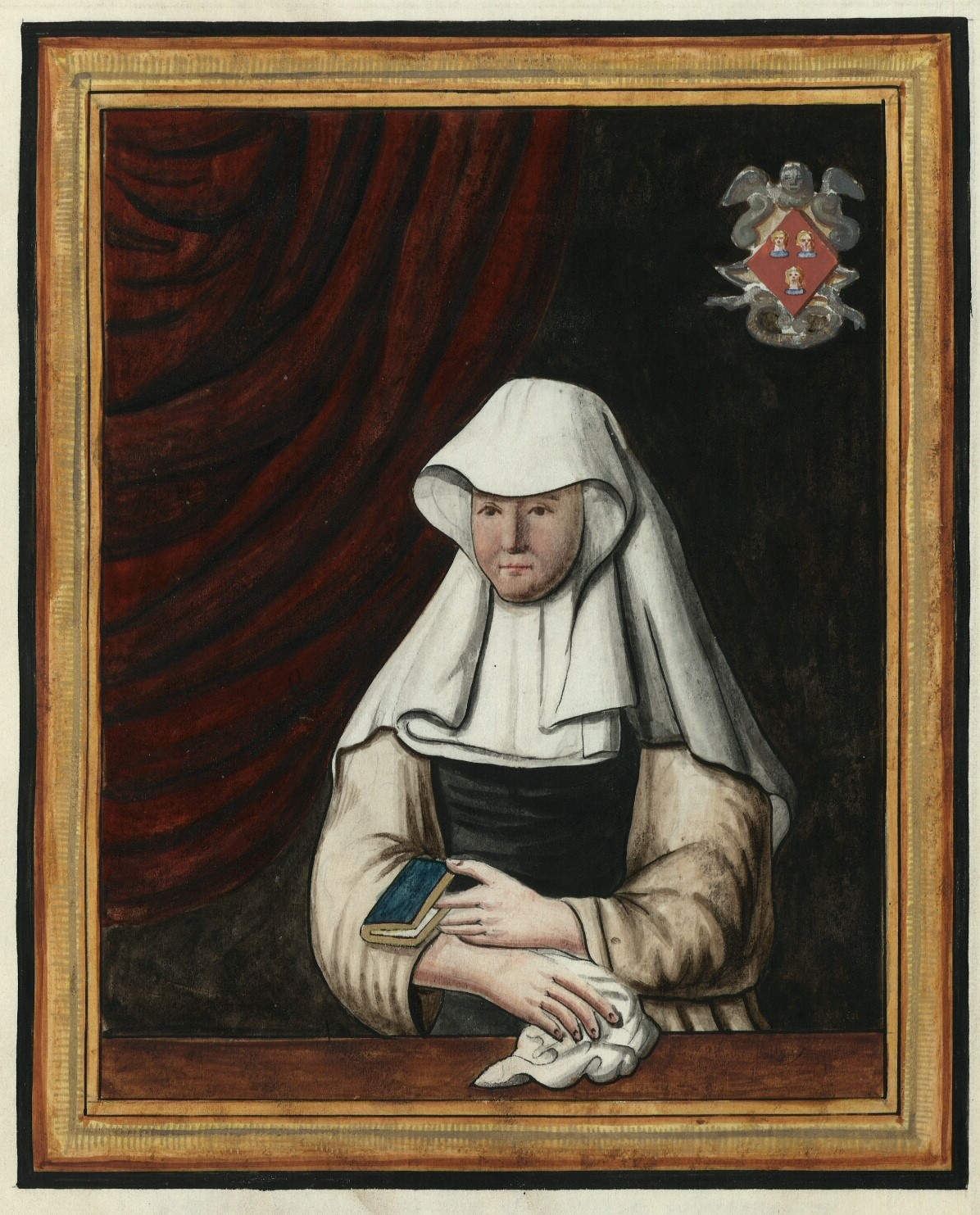
Beguine of Ghent. Excerpt from a manuscript of the beguinage of Sint-Aubertus, Ghent, ca. 1840.

In Western Europe the era of the beguinages started in the 12th century. In Ghent they started building 2 beguinages in 1234. They were founded by the countesses Johanna and Margaretha of Flanders. A large part of the beguinage leaned against the city wall. It gave shelter to the beguines coming from small nobility and the newly formed middle class.

The beguinage as it is now dates mostly of the 17th and 18th century. In the 19th and 20th centuries it was partly restored, but the restorations are hardly noticeable. With the French occupation of Belgium the beguinage with all it possessions became property of the Commissie der Burgerlijke Godshuizen van de Stad Gent. And in 1801 it was a legitimately acknowledged religious community. In the year 1862 the Duke of Arenberg bought the entire beguinage from the Commission.

After World War I the duke had to relinquish his rights because he was a German citizen. In 1925, the newly founded non-profit organisation Begijnhof O.L.V. Ter Hoyen bought the entire beguinage complex. The beguinage became a protected monument on October 30, 1963.

== The architecture of the beguinage ==
The gate is neoclassical and dates from 1819. It is the only point of entrance and exit. All the buildings are situated within the walls of the beguinage. The lawn in the courtyard is surrounded by lime trees and beech trees. The surrounding buildings have white walls and green little gates.

The church is a dedicated to our Lady. It was built between 1654-1658 and in 1716 it was given a baroque façade. The image of the horsemen refers to the Apocalypse and is situated against the south wall. The seven stations of the circumambulation in honour of our Lady of the Seven Sorrows testify to the devotion of the citizens. The building where the Mistress of the beguines and her staff lived is situated in the northern corner of the beguinage. There you also find the farm and the hospital with the chapel dedicated to Saint Godelieve. Around the beguinage pasture and the ‘Achterstraat’ are about 100 houses and 7 convents, all of which bear the name of a saint.

Most of the houses have a little front yard, enclosed by a high wall and a gate with a peephole. All the houses have one storey and an attic, some of them also have a basement and a little back yard.
