= Malleus Maleficarum =

Treatise on the prosecution of witches, 1486

- Hammer of Witches
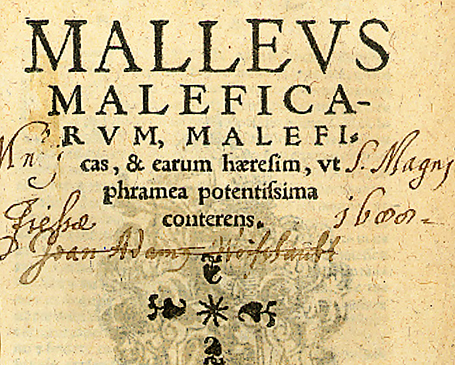
- Title page of the seventh Cologne edition of the Malleus Maleficarum, 1520 (from the University of Sydney Library)
- Full title: Malleus Maleficarum
- Also known as: Hammer of Witches
- Author(s): Heinrich Kramer
- Language: Latin
- Date: 1486
- Date of issue: 1487

The Malleus Maleficarum, (Note: Translator Montague Summers consistently uses "the Malleus Maleficarum" (or simply "the Malleus") in his 1928 and 1948 introductions.) usually translated as the Hammer of Witches, (Note: Compare English "mallet" and English "malevolence". Alternative translations include The Witch Hammer, Hammer for Sorceresses, Hammer Against Witches, Hammer for Witches.) is the best known treatise about witchcraft. It was written by German Catholic clergyman Heinrich Kramer (under his Latinized name Henricus Institor) and first published in the German city of Speyer in 1486. Some characterize the book as a compendium of preexisting demonological literature of the 15th century, as opposed to an original work.

In 1484, two years before the work’s publication, Pope Innocent VIII authorised Kramer to investigate alleged witchcraft in the papal bull Summis desiderantes affectibus. Kramer presented his text as an official position of the Catholic Church. The book was condemned by top theologians of the Inquisition at the Faculty of Cologne for recommending illegal procedures and for inconsistencies with existing Catholic demonological doctrines. Kramer was not disciplined by the Church and even enjoyed considerable prestige thereafter.

The Malleus classifies sorcery as heresy, a severe crime at the time, and recommends that secular courts prosecute it accordingly. The Malleus suggests torture to get confessions and death as the only certain way to end the "evils of witchcraft". When it was published, heretics were often sentenced to be burned alive at the stake, and the Malleus suggested the same for "witches". Despite its condemnation by some members of the church, the Malleus was very popular.

Jacob Sprenger was credited as a coauthor from 1519 onward, although his role in the text and authorial relationship with Kramer is subject to debate.

The book was later revived by royal courts during the Renaissance, which contributed to the increasingly brutal prosecution of witchcraft during the 16th and 17th centuries.

== Background ==
Witchcraft had long been forbidden by the Church, whose viewpoint on the subject was explained in the Canon Episcopi. Written in about AD 900, this described witchcraft and magic as delusions and that those who believed in such things "had been seduced by the Devil in dreams and visions". However, in the same period supernatural intervention was accepted in European Christian culture in the form of ordeals later used during witch trials.

It is an element of Christian doctrine that demons may be cast out by appropriate sacramental exorcisms. (Note: not a sacrament, but sacramental) For example, the Malleus lists exorcism as one of the five ways to overcome the attacks of incubi. Prayer and transubstantiation are traditionally not considered magical rites.

In 1484 clergyman Heinrich Kramer made one of the first attempts at prosecuting alleged witches in the Tyrol region. It was not a success: he was expelled from the city of Innsbruck and dismissed by the local bishop as "senile and crazy". According to Diarmaid MacCulloch, writing the book was Kramer's act of self-justification and revenge. Ankarloo and Clark claim that Kramer's purpose in writing the book was to explain his own views on witchcraft, systematically refute arguments claiming that witchcraft did not exist, discredit those who expressed skepticism about its reality, claim that those who practised witchcraft were more often women than men, and to convince magistrates to use Kramer's recommended procedures for finding and convicting witches.

Some scholars have suggested that following the failed efforts in Tyrol, Kramer requested explicit authority from the Pope to prosecute witchcraft. Kramer received a papal bull Summis desiderantes affectibus in 1484. It gave full papal approval for the Inquisition to prosecute what was deemed to be witchcraft in general and also gave individual authorizations to Kramer and Dominican Friar Jacob Sprenger specifically. Other scholars have disputed the idea that Sprenger was working with Kramer, arguing that the evidence shows that Sprenger was actually a persistent opponent of Kramer, even going so far as to ban him from Dominican convents within Sprenger's jurisdiction while also banning him from preaching. In the words of Wolfgang Behringer:

Sprenger had tried to suppress Kramer's activities in every possible way. He forbade the convents of his province to host him, he forbade Kramer to preach, and even tried to interfere directly in the affairs of Kramer's Séléstat convent... The same day Sprenger became successor to Jacob Strubach as provincial superior (October 19, 1487), he obtained permission from his general, Joaquino Turriani, to lash out adversus m[agistrum] Henricum Institoris inquisitorem (English: against Master Heinrich Kramer, inquisitor).

The preface also includes an alleged unanimous approbation from the University of Cologne's Faculty of Theology. Nevertheless, many historians have argued that it is well established by sources outside the Malleus that the university's theology faculty condemned the book for unethical procedures and for contradicting Catholic theology on a number of important points: "just for good measure Institoris forged a document granting their apparently unanimous approbation."

The book became the handbook for secular courts throughout Renaissance Europe, but was not used by the Inquisition, which "denied any authority to the Malleus" in the words of historian Wolfgang Behringer.

In modern times, the book has often been viewed as a typical inquisitorial manual, a perception that many historians have refuted. According to Jenny Gibbons:

in the 1970s, when feminist and Neo-Pagan authors turned their attention to the witch trials, the Malleus Maleficarum (Hammer of Witches) was the only manual readily available in translation. Authors naively assumed that the book painted an accurate picture of how the Inquisition tried witches. Heinrich Kramer, the text's demented author, was held up as a typical inquisitor. His rather stunning sexual preoccupations were presented as the Church's "official" position on witchcraft. Actually the Inquisition immediately rejected the legal procedures Kramer recommended and censured the inquisitor himself just a few years after the Malleus was published. Secular courts, not inquisitorial ones, resorted to the Malleus.

Before 1400 it was rare for anyone to be prosecuted for witchcraft, but the increasingly common prosecution of heresy and failure to fully defeat these heretics paved the way for later criminal prosecution of witchcraft. By the 15th century belief in witches was widely accepted in European society. Previously, those convicted of witchcraft typically suffered penalties no more harsh than public penances such as a day in the stocks, but their prosecution became more brutal following the publication of the Malleus Maleficarum, as witchcraft became widely accepted as a real and dangerous phenomenon. The most severe prosecutions took place between the years 1560 and 1630, largely ending in Europe around 1780.

Particularly in the 16th and 17th centuries an intense debate on the nature of witches preoccupied demonologists across Europe and they published many printed sermons, books and tracts. The Catholic Church played an important role in shaping of debate on demonology, but the discourse was not much affected by the Reformation. Martin Luther was also convinced about the reality and evil of witches, and facilitated development of Protestant demonology.

Catholic and Protestant demonologies were similar in their basic beliefs about witches and most writers agreed on the severity of the crime of witchcraft. (Note: According to Summers, the Malleus "lay on the bench of every judge, on the desk of every magistrate".) It was accepted by both Catholic and Protestant legislatures and witch-hunting was undeniably sponsored by both Protestant and Catholic governments. (Note: Additional note: "Such thinking was also mirrored in the groundbreaking work of the German scholars Wilhelm Gottfried Soldan (1803-1869) and Joseph Hansen (1862-1943) both of whom blamed witchhunts on the overweening power of the Roman Catholic Church and saw the demise of witch trials as a natural corollary of the progress of reason and science.") (Note: Additional note: "But although Catholics have been fed comforting errors by overeager apologists about the Church's part in prosecuting witches, we must face our own tragic past. Fellow Catholics, to whom we are forever bound in the communion of saints, did sin grievously against people accused of witchcraft. If our historical memory can be truly purified, then the smoke from the Burning Times can finally disperse.") Witches became heretics to Christianity and witchcraft became the greatest of crimes and sins. Within continental and Roman Law witchcraft was the crimen exceptum, a crime so foul that all normal legal procedures were superseded.

During the Age of Enlightenment, belief in the powers of witches to harm began to die out in the West. For the post-Enlightenment Christians, the disbelief was based on a belief in rationalism and empiricism.

== Summary of contents ==
The Malleus Maleficarum consists of the following parts:

1. Justification (introduction, Latin Apologia auctoris)
2. Papal bull
3. Approbation by professors of theology at University of Cologne
4. Table of contents
5. Main text in three sections

=== Justification (Apologia auctoris) ===
In this part it is briefly explained that prevalence of sorcery which is a method of Satan's final assault motivated authors to write the Malleus Maleficarum:

[...] [ Lucifer ] attacks through these heresies at that time in particular, when the evening of the world declines towards its setting and the evil of men swells up, since he knows in great anger, as John bears witness in the Book of Apocalypse [12:12], that he has little time remaining. Hence, he has also caused a certain unusual heretical perversity to grow up in the land of the Lord – a Heresy, I say, of Sorceresses, since it is to be designated by the particular sex over which he is known to have power. [...] In the midst of these evils, we Inquisitors, Jacobus Sprenger together with the very dear associate [Institoris] delegated by the Apostolic See for the extermination of so destructive a heresy [...] we will bring everything to the desired conclusion. [...] naming the treatise the "Hammer for Sorceresses," we are undertaking the task of compiling the work for an associate [presumably, an ecclesiastic] [...]

=== Papal bull ===
Copies of the Malleus Maleficarum contain a reproduction of a papal bull known as Summis desiderantes affectibus that is addressed to Heinrich Institoris and Jakob Sprenger. According to it, Pope Innocent VIII acknowledges that sorceresses are real and harmful through their involvement in the acts of Satan.

According to the date on the document, the papal bull had been issued in 1484, two years before the Malleus Maleficarum was finished. Therefore, it is not an endorsement of a specific final text of the Malleus. Instead, its inclusion implicitly legitimizes the handbook by providing general confirmation of the reality of witchcraft and full authority to Sprenger and Institoris in their preachings and proceedings:

And they shall also have full and entire liberty to propound and preach to the faithful Word of God, as often as it shall seem to them fitting and proper, in each and all of the parish churches in the said provinces, and to do all things necessary and suitable under the aforesaid circumstances, and likewise freely and fully to carry them out.

— Summis desiderantes affectibus

=== Approbation ===
This part of the Malleus is titled "The Approbation of The Following Treatise and The Signatures Thereunto of The Doctors of The Illustrious University of Cologne Follows in The Form of A Public Document" and contains unanimous approval of the Malleus Maleficarum by all the Doctors of the Theological Faculty of the University of Cologne signed by them personally. The proceedings are attested by notary public Arnold Kolich of Euskirchen, a sworn cleric of Cologne with inclusion of confirmatory testimony by present witnesses Johannes Vorda of Mecheln a sworn beadle, Nicholas Cuper de Venrath the sworn notary of Curia of Cologne and Christian Wintzen of Euskirchen a cleric of the Diocese of Cologne.

Text of approbation mentions that during proceedings Institoris had a letter from Maximilian, the newly crowned King of the Romans and son of Emperor Frederick III, which is summarized in the approbation: "[... Maximilian I] takes these Inquisitors under his complete protection, ordering and commanding each and every subject of the Roman Empire to render all favor and assistance to these Inquisitors and otherwise to act in the manner that is more fully contained and included in the letter." Apparently, in early December 1486, Kramer actually went to Brussels, the Burgundian capital, hoping to obtain a privilege from the future Emperor (Kramer did not dare to involve Frederick III, whom he had offended previously), but the answer must have been so unfavorable that it could not be inserted into the foreword.

The approbation consists of a preamble and is followed by a resolution in two parts.

==== Preamble ====
It begins with a general statement about circumstances:

IN THE NAME OF Our Lord Jesus Christ. Amen. Let all those who will read, see or hear the present public document know that in the year since the Birth of Our Lord 1487, in the fifth indiction, on Saturday, the nineteenth day of May, at five in the afternoon or thereabouts, in the third year of the Pontificate of Our Lord, the Most Holy Father in Christ, Lord Innocent VIII, by Divine Providence Pope, in the presence of my notary public and of the witnesses written below who had been specifically summoned and asked for this purpose, the venerable and religious Brother Henricus Institoris, Professor of Holy Theology and member of the Order of Preachers, who was appointed as Inquisitor into Heretical Depravity by the Holy See along with his colleague, the venerable and religious Brother Jacobus Sprenger, also a Professor of Holy Theology and Prior of the Convent of Preachers in Cologne[...]

Then, signatories complain that "Some curates of souls and preachers of the Word of God feel no shame at claiming and affirming in their sermons to the congregation that sorceresses do not exist" and notice that the intention of the authors of the Malleus Maleficarum is not primarily to alleviate this ignorance but rather "toil to exterminate the sorceresses by explaining the appropriate methods of sentencing and punishing them in accordance with the text of the aforementioned Bull and the regulations of the Holy Canons, thereby achieving their extermination"; finally, signatories explain why they are providing their expertise:

It is consonant with reason that those things that are done on behalf of the common good should also be confirmed through the common approval of the Doctors, and therefore, lest the aforementioned poorly educated curates and preachers think, in their ignorance of Holy Scripture, that the aforesaid treatise, which was composed in the manner mentioned above, is poorly supported by the determinations and pronouncements of the Doctors, they offered it for examination and comparison against Scripture to the illustrious University of Cologne or rather to certain Professors of Holy Theology, in order that if any things were found to be worthy of censure or incompatible with the Catholic Truth, they should be refuted by the judgment of those Professors, and that those things found to be compatible with the Catholic Truth should be approved. This was in fact done in the ways written below.

==== Resolution ====
There are two signings, sometimes also referenced as two approbations. Four signatories of the first part testify that they have both examined the treatises and endorse the included texts; in the second signing, signatories do not assert that they have read the treatises but nonetheless express approval by explicitly restating some general propositions of the treatises and endorsing those restatements instead.

In the first part, the opinion of a "temporary Dean of the Faculty of Holy Theology at Cologne" namely Lambertus de Monte of 's-Heerenberg (Note: Broedel 2003, p. 93: He was one of the advocates of Aristotelian thought and opponents of via moderna, he was "one of Sprenger's most distinguished colleagues at Cologne, and the man whose name appears first on the faculty endorsement of the Malleus, [he] even went so far as to lead an abortive drive to obtain beatification for Aristotle.") is expressed and then professors Jacobus Straelen of Noetlinck, Andreas Schermer of Ochsenfurt and Master Thoma de Scotia testify that they agree with his opinion. The following is an excerpt from the opinion:

[I proclaim] that this three part treatise, which has been examined by me and carefully compared against Scripture with regard to its first two parts, contains nothing, in my humble judgment at least, that is contrary to the pronouncements of the non-erroneous philosophers, or against the Truth of the Holy, Catholic and Apostolic Faith, or against the determinations of the Doctors approved or admitted by the Holy Church, and that the third part should certainly be upheld and approved in regard to the punishments of those heretics whom it treats, in that it does not contradict Holy Canons, and also because of the personal experiences described in this treatise, which are believed to be true because of the reputation of such great men, particularly since they are inquisitors. It should be ensured that this treatise will become known to learned and zealous men, who will then, on the basis of it, provide various healthy and appropriate advice for the extermination of sorceresses [...]

The second part is signed by those from the first signing and in addition by professors Ulrich Kridweiss of Esslingen, Konrad Vorn of Kampen, Cornelius Pays of Breda and Dietrich of Balveren (Bummel). Signatories attest that:

1) The Masters of Holy Theology written below commend the Inquisitors into Heretical Depravity appointed by the authority of the Apostolic See in conformity with the Canons, and urge that they think it right to carry out their office zealously.
2) The proposition that acts of sorcery can happen with God's permission through sorcerers or sorceresses when the Devil works with them is not contrary to the Catholic Faith, but consonant with the statements of Holy Scripture. Indeed, according to the pronouncements of the Holy Doctors it is necessary to admit that such acts can sometimes happen.
3) It is therefore erroneous to preach that acts of sorcery cannot happen, because in this way preachers impede, to the extent that they can, the pious work of the inquisitors, to the prejudice of the salvation of souls. Nonetheless, secrets that are heard at any time by inquisitors should not be revealed to everyone.
4) All princes and Catholics should be urged to think it right to assist such pious vows on the part of the Inquisitors in defense of the Holy Catholic Faith.

=== Main text ===
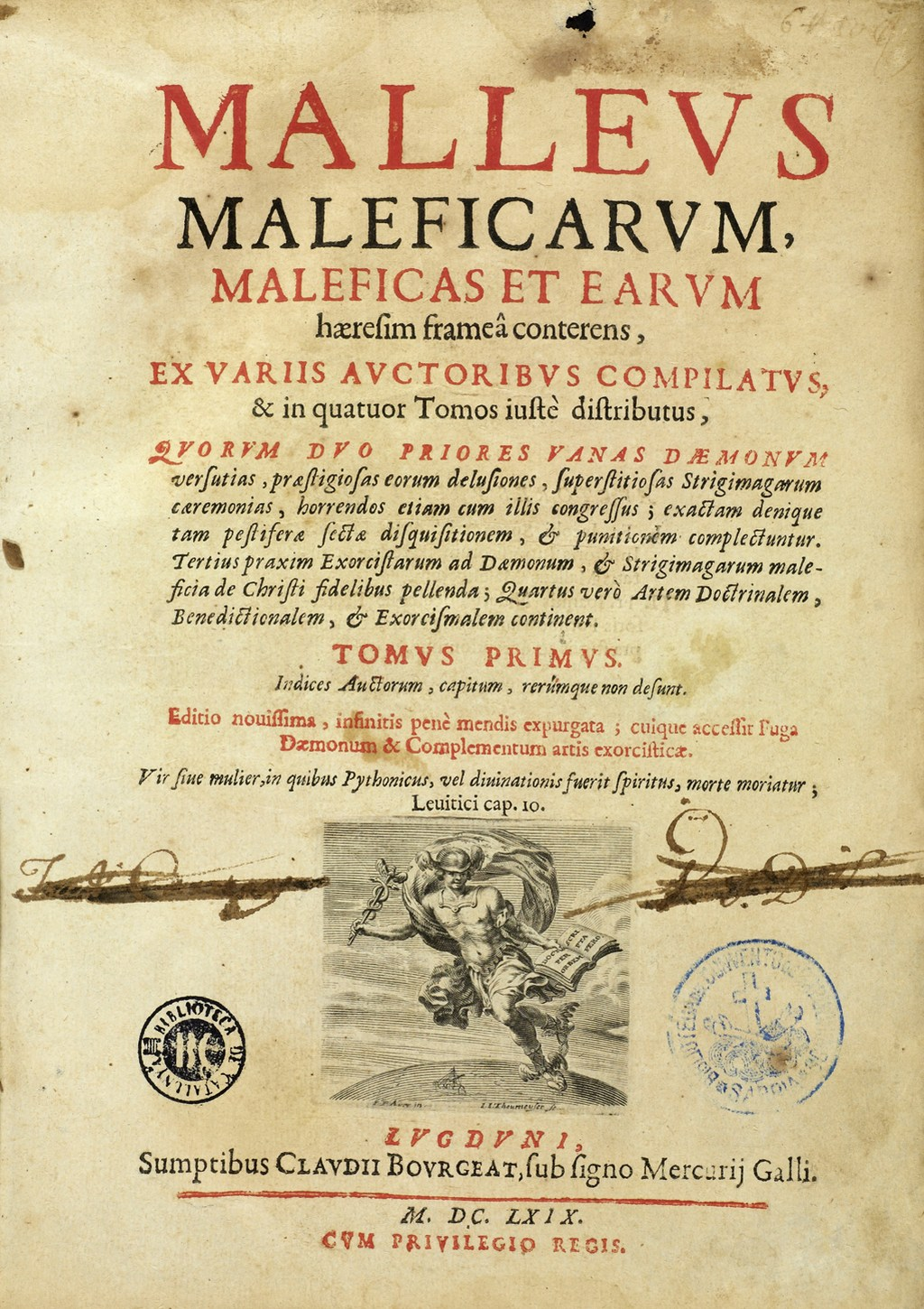
Title page of an edition dated 1669

The Malleus Maleficarum asserts that three elements are necessary for witchcraft: the evil intentions of the witch, the help of the Devil, and the permission of God. The treatise is divided into three sections. The first section is aimed at clergy and tries to refute critics who deny the reality of witchcraft, thereby hindering its prosecution.

The second section describes the actual forms of witchcraft and its remedies. The third section is to assist judges confronting and combating witchcraft, and to aid the inquisitors by removing the burden from them. Each of the three sections has the prevailing themes of what witchcraft is and who is a witch.

==== Section I ====
Section I examines the concept of witchcraft theoretically, from the point of view of natural philosophy and theology. Specifically it addresses the question of whether witchcraft is a real phenomenon or imaginary, perhaps "deluding phantasms of the devil, or simply the fantasies of overwrought human minds". The conclusion drawn is that witchcraft must be real because the Devil is real. Witches entered into a pact with Satan to allow them the power to perform harmful magical acts, thus establishing an essential link between witches and the Devil.

==== Section II ====
Matters of practice and actual cases are discussed, and the powers of witches and their recruitment strategies. It states that it is mostly witches, as opposed to the Devil, who do the recruiting, by making something go wrong in the life of a respectable matron that makes her consult the knowledge of a witch, or by introducing young maidens to tempting young devils. It details how witches cast spells, and remedies that can be taken to prevent witchcraft, or help those who have been affected by it.

==== Section III ====
Section III is the legal part of the Malleus Maleficarum that describes how to prosecute a witch. The arguments are clearly laid for the lay magistrates prosecuting witches. The section offers a step-by-step guide to the conduct of a witch trial, from the method of initiating the process and assembling accusations, to the interrogation (including torture) of witnesses, and the formal charging of the accused. Women who did not cry during their trial were automatically believed to be witches.

== Theological foundations and major themes ==
Jakob Sprenger was an appointed inquisitor for the Rhineland, theology professor and a dean at the University of Cologne in Germany. Heinrich Kraemer (Institoris) was an appointed inquisitor of south Germany, a professor of theology at the University of Salzburg, the leading demonologist and witch-hunter in late medieval Germany. Pope Innocent VIII in the papal bull Summis desiderantes affectibus refers to them both as "beloved sons" and "professors of theology"; also authorizes them to extirpate witchcraft.

This text codified the folklore and beliefs of the Alpine peasants as ‘witchcraft’ and was conceptually dedicated to the implementation of Exodus 22:18: "You shall not permit a sorceress to live.”

Kramer and Sprenger were the first to raise harmful sorcery to the criminal status of heresy. [...] If harmful sorcery is a crime on the order of heresy, Kramer and Sprenger argue, then the secular judges who prosecute it must do so with the same vigor as would the Inquisition in prosecuting a heretic. The Malleus urges them to adopt torture, leading questions, the admission of denunciation as valid evidence, and other Inquisitorial practices to achieve swift results. Moreover, the authors insist that the death penalty for convicted witches is the only sure remedy against witchcraft. They maintain that the lesser penalty of banishment prescribed by Canon Episcopi for those convicted of harmful sorcery does not apply to the new breed of witches, whose unprecedented evil justifies capital punishment.

The first section of the book's main text is written using the scholastic methodology of Thomas Aquinas characterized by a mode of disputed questions most notably used in his Summa Theologica. It was a standard mode of argumentation in scholastic discourse with a long tradition. Most of the citations in the Malleus come from multiple works of Aquinas, a highly influential author in theology. Aquinas is a main source for Section I but is cited in all sections; Formicarius by Johannes Nider is the important source for Section II, and Directorium Inquisitorum by Spanish inquisitor Nicholas Eymeric is a crucial source for Section III.

Importantly, Kramer and Sprenger were convinced that God would never permit an innocent person to be convicted of witchcraft.

=== Torture and confessions ===
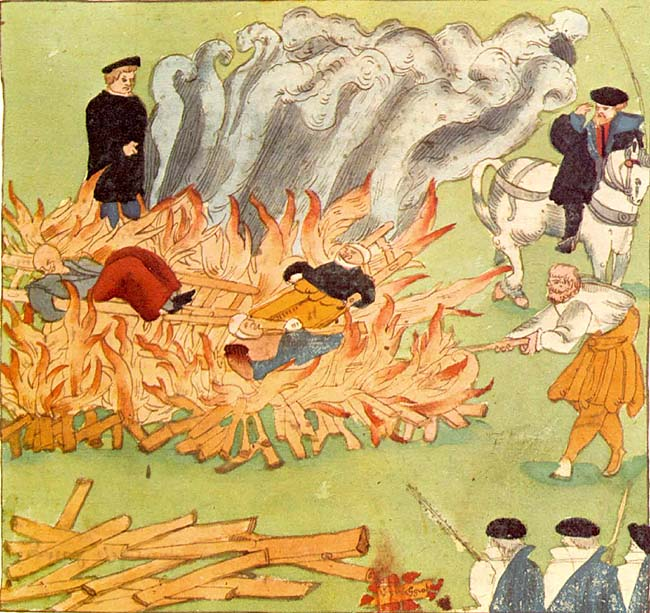
Burning of three alleged witches in Baden, Switzerland (1585), by Johann Jakob Wick

The Malleus recommended not only torture but also deception in order to obtain confessions: "And when the implements of torture have been prepared, the judge, both in person and through other good men zealous in the faith, tries to persuade the prisoner to confess the truth freely; but, if he will not confess, he bid attendants make the prisoner fast to the strappado or some other implement of torture. The attendants obey forthwith, yet with feigned agitation. Then, at the prayer of some of those present, the prisoner is loosed again and is taken aside and once more persuaded to confess, being led to believe that he will in that case not be put to death."

All confessions acquired with the use of torture had to be confirmed: "And note that, if he confesses under the torture, he must afterward be conducted to another place, that he may confirm it and certify that it was not due alone to the force of the torture."

However if there was no confirmation, torture could not be repeated, but it was allowed to continue at a specified day: "But, if the prisoner will not confess the truth satisfactorily, other sorts of tortures must be placed before him, with the statement that unless he will confess the truth, he must endure these also. But, if not even thus he can be brought into terror and to the truth, then the next day or the next but one is to be set for a continuation of the tortures – not a repetition, for it must not be repeated unless new evidences produced. The judge must then address to the prisoners the following sentence: We, the judge, etc., do assign to you, such and such a day for the continuation of the tortures, that from your own mouth the truth may be heard, and that the whole may be recorded by the notary."

=== Victims ===
The treatise describes how women and men become inclined to practice witchcraft. The text argues that women are more susceptible to demonic temptations through the manifold weaknesses of their sex. It was believed that they were weaker in faith and more carnal than men. Michael Bailey claims that most of the women accused as witches had strong personalities and were known to defy convention by overstepping the lines of proper female decorum. After the publication of the Malleus, it seems as though about three quarters of those individuals prosecuted as witches were women.

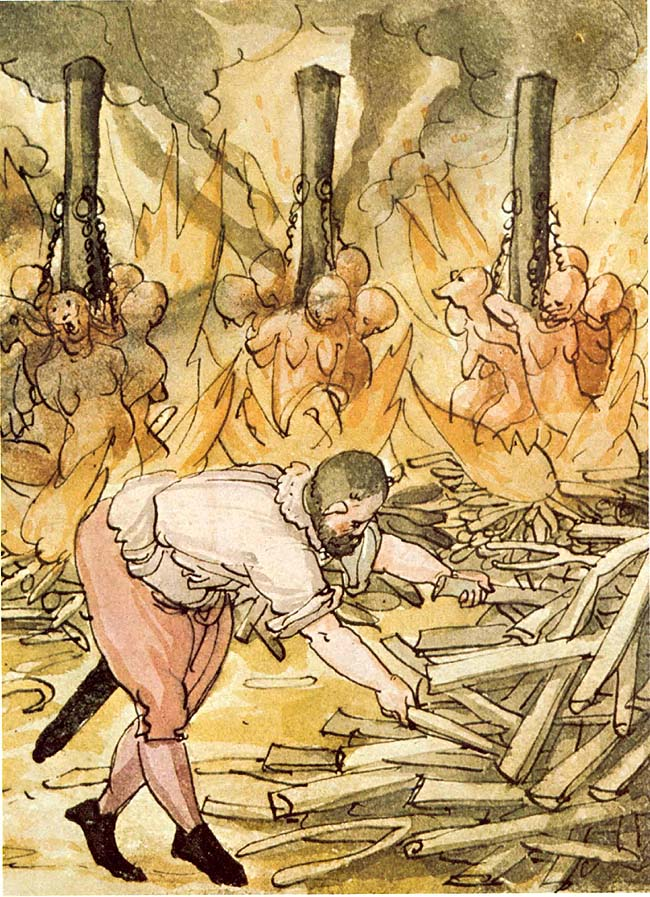
The execution of alleged witches in Central Europe, 1587

Witches were usually female. The reasons for this is the suggestion that women are "prone to believing and because the demon basically seeks to corrupt the faith, he assails them in particular." They also have a "temperament towards flux" and "loose tongues". They "are defective in all the powers of both soul and body" and are stated to be more lustful than men.

The major reason is that at the foundation of sorcery is denial of faith and "woman, therefore, is evil as a result of nature because she doubts more quickly in the faith". Men could be witches, but were considered rarer, and the reasons were also different. The most common form of male witch mentioned in the book is the sorcerer-archer. The book is rather unclear, but the impetus behind male witches seems to come more from desire for power than from disbelief or lust, as it claims is the case for female witches.

Indeed, the very title of the Malleus Maleficarum is feminine, alluding to the idea that it was women who were the villains. Otherwise, it would be the Malleus Maleficorum (the masculine form of the Latin noun maleficus or malefica, 'witch'). In Latin, the feminine maleficarum would only be used for women, while the masculine maleficorum could be used for men alone or for both sexes if together. The Malleus Maleficarum accuses witches of infanticide, cannibalism and casting evil spells to harm their enemies as well as having the power to steal a man's penis. It goes on to give accounts of witches committing these crimes.

Arguments favoring discrimination against women are explicit in the handbook. Those arguments are not novel but constitute a selection from the long tradition of Western misogynist writings. However, according to German literature expert Sigrid Brauner, they are combined to produce new meanings and result in a comprehensive theory. It mixes elements borrowed from Formicarius (1435), Praeceptorium divinae legis (1474) and Lectiones super ecclesiastes (1380).

Kramer and Sprenger develop a powerful sex-specific theory of witchcraft based on a hierarchical and dualistic view of the world. Everything exists in pairs of opposites: God and Satan, Mary and Eve, and men (or virgins) and women. Each positive principle in a pair is delineated by its negative pole. Perfection is defined not as the integration or preservation of opposites, but rather as the extermination of the negative element in a polar pair. Because women are the negative counterpart to men, they corrupt male perfection through witchcraft and must be destroyed.

Although authors give many examples of male witchery in the second part of the handbook, those witchcraft trials that are independently confirmed and that were led by Kramer himself are related to persecution of women almost exclusively. They took place in Ravensburg near Constance (1484) and Innsbruck (since 1485). According to Brauner, trial records confirm that Kramer believed that women are by nature corrupt and evil. His position was in harmony with the scholastic theory at the time.

In contrast, Sprenger never conducted a witch trial though he was consulted in a few cases. Kramer and Sprenger use a metaphor of a world turned upside down by women of which concubines are the most wicked, followed by midwives and then by wives who dominate their husbands. Authors warn of imminent arrival of the apocalypse foretold in the Bible and that men risk bewitchment that leads to impotence and sensation of castration. Brauner explains authors' prescription on how a woman can avoid becoming a witch:

According to the Malleus, the only way a woman can avoid succumbing to her passions – and becoming a witch – is to embrace a life of devout chastity in a religious retreat. But the monastic life is reserved to the spiritually gifted few. Therefore, most women are doomed to become witches, who cannot be redeemed; and the only recourse open to the authorities is to ferret out and exterminate all witches.

=== Elaborated concept of witchcraft ===
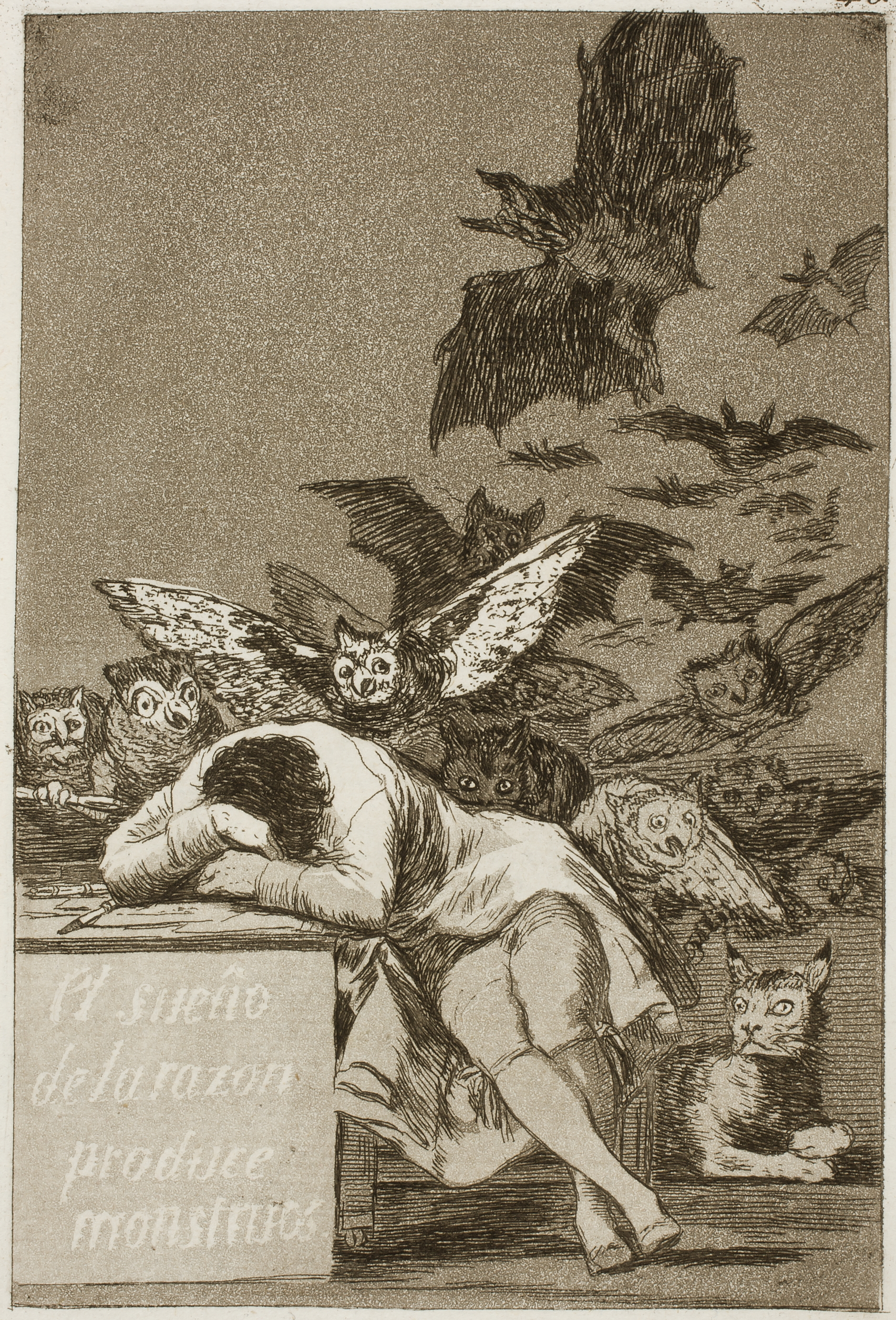
The Sleep of Reason Produces Monsters, c. 1797, 21.5 cm × 15 cm

The strixology of the Malleus Maleficarum is characterized by a very specific conception of what a witch is, one that differs dramatically from earlier times. The terminology of malefica carries an explicit condemnation absent in other words referring to women with supernatural powers. The conception of witches and of magic by extension is one of evil. It differs from earlier conceptions of witchcraft that were much more generalized.

This is the point in history where "witchcraft constituted an independent antireligion". The witch lost her powerful position in relation to the deities; the ability to force the deities to comply with her wishes was replaced by a total subordination to the devil. In short, "[t]he witch became Satan's puppet." This conception of witches was "part of a conception of magic that is termed by scholars as 'Satanism' or 'diabolism'". In this conception, a witch was a member of "a malevolent society presided over by Satan himself and dedicated to the infliction of malevolent acts of sorcery (maleficia) on others."

According to Mackay, this concept of sorcery is characterized by the conviction that those guilty engage in six activities:

1. A pact entered into with the Devil (and concomitant apostasy from Christianity),
2. Sexual relations with the Devil,
3. Aerial flight for the purpose of attending;
4. An assembly presided over by Satan himself (at which initiates entered into the pact, and incest and promiscuous sex were engaged in by the attendees),
5. The practice of maleficent magic,
6. The slaughter of babies.

=== Demonology ===
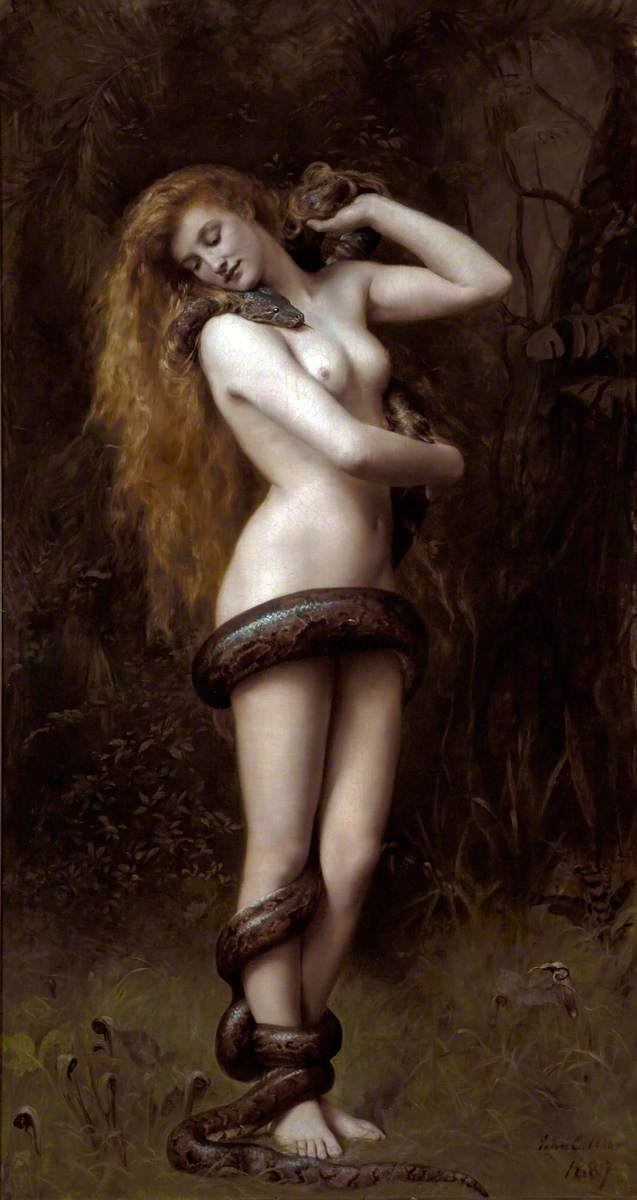
Lilith, 1887 by John Collier, portrays the female demon Lilith cavorting with a snake in the Garden of Eden.

In the Malleus demons are the ones who tempt humans to sorcery and are the main figures in the witches' vows. They interact with witches, usually sexually. The book claims that it is normal for all witches "to perform filthy carnal acts with demons." This is a major part of human-demon interaction and demons do it "not for the sake of pleasure, but for the sake of corrupting."

It is worth noting that not all demons do such things. The book claims that "the nobility of their nature causes certain demons to balk at committing certain actions and filthy deeds." Though the work never gives a list of names or types of demons, like some demonological texts or spellbooks of the era, such as the Liber Juratus, it does indicate different types of demons. For example, it devotes large sections to incubi and succubi and questions regarding their roles in pregnancies, the submission of witches to incubi, and protections against them.

== Approbation and authorship ==
In 1519, a new author was added, Jacob Sprenger. Historians have questioned why, since this was 33 years after the book's first printing, and 24 years after Sprenger died.

In the 19th century, Joseph Hansen, a historian who was appalled by the witch-craze and those who carried it out, first proposed that coauthorship by Sprenger was a falsehood presented by Institoris (Kramer) and that approbation is partially a forgery.

Christopher Mackay, author of the modern academic translation of the Malleus into English, offers rebuttals to arguments of proponents of this theory and in an interview gives an accessible summary:

The argument was made in the nineteenth century by a scholar hostile to what the Malleus stood for that the approbation was a forgery by Institoris and that Sprenger had nothing to do with the composition. The evidence for this is in my view very tenuous (and the main argument is clearly invalid). Nonetheless, once the argument was put forward, it took on a life of its own, and people continue to advance arguments in favor of the idea that Sprenger's involvement was a falsification perpetrated by Institoris, despite the fact that this argument was vitiated from the start.

In addition, Mackay points out that allegations raised in support of this theory that supposedly two of the signatories had not in fact signed the approbation are unsubstantiated.

A similar response is offered by the author of the first translation of the Malleus into English Montague Summers. In his introduction, he ignores completely the theory that joint authorship or approbation could be a mystification. Nonetheless, he mentions briefly that it was questioned whether Kramer or Sprenger contributed more to the work. He comments that "in the case of such a close collaboration any such inquiry seems singularly superfluous and nugatory". (Note: According to Summers, "It has been asked whether Kramer or Sprenger was principally responsible for the Malleus, but in the case of so close a collaboration any such inquiry seems singularly superfluous and nugatory.")

Broedel, a historian who writes that it is likely that Sprenger's contribution was minimal, nonetheless says that "Sprenger certainly wrote the Apologia auctoris which prefaces the Malleus and agreed to be a coauthor.

Encyclopædia Britannica and The Encyclopedia of Witches, Witchcraft and Wicca ignore completely Hansen's theory and list Sprenger and Kramer as co-authors.

Wolfgang Behringer argues that Sprenger's name was only added as an author beginning in 1519, thirty-three years after the book was first published and decades after Sprenger's own death. One of Sprenger's friends who was still alive denounced the addition of Sprenger's name as a forgery, stating that Sprenger had nothing to do with the book.

Many historians have also pointed out that Sprenger's actual views in his confirmed writings are often the opposite of the views in the Malleus, and Sprenger was unlikely to have been a colleague of Kramer since Sprenger in fact banned Kramer from preaching and entering Dominican convents within his jurisdiction, and spoke out against him on many occasions.

The alleged approval from the theologians at Cologne, which Kramer included in the Malleus with a list of names of theologians who he claimed approved the book, has also been questioned by many historians, since in 1490 the clergy at Cologne condemned the book and at least two of the clergy listed by Kramer, Thomas de Scotia and Johann von Wörde, publicly denied having approved the Malleus.

Jacob Sprenger's name was added as an author beginning in 1519, 33 years after the book's first publication and 24 years after Sprenger's death.

Jenny Gibbons, a Neo-Pagan and a historian, writes: "Actually the Inquisition immediately rejected the legal procedures Kramer recommended and censured the inquisitor himself just a few years after the Malleus was published. Secular courts, not inquisitorial ones, resorted to the Malleus".

The preface also includes an allegedly unanimous approbation from the University of Cologne's Faculty of Theology. Nevertheless, many historians have argued that it is well established by sources outside the Malleus that the university's theology faculty condemned the book for unethical procedures and for contradicting Catholic theology on a number of important points: "just for good measure Institoris forged a document granting their apparently unanimous approbation."

== Authors' whereabouts and circumstances ==
=== Preceding publication ===
In 1484 Heinrich Kramer had made one of the first attempts at prosecuting alleged witches in the Tyrol region. It was not a success and he was asked to leave the city of Innsbruck. According to Diarmaid MacCulloch, writing the book was Kramer's act of self-justification and revenge. Ankarloo and Clark claim that Kramer's purpose in writing the book was to explain his own views on witchcraft, systematically refute arguments claiming that witchcraft does not exist, discredit those who expressed skepticism about its reality, claim that those who practiced witchcraft were more often women than men, and to convince magistrates to use Kramer's recommended procedures for finding and convicting witches.

Kramer wrote the Malleus following his expulsion from Innsbruck by the local bishop, due to charges of illegal behavior against Kramer himself, and because of Kramer's obsession with the sexual habits of one of the accused, Helena Scheuberin, which led the other tribunal members to suspend the trial.

Kramer received a papal bull, Summis desiderantes affectibus, in 1484. It directed Bishop of Strasburg (then Albert of Palatinate-Mosbach) to accept the authority of Heinrich Kramer as an Inquisitor, although the motivation of the papal bull was likely political. The Malleus Maleficarum was finished in 1486 and the papal bull was included as part of its preface, implying papal approval for the work.

=== Post-publication ===
Kramer was intensely writing and preaching until his death in Bohemia in 1505. He was asked by Nuremberg council to provide expert consultation on the procedure of witch trial in 1491. His prestige was not fading. In 1495 he was summoned by the Master General of the Order, Joaquin de Torres, O.P. to Venice and gave very popular public lectures and disputations. They were worthy of presence and patronage of Patriarch of Venice.

He also wrote treatises Several Discourses and Various Sermons upon the Most Holy Sacrament of the Eucharist (Nuremberg, 1496); A Tract Confuting the Errors of Master Antonio degli Roselli (Venice, 1499); followed by The Shield of Defence of the Holy Roman Church Against the Picards and Waldenses which were quoted by many authors. He was appointed as papal nuncio and his assignment as inquisitor was changed to Bohemia and Moravia by Pope Alexander VI in 1500.

Sprenger continued his work as Inquisitor Extraordinary for the Provinces of Mainz, Trèves and Cologne. Later, he was elected Provincial Superior of the whole German Province (in 1488). He had enormous responsibilities. He received a letter from the pope praising his enthusiasm and energy in 1495.

Summers observes that 17th-century "Dominican chroniclers, such as Quétif and Échard, number Kramer and Sprenger among the glories and heroes of their Order".

== Popularity and influence ==
The sex-specific theory developed in the Malleus Maleficarum laid the foundations for the widespread consensus in early modern Germany on the tie between the evil nature of witches and women. Later works on witchcraft did not fully agree with the Malleus but none of them challenged the view that women were more inclined to become witches than men. Very few authors saw the need to explain why witches are largely women, as the connection was deemed self-evident. Those who did usually attributed female witchery to the authors' belief that women were relatively mentally and physically weak, with a few attributing the disparity to female sexuality.

Some authors argue that the book's publication was not as influential as earlier authors believed. (Note: "In its own day it was never accorded the unquestioned authority that modern scholars have sometimes given it. Theologians and jurists respected it as one among many informative books; its particular savage misogyny and its obsession with impotence were never fully accepted", Monter, The Sociology of Jura Witchcraft, in The Witchcraft Reader, p. 116 (2002)) According to MacCulloch, the Malleus Maleficarum was one of several key factors contributing to the witch craze, along with popular superstition, and tensions created by the Reformation. According to Encyclopædia Britannica:

The Malleus went through 28 editions between 1486 and 1600 and was accepted by Roman Catholics and Protestants alike as an authoritative source of information concerning Satanism and as a guide to Christian defence [against acts of Satan].

— Encyclopædia Britannica

=== Factors stimulating widespread use ===
The Malleus Maleficarum was able to spread throughout Europe rapidly in the late 15th and at the beginning of the 16th century due to the innovation of the printing press in the middle of the 15th century by Johannes Gutenberg. The invention of printing some thirty years before the first publication of the Malleus Maleficarum contributed to the fervor of witch hunting, as the press swiftly propagated materials spreading the hysteria.

The late 15th century was also a period of religious turmoil. The Malleus Maleficarum and the witch craze that ensued took advantage of the increasing intolerance of the Reformation and Counter-Reformation in Europe, where the Protestant and Catholic camps, pitted against one another, each zealously strove to maintain what each side deemed as the purity of Christian faith. The Catholic Counter-Reformation eventually evened out this religious turmoil.

== Reception ==
Heinrich Kramer was condemned by the Inquisition in 1490 for recommending unethical and illegal methods, and for not following the doctrines of the church regarding demonology.

Moira Smith writes that the book has been seen as "one of the most infamous and despised of books".

== Translations ==
The Latin book was firstly translated by J. W. R. Schmidt into German in 1906; an expanded edition of three volumes was published in 1923. Montague Summers was responsible for the first English translation in 1928.

Year	Target language	Description
2019	Arabic	مطرقة الساحرات trans. by Ahmed Khalid Mustafa
2009	English	The Hammer of Witches: A Complete Translation of the Malleus Maleficarum, trans. by Christopher S. Mackay (Cambridge: Cambridge University Press, 2009)
2007	English	The Malleus Maleficarum, ed. and trans. by P.G. Maxwell-Stuart (Manchester: Manchester University Press, 2007) (partial translation, this work excludes or summarizes crucial sections)
2006	English	Henricus Institoris and Jacobus Sprenger, Malleus Maleficarum, ed. and trans. by Christopher S. Mackay, 2 vols (Cambridge: Cambridge University Press, 2006) (edition in vol. 1 and translation in vol. 2)
2000	German	Der Hexenhammer: Malleus Maleficarum, trans. by Günter Jerouschek, Wolfgang Behringer, Werner Tschacher
1929 (Note: second version; first was published in 1928)	English	Malleus Maleficarum - The Witch Hammer, J. Sprenger, H. Kramer, trans. by Montague Summers
1923 (Note: expanded edition; first was published in 1906)	German	Der Hexenhammer von Jakob Sprenger und Heinrich Institoris, trans. by Johann Wilhelm Richard Schmidt (available online 1923 edition)

== See also ==
- Christian views on magic
- Torture of witches
- Discoverie of Witchcraft
- Salem witch trials
- Friedrich Spee
- Daemonologie, a witchcraft-related tract written by King James VI of Scotland
