= The Four Naked Women (Dürer) =

1497 engraving by Albrecht Dürer

The Four Witches
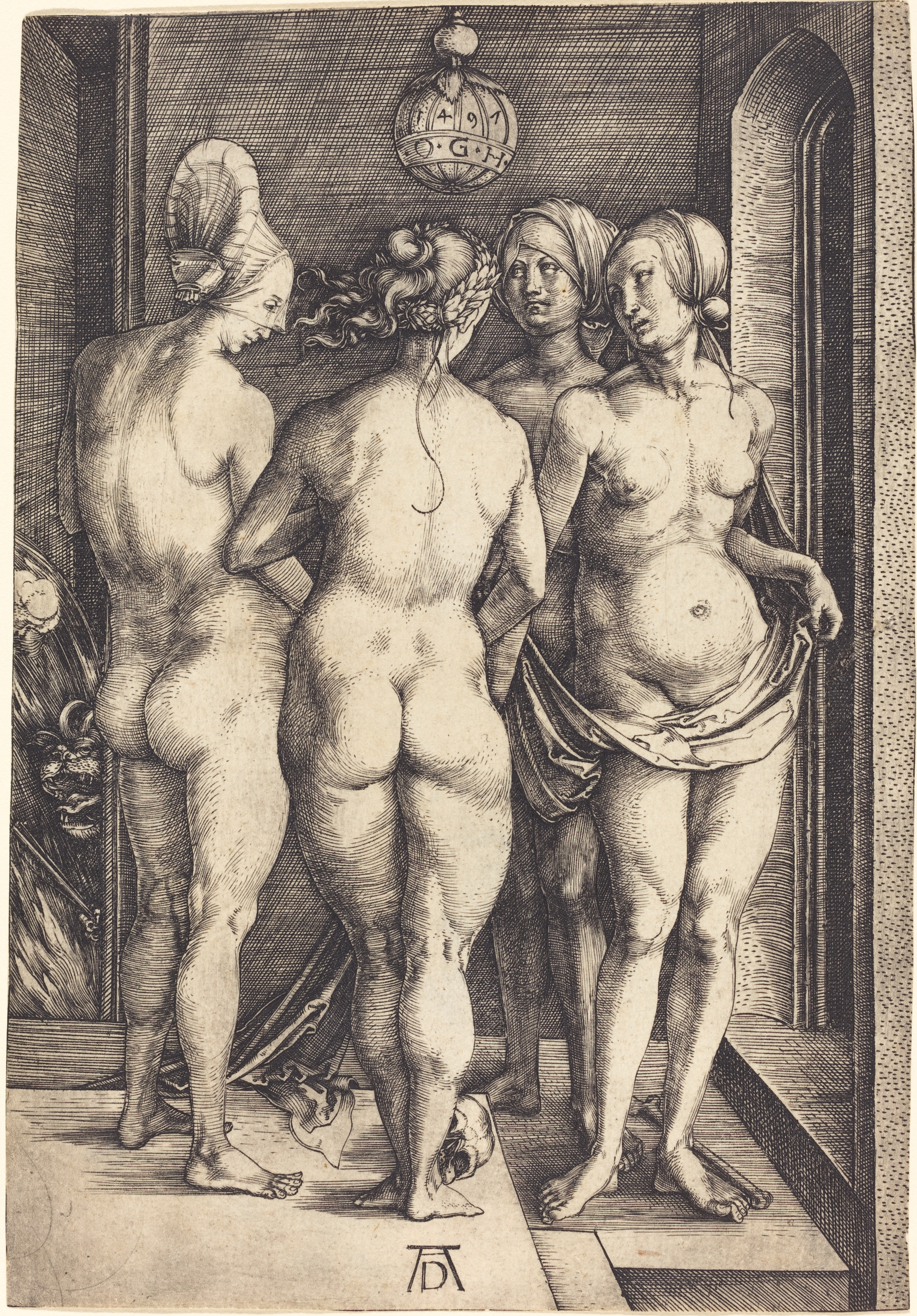
- The Four Witches, impression in the National Gallery of Art, Washington, D.C.
- Artist: Albrecht Dürer
- Year: 1497
- Type: engraving, trimmed within platemark
- Dimensions: 21.6 cm × 15.6 cm (8.5 in × 6.1 in)

The Four Naked Women, or The Four Witches (German: Die Vier Hexen), or The Four Sorceresses or Scene in a Brothel, are titles given to a 1497 engraving by the German Renaissance artist Albrecht Dürer. It is one of his earliest signed engravings and shows four exuberant nude women gathered conspiratorially in a circle in a confined interior setting, perhaps a bathhouse, which appears to have entrances from either side. Although the image is clearly erotic, a small horned demon in the left-hand portal, perhaps representing temptation, looks out and holds what may be a hunting object, engulfed in flames.

Although the engraving has been subject to prolonged and significant scholarly analysis it remains enigmatic, and there is nothing in Dürer's writings to indicate his intent. There is no consensus as to its subject matter or its intended meaning, with art historians associating it with either witch hunting or figures from classical mythology. The women stand underneath a suspended globe or sphere and before an open stone window, which, given the human skull and thigh bone placed across from it, may be a gateway to death. These attributes have also been used to argue that the women are engaged in some type of nefarious scheme, perhaps linked to the 1487 inquisition treatise Malleus Maleficarum. The alternative view is that the women represent Greek or Roman goddesses, perhaps Hecate, patroness of evil magic, poisonous plants, and ghosts, or her earthly counterpart Diana.

Dürer's monogram "AD" appears on the centre of the floor. Numerous original prints exist, held at a number of major museums.

== Description ==
The women are positioned in a small interior space which contains a window and can be entered or exited from two sides. The small devil in the left hand recess has mammalian anatomy including hind legs, and holds a partly obscured object in his claw that appears to consist of sticks and a piece of string, perhaps meant to be a contemporary device for hunting birds and fowl. The devil's form and gestures closely resemble a similar small bat-like monster in Durer's The Dream of the Doctor of 1498–99, an engraving close in date and style to the Four Witches.

The differing hairstyles and headdresses suggest that the women are from different social classes, as differing types of headdresses were often used in medieval and early Renaissance pictures to indicate social and moral aspects of individuals. This was especially so in Nuremberg, where guidelines on the matter were issued by the Nuremberg council. The woman on the left wears a Haube (a type of bonnet, in German a Festhaube), usually reserved for married women. The woman to the far right, facing the viewer, wears a long folded veil (Schleier), indicating that she comes from the middle class.

At this early stage in his life, Dürer struggled with the restrictions of drawing for engraving and the portrayal of nudes. Compared to his nudes in the near contemporary Small Fortune which shows a female satyr nursing her infant, or The Penance of St John Chrysostom, the current work seems more reliant on Renaissance prototypes, although they are, according to art historian Charles Ilsley Minott "taller, sturdier, and more graceful."

== Interpretation ==
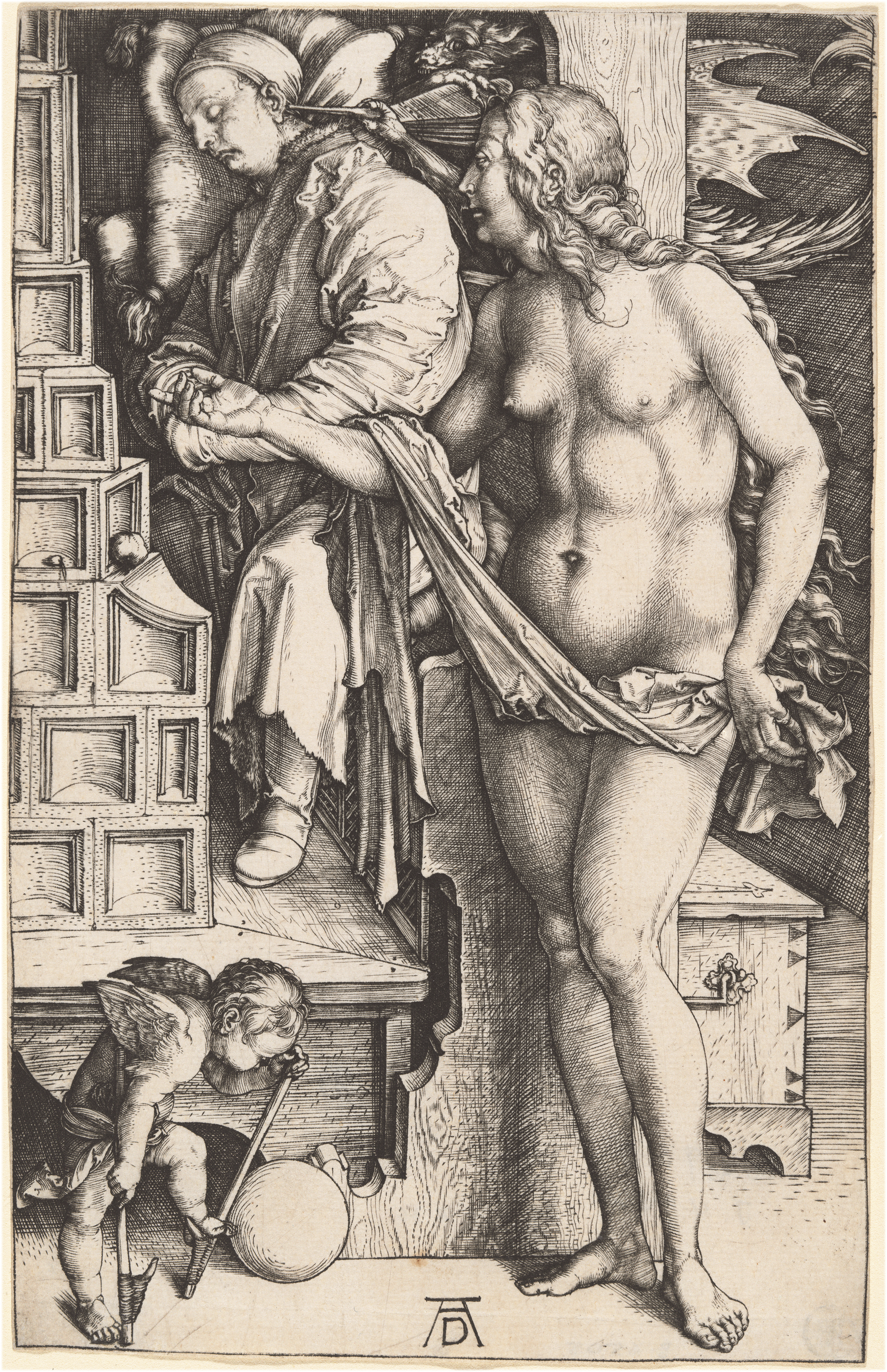
Albrecht Dürer, The Dream of the Doctor, engraving, 1498–99. This engraving similarly associates a nude figure with diabolic activity.

As with many of Dürer's engravings, the intended meaning or source is unclear; although it has been subject to wide scholarly analysis, no real consensus has emerged. Possible interpretations range from the four seasons and the four elements, to Aphrodite (represented here by the central woman wearing a myrtle wreath) and the Graces, the Three Fates, or more simply four witches or four girls in a brothel. The art historian Marcel Briton suggests that the work may not have any specific meaning and is simply a portrait of four nudes, "the whim of a young artist annoyed by the puritanical conventionality of his fellow-citizens".

Because Dürer himself did not title the work, it has been given many titles over the centuries. When the painting was first described by Karel van Mander in 1604, he wrote that it contained "three or four nude women, looking just like the three Graces." Common titles have included Scene in a Brothel, Scene of Witchcraft, Venus and the Three Graces, The Seasons of the Year, The Four Temperaments, and Diana and Hecate Trivia.

=== Witchcraft ===
The human skull and bone left on the floor are intended as either reminders of death or symbols of magic and invocation. The witches may be linked to the misogynistic "Malleus maleficarum" (The Witches' Hammer) the "virulent diatribe" written in 1487 by the Dominican friars and inquisitors Heinrich Kramer and Jacob Sprenger. The book endorsed the extermination of witches and so developed a convoluted and detailed legal and theological theory to justify its treatise.

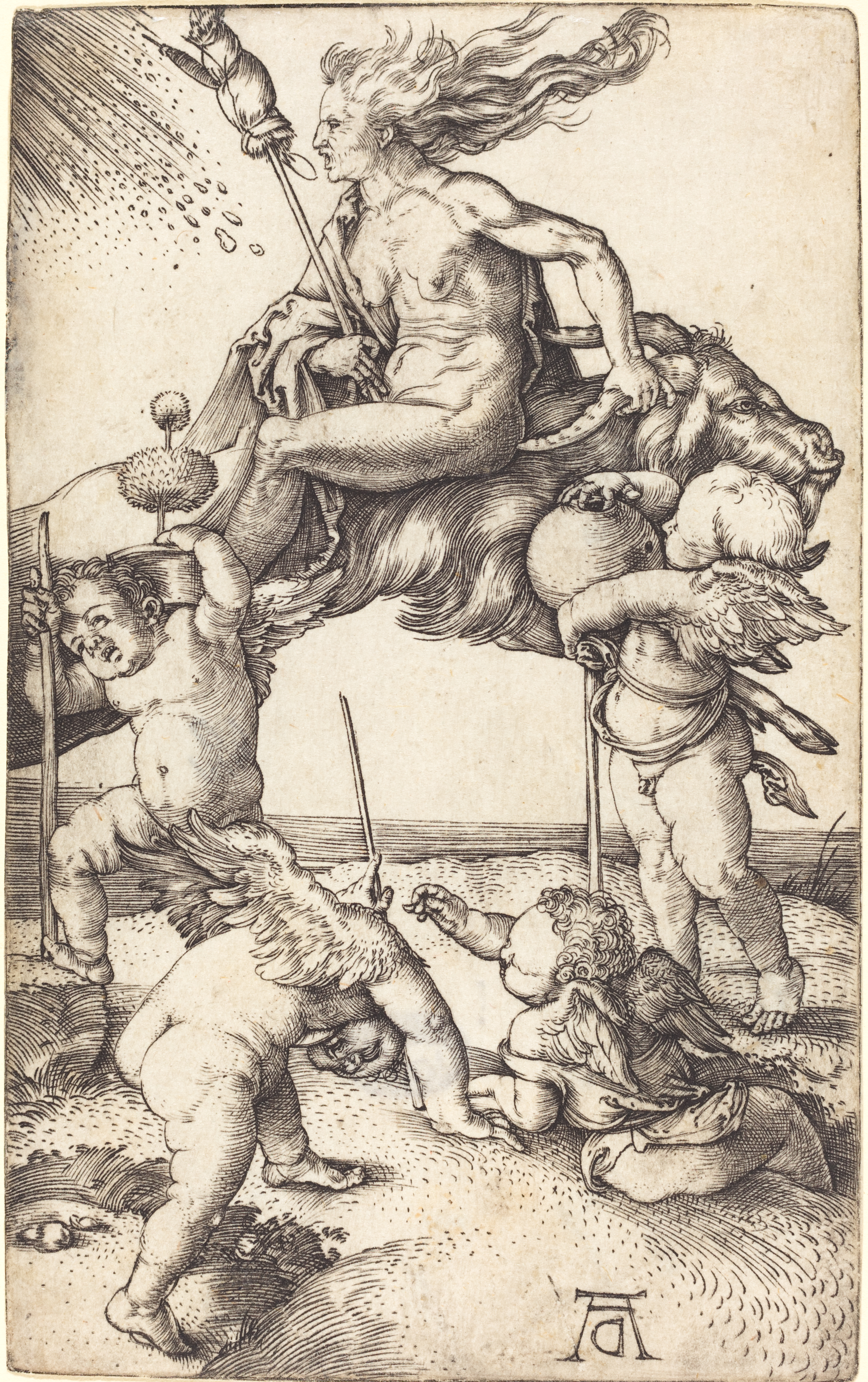
Albrecht Dürer, Witch Riding Backwards on a Goat, engraving, c. 1500

Because the women's hands are largely hidden, the image is not thought to refer to any specific activity or event. However, it was at the time commonly believed that men who had sex with so-called she-devils would later suffer from illness and impotence. Around 1500, Durer produced Witch Riding Backwards on a Goat, which, according to art historian Margaret Sullivan, like the current work, reflects "a fascination with the underside of the ancient world rather than an interest in witch manuals or a compelling concern with witchcraft as a punishable offence." The engraving resembles in a number of ways Hans Baldung Grien's Bewitched Groom, completed the year before his death in 1545. However, Dürer and Baldung's works, while contemporary with the "Malleus maleficarum," were made significantly earlier than the widespread outbreak of moral panic leading to the witch-hunting of the later 16th and 17th centuries. According to Sullivan, "The work of Dürer and Baldung belong to an earlier era, they testify to a different sensibility and were produced by artists who could not have foreseen the terrible times to come."

=== Classical mythology ===
The most widely accepted meaning is that the work is an allegorical warning against pride, and its inevitable result of death and punishment in hell. Compositionally, the positioning of the women matches a marble group of the Three Graces from the early Renaissance, which Dürer would have known from copies. A common interpretation is that figures represent Hecate, who was "often represented with three faces or bodies, probably to suggest that she could look in all directions at doorways or crossings". Alternatively, the woman from the second right wearing a wreath may represent Discordia, the Roman goddess of strife and discord, who threw an apple amongst Juno, Minerva and Venus, igniting the Trojan War. Or it may be that the central woman is being initiated by the other three women into witchcraft.

The globe hanging above the figures is divided into twelve segments and contains two inscriptions; the year 1497 and the letters "OGH" - perhaps meaning "Odium generis humani" (Odium (disgust or ambush) against the human race), or "Oh Gott hüte" (Oh God Forbid) as suggested in 1675 by the German art-historian and painter Joachim von Sandrart, or "Ordo Graciarum Horarumque" (Order of the Graces and Hours). Scholar Jeroen Stumpel has also suggested that the initials may stand for Ordnungen gegen Hoffart ("Regulations against pride"), the name given to the sumptuary laws of Nuremburg during Dürer's lifetime.

The image has been copied and adapted a number of times. Nicoletto da Modena (1490-1569) produced a version based on the Judgement of Paris interpretation, changing the inscription on the globe to "Detur Pulchrior" (To the fairest), and omitting the devil and bones.
