= Strixology =

Strixology is a genre of writing about the reality and dangers of witches, their origins, character and power; often in the context of theology or of demonology. (The Latin word strix can mean "screech-owl" or "witch".)

During the early modern period strixologists refuted the reality of witches and contributed to the decline of witch-hunts.

As a systematic study, strixology emerged during the period 1431–1439 at the Council of Basel - an ecclesiastical council where theologians and demonologists met and debated what was seen as the Devil's work, magical observations and confessions of witches. Those issues were not a primary purpose of the council. Nonetheless, the subject of one of the discussions was a peasant named Stedelen who was believed to have committed maleficia (Note: harmful acts of witchcraft) and who said under torture that he was a part of a secret society of Devil-worshippers. This story was disturbing enough to be reported to the council by Peter of Simmental and described in great detail.

This case and similar revelations were later used by the Dominican professor Johannes Nider, a participant at the council's meetings, as examples in his Formicarius (1436-1438) a book that laid the foundations of strixology. Scholars cited this significant work for centuries. Around the time Formicarius was published, there was a relatively small number of witch-hunt victims - estimated to have been in the hundreds.

This changed at the end of the 15th century, partially due to the publication of the infamous Malleus Maleficarum which cemented belief in the reality of witches and in the higher susceptibility of women to take part in witchcraft. The book proclaimed that “evils which are performed by witches exceed all other sin which God has ever permitted to be done.…”. The Malleus Maleficarum adamantly pushed its views on the threat of witches in society. The text boldly claims that "[witches] exist" and "to defend the opposite view steadfastly is altogether heretical"
