= Caspar Erich Schieler =

German theologian (1851-1934)

Caspar Erasmus Schieler
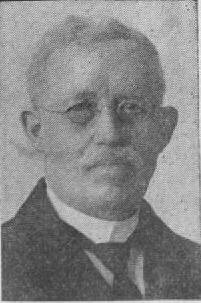
- Schieler in 1933
- Born: July 14, 1851; Ober-Erlenbach, Bad Homburg, Germany
- Died: January 13, 1934 (aged 82); St. Charles, Missouri
- Occupations: Theologian, historian, professor and pastor
- Title: Doctor
- Spouse: Friedericka Tschiershwitz
- Children: 1

Caspar Erasmus (Erich) Schieler (July 14, 1851 – January 13, 1934) was a German theologian, church historian and priest in the late 19th century and early 20th century. According to documents provided by Mainz Cathedral and the Diocesan Seminary, Schieler studied philosophy and theology at the Episcopal Seminary in Mainz (closed during the Kulturkampf in 1878), receiving the Doctor of Divinity degree. Schieler first served as a priest at the age of twenty-five at Mainz, Cathedral ordained under Bishop Wilhelm Emmanuel von Ketteler in the year 1876. Due to the Kulturkampf, Schieler was interrogated by the German government and forced to pastor his parish in secret, to avoid further attention. While secretly pastoring in Weisskirchen, Schieler began working on his dissertation: Magister Johannes Nider, for which he received the degree of Doctor of Theology, magna cum laude in Würzburg, Germany in the year 1886. Schieler then become the Professor of Moral Theology at Diocesan Seminary of Mainz in Baden-Württemberg. After breaking from the Catholic Church and converting to Protestantism, Schieler continued writing books and became a pastor in the German Evangelical Synod of North America, which later merged into the United Church of Christ, a mainline Protestant Christian denomination, with historical confessional roots in the Reformed, Congregational and Lutheran traditions. Schieler served as a Professor of theology and Latin American and German language and literature at the Mission House College, which later became Lakeland University. At the request of the Educational Department, Schieler later took up a teaching position at Redfield College, teaching theology in Redfield, South Dakota. Schieler was then called upon by the German Evangelical Synod of North America, to teach and preach in communities in Hartsburg, Missouri, Hamel and Johannisburg, Illinois and Marion, Wisconsin.

== Publications and legacy ==
Schieler is best known for his detailed guide in the administration of the sacrament of penance as described in his book: Theory and Practice of the Confessional: A Guide in the Administration of the Sacrament of Penance (1905) This was among the first of his works to be translated into the English language and was distributed widely throughout the United States. Schieler was also well known for his regular contributions to The Theological Magazine, The Messenger of Peace, The Celebration and The Christian Children's Newspaper.

=== Writings on church history ===
Schieler also wrote extensively on the subject of church history, most notably on Johannes Nider, the German theologian who wrote the Formicarius. Schieler addressed the life and legacy of Nider, as well as his impact on 15th century German-Christian thought in his book: Magister Johannes Nider From The Order of the Preacher-Brother (Translated from German)( 1885) Schieler also recorded the history of Julius Rupp and the 19th century Christian church in his work: Dr. Julius Rupp: The Free Religious Movement in the Catholic and Protestant Churches in the 19th century: A Contribution to Church History in the 19th Century (Translated from German). Lastly, Schieler wrote about the Italian, Dominican friar and philosopher Giordano Bruno in his book: Giordano Bruno, The Poet-Philosopher and Martyr of Freedom of Mind: His Life's Destiny and its Significance According to the Results of the Latest Research (1901)(Translated from German)

==== Other writings ====
- Ecclesiastical Liberalism and the Free Religious Communities (1911)
- A rebuttal to the German Assyriologist, Friedrich Delitzsch in: Vortrags Uber Die Babel Und Bibelfrage (1903),
- Mein Austritt aus der katholischen Kirche : Worte zur Aufklärung u. Mahnung (1901).
- "St. Rochus-Büchlein zum Gebrauche bei öffentlichen und Privat-Andachten zu Ehren des hl. Rochus" (1885).
