= Jean Céard =

French historian and academic (1936–2025)

- Born: 17 May 1936; Chaumont, France
- Died: 1 January 2025 (aged 88)
- Education: École normale supérieure Paris-Sorbonne University (DND)
- Occupations: Historian; Academic

Jean Céard (17 May 1936 – 1 January 2025) was a French historian and academic who specialised in the Renaissance.

== Life and career ==
Born in Chaumont on 17 May 1936, Céard was vice-president of the Jeunes Budé section at his secondary school. In 1957, he graduated from the École normale supérieure and prepared for a master's degree at the University of Paris. However, he ended up attended the École son service militaire in Algeria from 1961 to 1963.

Upon his return to France, Céard became a teacher at the Lycée Pothier in Orléans. From 1966 to 1969, he was an assistant literature professor at the University of Tours and until 1971 was a master's assistant at the University of Orleans. At the University of Paris, he prepared a doctoral thesis on Ambroise Paré in 1970, which was published by Librairie Droz the following year. The thesis was a critique of Des monstres et prodiges by Paré. He obtained the doctorate in 1975, when the university had split off into Paris-Sorbonne University. The thesis, under the direction of Verdun-Léon Saulnier, was titled Monstres et prodiges au XVIe siècle : contribution à l'histoire de l'idée de nature à la Renaissance and was again published by Librairie Droz under the title La Nature et les prodiges : l'insolite au XVIe siècle en France.

A lecturer at Paris-East Créteil University until 1975, Céard was then a professor there until 1993, when he moved to Paris Nanterre University, where he eventually became a professor emeritus. On 7 December 2012, he became a corresponding member of the International Academy of the History of Science.

Throughout his career, Céard published critiques on Renaissance texts, such as those of Pierre de Ronsard, published in the Bibliothèque de la Pléiade, as well as the works of Pontus de Tyard. On the 400th anniversary of Paré's death, he published a critique titled Des animaux et de l'excellence de l'homme, published by InterUniversitaires. He also wrote critical texts on Pierre Boaistuau, Guy Lefèvre de la Boderie, and Pierre de Lancre. In 2019, he received the Prix de la critique from the Académie Française. He contributed to pocket editions of the Essays by Michel de Montaigne, as well as novels by François Rabelais with Le Livre de Poche. He wrote an anthology of French Renaissance literature with Louis-Georges Tin that were published by Éditions Gallimard. He also published Latin translations, such as Formicarius by Johannes Nider, published by Éditions Jérôme Millon, and Des causes cachées des choses by Jean Fernel, published by Les Belles Lettres.

Céard died on 1 January 2025, at the age of 88.

== Works ==
=== Essays ===
- La nature et les prodiges : l'insolite au XVIe siècle en France (1977)
- Aux origines de certains thèmes leibniziens, vol. 2 : Rébus de Picardie : les manuscrits f. fr. 5658 et 1600 de la Bibliothèque nationale (1986)
- L'univers obscur du corps : représentation et gouvernement des corps à la Renaissance (2021)

=== Critiques ===
- Des monstres et prodiges : édition critique et commentée par Jean Céard (1971)
- Œuvres complètes. XI, Second livre des meslanges. 1559. Les Œuvres. 1560 : édition critique, avec introduction et commentaires par Paul Laumonier; revue et augmentée par Jean Céard (1992)
- Œuvres complètes. 1 : édition critique, établie, présentée et annotée par Jean Céard (1993)
- Œuvres complètes. 2 : édition critique, établie, présentée et annotée par Jean Céard, Daniel Ménager et Michel Simonin (1994)
- Les cinq livres : édition critique de Jean Céard, Gérard Defaux et Michel Simonin (1994)
- Le tiers livre : édition critique sur le texte publié en 1552 à Paris par Michel Fezandat (1994)
- Des animaux et de l'excellence de l'homme : texte établi et annoté par Jean Céard (2000)
- Essais : édition réalisée par Denis Bjaï, Bénédicte Boudou, Jean Céard et Isabelle Pantin; sous la direction de Jean Céard (2001)
- Les sorciers et leurs tromperies : « La fourmilière », livre V : texte établi et traduit par Jean Céard; annoté par Jean Céard; avec la collaboration de Sophie Houdard, de Maxime Préaud et de Daniel Teysseire; introduction par Sophie Houdard et Nicole Jacques-Lefèvre; textes et travaux d'histoire de la sorcellerie sous la direction de Nicole Jacques-Lefèvre et de Maxime Préaud (2005)
- Histoires prodigieuses (édition de 1561) : Introduction par Stephen Bamforth; texte établi par Stephen Bamforth et annoté par Jean Céard (2010)
- Le premier curieux ou Premier discours de la nature du monde et de ses parties : sous la direction d'Eva Kushner; texte établi, introduit et annoté par Jean Céard (2010)
- Mantice ou Discours de la vérité de divination par astrologie : sous la direction d'Eva Kushner; texte établi, introduit et annoté par Jean Céard (2014)
- Hymnes ecclésiastiques, 1578 : édition critique; introduction par Jean Céard et Franco Giacone; texte établi et annoté par Jean Céard; appendices par Franco Giacone (2014)
- Les Œuvres : Édition critique par Evelyne Berriot-Salvadore, Jean Céard et Guylaine Pineau; sous la direction d'Evelyne Berriot-Salvadore (2014)
- L'empire des tropiques : 1855 : fiction médicale inédite présentée, éditée et annotée par Jacqueline Lalouette et Jean Céard (2020)
- Des causes cachées des choses : édition critique et traduction par Jean Céard (2021)
- Tableau de l'inconstance des mauvais anges et démons : édition de 1613 établie et annotée par Jean Céard (2022)
- La droite imposition des noms : édition critique par Eva Kushner, Jean-Claude Margolin, Sophie Kessler-Mesguichet et Colette Nativel; traduction et édition critique par Jean Céard (2022)

=== Anthology ===
- Anthologie de la poésie française du XVIe siècle (with Louis-George Tin, 2005)
