= Helena Scheuberin =

Austrian defendant of 1485 witch trial

Helena Scheuberin (fl. 1485) was an Austrian woman who stood trial accused of witchcraft in 1485. Her trial and acquittal led Heinrich Kramer to write Malleus Maleficarum, which was published two years later.

== Life ==
Helena Scheuberin was born and lived in Innsbruck. She was married to Sebastian Scheuber, a prosperous burgher.

Scheuberin disagreed with the witchhunting demonologist doctrine that was being espoused by Dominican inquisitors like Heinrich Kramer. According to Kramer's testimony, she avoided attending his sermons in Innsbruck and spoke out against them:

When asked why she asserted that [my interpretation of] Church doctrine was heretical, she responded that I had only preached against ‘unhulen’ [‘witches’] and added that I had given the method of striking a pail of milk in order to gain knowledge of a sorceress who had taken milk from cows. And when I stated that I had cited these things against them by way of censure rather than for instruction, she stated that in the future she would never attend my sermons after release. —Dominican inquisitor Heinrich Kramer

Scheuberin was also accused of having at some point passed Kramer in the street, spat and cursed him publicly: "Fie on you, you bad monk, may the falling evil take you". During the witch trial, thirteen other people were accused. Scheuberin was further accused of having used magic to murder the noble knight Jörg Spiess. The knight had been afflicted by illness, and had been warned by his Italian doctor not to keep visiting Scheuberin to avoid getting killed.

The defendants' lawyer, Johann Merwart of Wemding, raised procedural objections, which the commissary general, Christian Turner, representing Bishop Georg Golser, upheld. This included when Scheuberin's virginity at the time of her marriage was questioned, a question which she refused to answer.

The accused were released after putting up a bond to appear should the case be resumed. In the end, Scheuberin and the other six women were all either freed or received mild sentences in the form of penance. Scheuberin's witch trial was never resumed.

== Historical significance ==
The trials were overseen in part by inquisitor Heinrich Kramer, who traveled to Germany to investigate witches. The local diocese refused to honor his jurisdiction, leading Kramer to seek and receive the papal bull Summis desiderantes affectibus (1484) which reaffirmed his jurisdiction and authority as an inquisitor.

Kramer was dissatisfied with the outcome of the trials and stayed in Innsbruck to continue his investigations. Exchanged letters show Bishop of Brixen Georg Golser, whose diocese contained Innsbruck, commanding Kramer to leave the city. He eventually left after the Bishop expelled Kramer for insanity and his obsession with Helena. He returned to Cologne and wrote a treatise on witchcraft that became the Malleus Maleficarum, an instruction guide for identifying witches.

== Literature ==
- Kärfve, Eva, Den stora ondskan i Valais: den första häxförföljelsen i Europa. Stehag: B. Östlings bokförlag Symposion 1992.
- Ammann, Hartmann, Der Innsbrucker Hexenprozess von 1485, in: Ferdinandeum Zeitschrift III. Folge, 34. Heft, S. 31 ff.
- Tschaikner, Manfred, Der Innsbrucker Hexenprozess von 1485 und die Gegner des Inquisitors Heinrich Kramer: Erzherzog Sigmnund, Dr. Johannes Merwart und Bischof Georg Golser (Überarbeitete Fassung von "Hexen in Innsbruck? ...") In: Tiroler Heimat, Band 82 (2018)
