= Richard Schmidt =

Richard Schmidt may refer to:

== Sports ==
- Richard Schmidt (basketball) (born 1942), retired men's head basketball coach at the University of Tampa
- Richard Schmidt (rower) (born 1987), German rower at the 2008 and 2012 Olympics
- Richard Schmidt (fencer), German fencer; see 2018 European Fencing Championships
- Richard Schmidt (tennis) (born 1965), American tennis player
- Richard Schmidt, surfer at Mavericks, California

== Academics ==
- Richard Schmidt (linguist) (1941–2017), researcher in second-language acquisition
- Richard E. Schmidt (1865–1958), American architect of the Chicago School
- Richard Schmidt, former professor of music who taught Komitas Vardapet

== Others ==
- Richard J. Schmidt, American, first person convicted of a crime on evidence from viral DNA analysis
- Richard Schmidt (cantor) (1877–1958), German cantor and organist
- Richard Schmidt (Heer), German general and Knight's Cross recipient
- Richard Schmidt (Indologist), German scholar who worked on the Śukasaptati

== See also ==
- Richard Schmid (born 1934), American artist
- Richard Schmitz (1885–1954), mayor of Vienna, Austria
