= Praeceptorium divinae legis =

Treatise on the ten commandments, 1474

- Expositio decalogi
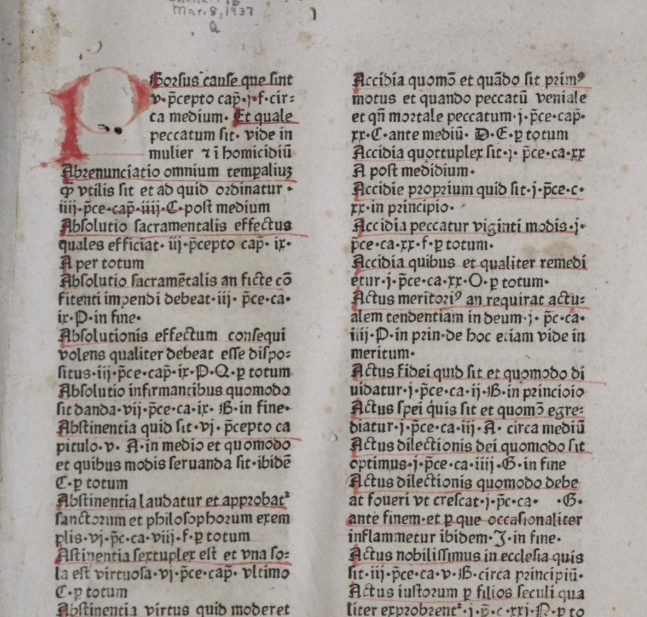
- First page of Praeceptorium divinae legis (from Boston Public Library)
- Full title: Praeceptorium divinae legis
- Also known as: Expositio decalogi
- Author(s): Johannes Nider
- Language: Latin
- Date of issue: 1474

Praeceptorium divinae legis, also known as Expositio decalogi, is a moral theology treatise written by Johannes Nider (c. 1380 – 1438). First published posthumously around 1474, this work is an exposition of the Ten Commandments, aimed at guiding Christians in ethical and spiritual living.

== Background ==
Johannes Nider was an early 15th century Dominican theologian and reformer, known for his contributions to theology and his role in the Dominican Order. He authored several works, including the Formicarius, which is considered foundational for Renaissance demonology. Praeceptorium divinae legis reflects Nider's commitment to moral reform and his crusade against vice, as he sought to address issues such as gluttony, greed, and lust through theological commentary.

== Summary of contents ==
The treatise is structured around the Ten Commandments, providing detailed explanations and moral guidance for each. Nider uses examples from scripture, historical anecdotes, and theological principles to illustrate the importance of adhering to divine law. The sixth commandment, dealing with lust and gluttony, receives particular attention, with Nider condemning excesses in pleasure and indulgence.

The text also includes discussions on related topics such as the seven deadly sins, the Twelve Articles of Faith, acts of mercy and charity. At points, it takes inspiration from works of Thomas Aquinas such as the Summa Theologica.

Nider's work was widely circulated during the late 15th century, with numerous editions printed in Cologne and Paris. Its popularity reflects its significance in shaping moral theology during this period.

== Legacy ==
On top of the other classical themes related to devotion and scripture, the book is also considered one of the first in formalizing the concept of witchcraft. It served as an inspiration to Heinrich Kramer when writing the witch-hunting manual Malleus Maleficarum.

== See also ==
- Classical theism
