= Céard =

Céard is a surname. Notable people with the surname include:

- Henry Céard (1851–1924), French novelist, poet, playwright and literary critic
- Jean Céard (1936–2025), French historian
