= Jacob Sprenger =

Dominican inquisitor and theologian (1436/1438–1495)

- Born: 1436 or 1438; Rheinfelden, Further Austria, Holy Roman Empire
- Died: 6 December 1495 (aged 57 or 59); Strasbourg, Free Imperial City of Strasbourg, Holy Roman Empire
- Other names: Jakob Sprenger
- Occupations: Inquisitor; theologian; academic
- Known for: Association with Malleus Maleficarum

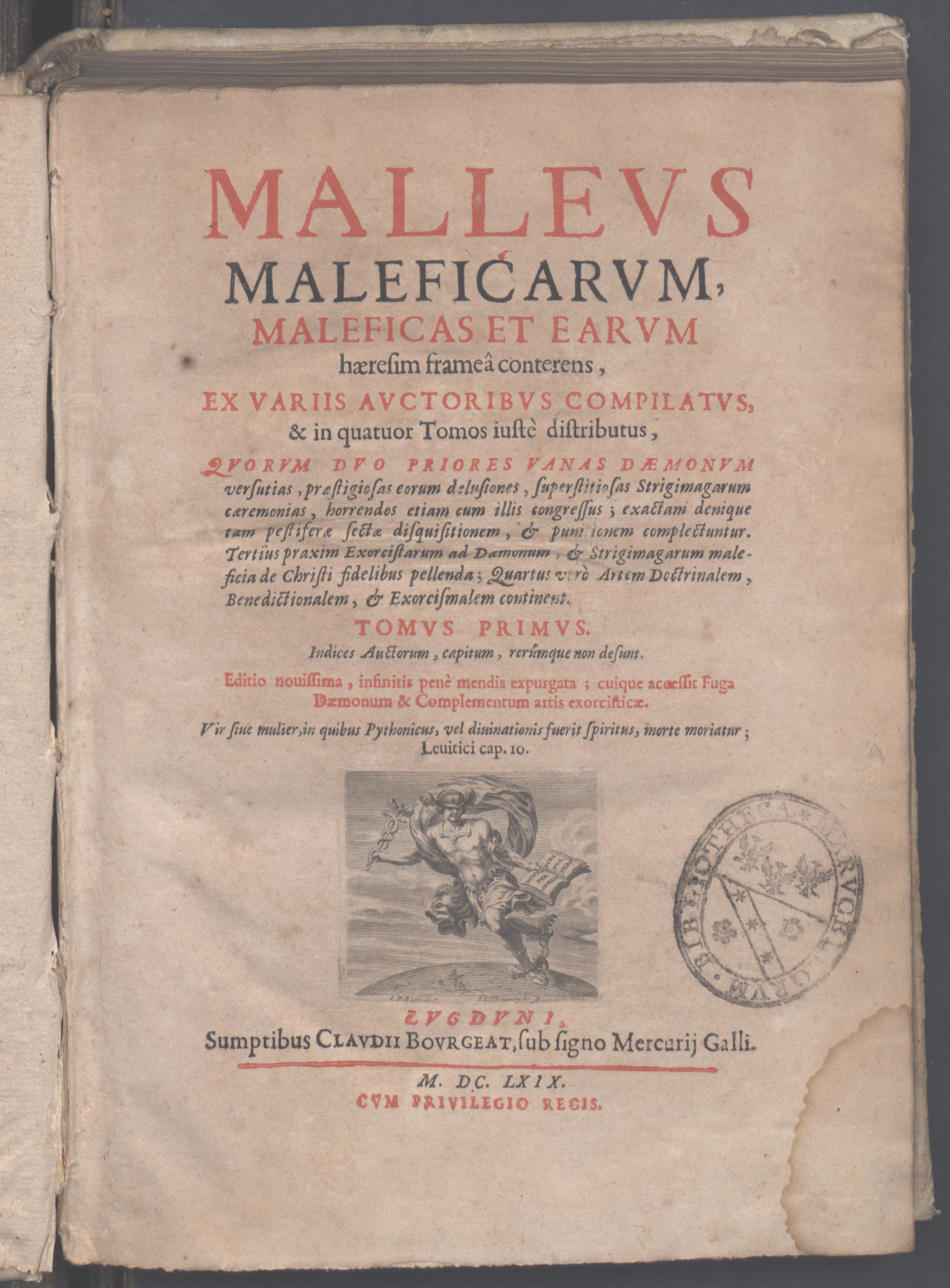
Malleus maleficarum, 1669

Jacob Sprenger (1436/1438 – 6 December 1495) was a Dominican inquisitor and theologian principally known for his association with an infamous book on witch-hunting Malleus Maleficarum (1486). He taught at the University of Cologne.

== Early life ==
Sprenger was born in 1436 or 1438 in Rheinfelden, Further Austria.

== The Dominican Order ==
=== Novice ===
Sprenger was admitted as a novice in the Dominican house of Rheinfelden in 1452 and became a zealous reformer. He founded an association of the Confraternity of the Holy Rosary in Strasbourg in 1474.

=== Theologian ===
He became a Master of Theology and then in 1480 Dean of the Faculty of Theology at the University of Cologne and was a popular lecturer.

=== Inquisitor ===
In 1481 he was appointed as an Inquisitor for the Provinces of Mainz, Trier and Cologne, a post that demanded constant traveling through an extensive district.

== Associated authorship of Malleus Maleficarum ==
Sprenger was named along with Heinrich Kramer in the 1484 papal bull Summis desiderantes of Pope Innocent VIII and reprinted in the infamous Malleus Maleficarum. All editions after 1519 named Sprenger as Heinrich Kramer's co-author.

It has been claimed that Sprenger cannot be linked to any witch trial, that his personal relationship to Kramer was acrimonious, and that Sprenger used his powerful position whenever he could to make Kramer's life and work as difficult as possible. Some scholars now believe that he became associated with the Malleus Maleficarum largely as a result of Kramer's wish to lend his book as much official authority as possible.

=== Friedrich Spee in Cologne ===
In a 1631 work most concerned with innocence, and opposed to the Malleus Maleficarum, Friedrich Spee attributes authorship of the book to "Jacob Sprenger and Heinrich Kramer." Though Spee was Jesuit (not Dominican) and his work was written more than a century after Malleus Maleficarum, both Spee and Sprenger were professors of theology in Cologne and both travelled extensively in many of the same areas. Some of Spee's fellow professors in Cologne were appalled by Spee's book and thought it should be listed on the papal Index of Forbidden Books. This would suggest that, whether or not Sprenger initially endorsed or opposed the work of Heinrich Kramer, the book carrying Sprenger's name did eventually find a degree of influence among the Catholic theologians in Cologne.

=== Salem Witch Trials ===
The Harvard President and Puritan Increase Mather cited "Sprenger" as a reference to the Malleus Maleficarum in an influential pro-witch-hunting work published in 1684, as well as another work published in 1692, the same year as the Salem Witch Trials: "Witches have often (as Sprenger observes) desired that they might stand or fall by this trial by hot iron, and sometimes come off well."

== Death ==
Sprenger died on 6 December 1495 in Strasbourg.
