= Ambrogio del Giudice =

Italian Dominican and historian

Ambrogio Del Giudice, also known as Ambrosius de Altamura or just Altamura (Altamura, November 16, 1608 – 1677), was an Italian Dominican and historian.

== Life ==
Born in Altamura, an Italian city located in the Kingdom of Naples (that is why he was called Ambrosius de Altamura or just Altamura), Ambrogio del Giudice was a member of the del Giudice family. After being ordained fray of the Dominican Order in Altamura's Dominican monastery (most likely, "Convento di San Rocco") and completing all the degrees of study available in his hometown, in 1647 he was appointed Master of the "Capitolo generale" of the Kingdom of Valencia. He was also appointed regent of Saint Dominic in the city of Andria. According to Toppi, del Giudice was probably in Rome right before his death. He died in 1677.

He is best known for his work Bibliotechae Dominicanae (1677), a kind of historical compendium of prominent personalities from the Middle Ages until the 17th century, among which many were personalities somehow related to the Dominican Order. This work was then cited and used by many subsequent historians, such as Jacques Quétif and Jacques Échard inside their work Scriptores Ordinis Praedicatorum (1721). Despite his notoriety, the above authors Quétif and Echard also noted some inaccuracies and mistakes in Ambrogio del Giudice's work. He also wrote other works, some of which have survived and are stored in a few Italian libraries. Other works such as the Chronologia, which Ambrogio del Giudice himself cites in his own Bibliotechae Dominicanae are lost; the Chronologia was not published or lost as early as the year 1753.

== Works ==
- Il Melchisedech, ovvero Lezioni in lode del SS. Sacramento dell'Eucaristia divise in tre ottave. Roma: Francesco Monica. 1653.
- Commentaria in Aristotelis Topica. Napoli: Jac. Gaffari. 1658.
- Meditazioni sopra gli misterii del SS. Rosario. Napoli: Haered Gaffari. 1659.
- Oratio in Philippi 4. Regis Catholici Funeralibus a Frat. Ambrosio de Iudice Dominicano Magistro Habita Altamurae. In D. Rocci Prope Moenia apud Fratres Praedicatores, Idibus Decembris 1666. 1666.
- Panagion, seu SS. Dominicanorum, quorum per annum ubique in ordinis Praedicatorum Eclesiis solemnia clebrantur Elogia. Pars prima. Napoli: Francesco Zannetti. 1671.
- Panagion, seu SS. Dominicanorum, quorum per annum ubique in ordinis Praedicatorum Eclesiis solemnia clebrantur Elogia. Pars altera. Napoli: Francesco Zannetti. 1671.
- Bibliotechae Dominicanae accuratiis collectionibus primo ab ordinis constitutione usque ad annum 1600 producta hoc seculari apparatu incrementum et prosecutio. Roma: Angelo Tinassio. 1677.
- Chronologia.

== See also ==
- Altamura
- Jacques Quétif
- Jacques Échard

== Bibliography ==
- Niccolò Toppi (1678). Biblioteca napoletana (in Italian). Vol. 1. Napoli: Antonio Bulifon. pp. 10, 11, 338.
- Vincenzo Maria Coronelli (1702). Biblioteca universale sacro-profana (in Italian). Vol. 2. Venezia. pp. 1163–1164.
- Jacques Quétif; Jacques Échard (1721). Scriptores Ordinis Pradedicatorum Recensiti (in Latin). Vol. 2. Ballard-Simart. pp. 660–661.
- Mazzuchelli, Giammaria (1753). Gli scrittori d'Italia (in Italian). Vol. 1. Brescia: Giambattista Rossini. pp. 523–524.
- Joseph de Viera y Clavijio (1772). Noticias de la historia generale de las Islas de Canaria (in Spanish). Vol. 1. Madrid: Blas Roman. p. 75. ISBN 9788497611336.
- Fineschi, Vincenzo (1790). Memorie istoriche degli uomini illustri (in Italian). Firenze: Gaetano Cambiagi. pp. 160, 180.
- AA.VV. (1853). Giornale arcadico di scienze, lettere ed arti (in Italian). Roma: Tipografia delle Belle Arti. pp. 75–77.
- AA.VV. (1883). British Museum Catalogue of Printed Books (ALT-AMT). London: William Clowes and Sons.
- Joseé Mariano Beristan de Souza (1816). Biblioteca Hispanoamericana Septentrional. Mexico. pp. 87, 472.
- Ludovico Antonio Muratori (1726). Rerum Italicarum Scriptores - Raccolta degli storici italiani - Dal cinquecento al millecinquecento. Vol. 9. Città di Castello: Casa editrice S. Lapi.
- Ottavio Serena (1895). I musicisti altamurani. Notizie raccolte e pubblicate da Ottavio Serena in occasione del centenario della nascita di Saverio Mercadante (in Italian). Altamura: Tipografia Fratelli Portoghese. pp. 4–6.
- Colston, Stephen Allyn (1973). Fray Diego Duran's Historia de Las Indias de Nueva Espana e islas de la Tierra firme: A Historiographical Analysis. p. 3.
- Angel D'Ors (2003). "Petrus Hispanus O.P., Auctor Summularum (III): "Petrus Alfonsi" or "Petrus Ferrandi"?". Vivarium. Vol. 41. pp. 249–303. JSTOR 41963705.
- Lorenzo Hervás y Panduro (2009). Biblioteca jesuitico-espanola II - Manuscritos hispano-portuguese en siete bibliotecas de Roma (in Spanish). Madrid. p. 235.
