= Stedelen =

Man accused of witchcraft and devil-worship

Stedelen (died c. 1400) was a man who was accused of being a witch in Boltigen, Switzerland between 1397 and 1406.

== Background ==
After the harvest had failed at his village, Stedelen was accused of using black magic to destroy the crops, killing cattle and also sacrificing a black rooster on the Sabbath at a crossroad and placing a lizard under the doorway of a local church.

Peter von Greyerz, the judge of Simmental between 1398–1406, was a firm believer in witchcraft, which he believed had been introduced in Simmental by a noble man called Scavius in 1375, who claimed he could transform himself to a mouse (as recorded in Johannes Nider's seminal work Formicarius). Scavius was slaughtered by his enemies, but he had a student, Hoppo, who, according to Greyerz, had been the tutor of Stedelen.

There are no records about Hoppo, but Stedelen from Boltigen had allegedly been made an expert on magic by Hoppo, and supposedly learned to steal manure, hay and such from others' fields to his own by magic, create hail and thunderstorms, make people and animals sterile, make horses crazy when he touched their hooves, fly, and scare those who captured him. Greyerz also accused Stedelen of having taken the milk from the cows of a married couple in order to make the wife miscarry.

== Trial ==
His trial took place in a secular court, Stedelen admitted to the charge (under torture) of summoning forth demons as part of a pact with the Devil and being part of a cult. Stedelen was burned at the stake.

Greyerz believed there existed a satanic cult, whose members swore themselves to the Devil and ate children at the churches at night. He continued his persecutions and once tortured a woman to confirm this.

== See also ==
- Deal with the Devil
- Witch trial
- Witchcraft

== Sources ==
- Eva Kärfve, "Den stora ondskan i Valais", (Swedish).
- Robbins, Rossell (1959), The Encyclopedia of Witchcraft and Demonology, Crown Publishers Inc., ISBN 0-600-01183-6
- Formicarius NIDER (Johannes) Augsburg, Anton Sorg [about 1484]; folio (An – y.9)
