= Summis desiderantes affectibus =

1484 papal bull on witchcraft

Summis desiderantes affectibus Latin for 'Desiring with supreme ardor' Papal bull of Pope Innocent VIII
- Signature date: 5 December 1484
- Subject: Witchcraft
- Text: In Latin; In English

Summis desiderantes affectibus (Latin for "desiring with supreme ardor"), sometimes abbreviated to Summis desiderantes, was a papal bull regarding witchcraft issued by Pope Innocent VIII on 5 December 1484.

== Witches and the Church ==
Belief in witchcraft is ancient. Deuteronomy 18:10–11 in the Hebrew Bible states: "Let there not be found among you anyone who immolates his son or daughter in the fire, nor a fortune-teller, soothsayer, charmer, diviner, or caster of spells, nor one who consults ghosts and spirits or seeks oracles from the dead."

Pope Gregory VII wrote to Harald III of Denmark in 1080 forbidding witches to be put to death upon presumption of their having caused storms or failure of crops or pestilence. According to Herbert Thurston, the fierce denunciation and persecution of supposed sorceresses which characterized the witchhunts of a later age were not generally found in the first thirteen hundred years of the Christian era.

According to historians such as Martin Del Rio and P.G. Maxwell-Stuart, "The early Church had set out the distinctions between white and black magic... The penalties were restricted to confession, repentance, and charitable work".

== Dominican Inquisition origin ==
The bull was written in response to the request of Dominican Inquisitor Heinrich Kramer for explicit authority to prosecute witchcraft in Germany, after he was refused assistance by the local ecclesiastical authorities, who maintained that as the letter of deputation did not specifically mention where the inquisitors may operate, they could not legally exercise their functions in their areas. The bull sought to remedy this jurisdictional dispute by specifically identifying the dioceses of Mainz, Cologne, Trier, Salzburg, and Bremen.

Innocent's Bull enacted nothing new. Its direct purpose was to ratify the powers already conferred upon Kramer (also known as "Henry Institoris") and James Sprenger to deal with witchcraft as well as heresy, and it called upon the Bishop of Strasburg (then Albert of Palatinate-Mosbach) to lend the inquisitors all possible support. Some scholars view the bull as "clearly political", motivated by jurisdictional disputes between the local German Catholic priests and clerics from the Office of the Inquisition who answered more directly to the pope.

== Content ==
The bull affirmed the existence of witches:

Many persons of both sexes, unmindful of their own salvation and straying from the Catholic Faith, have abandoned themselves to devils, incubi and succubi, and by their incantations, spells, conjurations, and other accursed charms and crafts, enormities and horrid offences, have slain infants yet in the mother's womb, as also the offspring of cattle, have blasted the produce of the earth, the grapes of the vine, the fruits of the trees, nay, men and women, beasts of burthen, herd-beasts, as well as animals of other kinds, vineyards, orchards, meadows, pasture-land, corn, wheat, and all other cereals; these wretches furthermore afflict and torment men and women, beasts of burthen, herd-beasts, as well as animals of other kinds, with terrible and piteous pains and sore diseases, both internal and external; they hinder men from performing the sexual act and women from conceiving ... they blasphemously renounce that Faith which is theirs by the Sacrament of Baptism, and at the instigation of the Enemy of Mankind they do not shrink from committing and perpetrating the foulest abominations and filthiest excesses to the deadly peril of their own souls ... the abominations and enormities in question remain unpunished not without open danger to the souls of many and peril of eternal damnation.

It gave approval for the Inquisition to proceed "correcting, imprisoning, punishing and chastising" such persons "according to their deserts". The bull essentially repeated Kramer's view that an outbreak of witchcraft and heresy had occurred in the Rhine River valley, specifically in the bishoprics of Mainz, Cologne, and Trier, as well as in Salzburg and Bremen, including accusations of certain acts.

The bull urged local authorities to cooperate with the inquisitors and threatened those who impeded their work with excommunication. Despite this threat, the bull failed to ensure that Kramer obtained the support he had hoped for, causing him to retire and to compile his views on witchcraft into his book Malleus Maleficarum, which was published in 1487. The Malleus professed, in part fraudulently, to have been approved by the University of Cologne, and it was sensational in the stigma it attached to witchcraft as a worse crime than heresy and in its notable animus against women.

Summis desiderantes affectibus was published as part of the preface of the book, implying papal approval for the work. However, Kramer's claims of approval are seen by modern scholars as misleading, and the Malleus Maleficarum received an official condemnation by the Church three years later.

The bull, which synthesized the spiritual and the secular crimes of witchcraft, is often viewed as opening the door for the witchhunts of the early modern period. However, its similarities to previous papal documents, emphasis on preaching, and lack of dogmatic pronouncement complicate this view.

== General references ==
- Black, George F. 2003. Calendar of Cases of Witchcraft in Scotland 1510 to 1727. Kessinger Publishing; ISBN 0-7661-5838-1.
- Burr, George Lincoln (1907). The witch-persecutions (PDF). The Department of History of the University of Pennsylvania: Philadelphia, Pa. (bibrec)

Published in the series: Translations and reprints from the original sources of European history; v. 3, no. 4.

- Darst, David H. (15 October 1979). "Witchcraft in Spain: The Testimony of Martín de Castañega's Treatise on Superstition and Witchcraft (1529)". Proceedings of the American Philosophical Society. 123 (5): 298–322. JSTOR 986592.
- Kors, Alan Charles; Peters, Edward (2000). Witchcraft in Europe, 400–1700: A Documentary History. Philadelphia: University of Pennsylvania Press. ISBN 0-8122-1751-9.
- Russell, Jeffery Burton (1972). Witchcraft in the Middles Ages. Ithaca, NY: Cornell University Press.
