= Heinrich Kramer =

German inquisitor (c. 1430–1505)

- Born: c. 1430; Schlettstadt, Holy Roman Empire
- Died: 1505 (aged 74–75); Kroměříž, Margraviate of Moravia
- Other name: Henricus Institoris
- Occupations: Friar, inquisitor
- Known for: Malleus Maleficarum

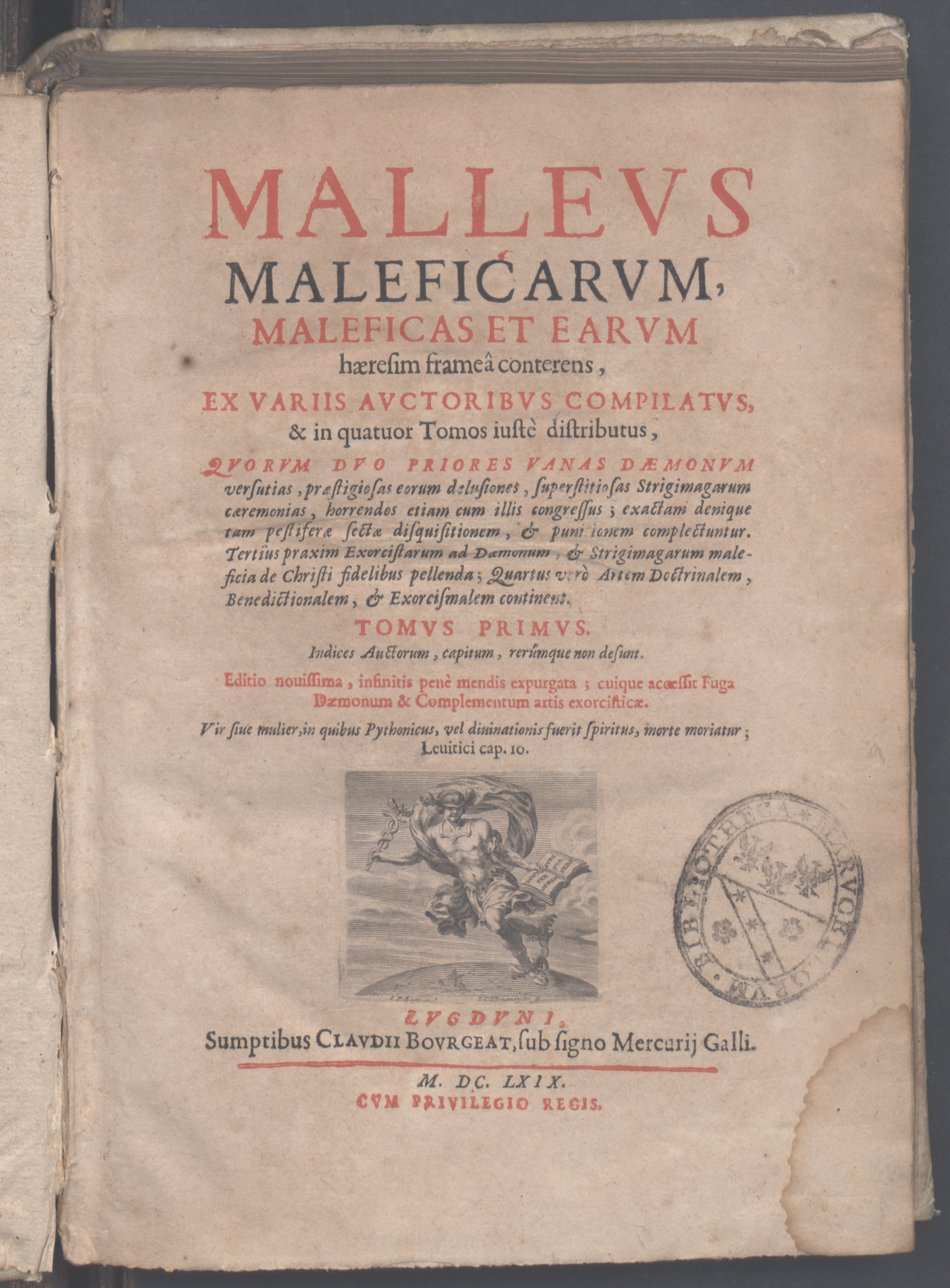
Malleus Maleficarum in a 1669 edition

Heinrich Kramer (German: [ˈkʁaːmɐ]; c. 1430 – 1505), also known under the Latinized name Henricus Institoris, (Note: Institoris is the genitive form of Latin institor and means "[son] of the shopkeeper", translating German Kramer.) was a German Dominican friar and inquisitor. With his widely distributed book Malleus Maleficarum (1487), which describes witchcraft and endorses detailed processes for the extermination of witches, he was instrumental in establishing the period of witch trials in the early modern period.

== Life ==
Born in Schlettstadt, Holy Roman Empire (now Sélestat, France), he joined the Dominican Order at an early age and while still a young man was appointed Prior of the Dominican house of his native town.

At some date before 1474 he was appointed Inquisitor for the Tyrol, Salzburg, Bohemia and Moravia. His eloquence in the pulpit and tireless activity received recognition at Rome and he was the right-hand man of the Archbishop of Salzburg.

The papal bull Summis desiderantes which Pope Innocent VIII published in 1484 acknowledges the existence of witches and explicitly empowers the inquisition to prosecute witches and sorcerers. The bull aimed to reaffirm the jurisdiction of Kramer, who was denied authority as an inquisitor in Germany.

One year later, he went to Innsbruck as the head of an inquisitorial commission with the stated intention of "bringing witches to justice". Despite being granted episcopal jurisdiction to conduct trials by Georg Golser, bishop of Brixen, the latter eventually acquired a distaste for Kramer's alleged scandals, most likely in reference to the interrogation of Helena Scheuberin in Innsbruck and six other citizens accused of witchcraft. Helena herself, married to a prosperous burgher named Sebastian, was described as an "aggressive, independent woman who was not afraid to speak her mind". Right after Kramer had arrived in the city, she had passed him in the street, spat and cursed him publicly: "Fie on you, you bad monk, may the falling evil take you". Later, it was discovered she was not attending Kramer's sermons and encouraged others to do likewise, all of which were brought against her as charges for the crime of witchcraft. Helena even disrupted one of his sermons "by loudly proclaiming that she believed Institor to be an evil man in league with the devil".

During her trial, as Kramer focused heavily on the sexuality of Scheuberin, he was accused by the bishop of having "presumed much that had not been proved". Kramer remained in Innsbruck to continue the investigation, collect evidence, and interrogate suspected witches. Golser and Kramer exchanged letters encouraging Kramer to quit the investigation, ending with a final letter in 1486 in which Golser ordered Kramer to leave his diocese, the trials in Innsbruck finally being suspended. Kramer finally relented and returned to Cologne.

In response to the Bishop's criticism, Kramer began to write a treatise on witchcraft that later became the Malleus Maleficarum (commonly translated as "The Hammer of Witches"). The bull Summis desiderantes, which gave him the authority of prosecuting and investigating cases of sorcery, was included in the forefront of the book, first published in 1487.

Kramer failed in his attempt to obtain endorsement for this work from the top theologians of the Inquisition at the Faculty of Cologne, and they condemned the book as recommending unethical and illegal procedures, as well as being inconsistent to what they perceived as the orthodox Catholic doctrines of demonology.

In the overall evaluation, his works were praised and his prestige was growing. He was asked by the Nuremberg council to provide expert consultation on the procedure of witch trial in 1491. In 1495 he was summoned by the Master General of the Order, Joaquin de Torres, O.P. to Venice and gave very popular public lectures and disputations. They were worthy of the presence and patronage of the Patriarch of Venice. He also wrote treatises Several Discourses and Various Sermons upon the Most Holy Sacrament of the Eucharist (Nuremberg, 1496); A Tract Confuting the Errors of Master Antonio degli Roselli (Venice, 1499); followed by The Shield of Defence of the Holy Roman Church Against the Picards and Waldenses which were quoted by many authors. He was appointed as papal nuncio and his assignment as inquisitor was changed to Bohemia and Moravia by Pope Alexander VI in 1500.

Summers observes that 17th-century "Dominican chroniclers, such as Quétif and Échard, number Kramer and Sprenger among the glories and heroes of their Order".

He passed his last days intensely writing and preaching until his death in Kroměříž in Moravia, in 1505.

== Major works ==
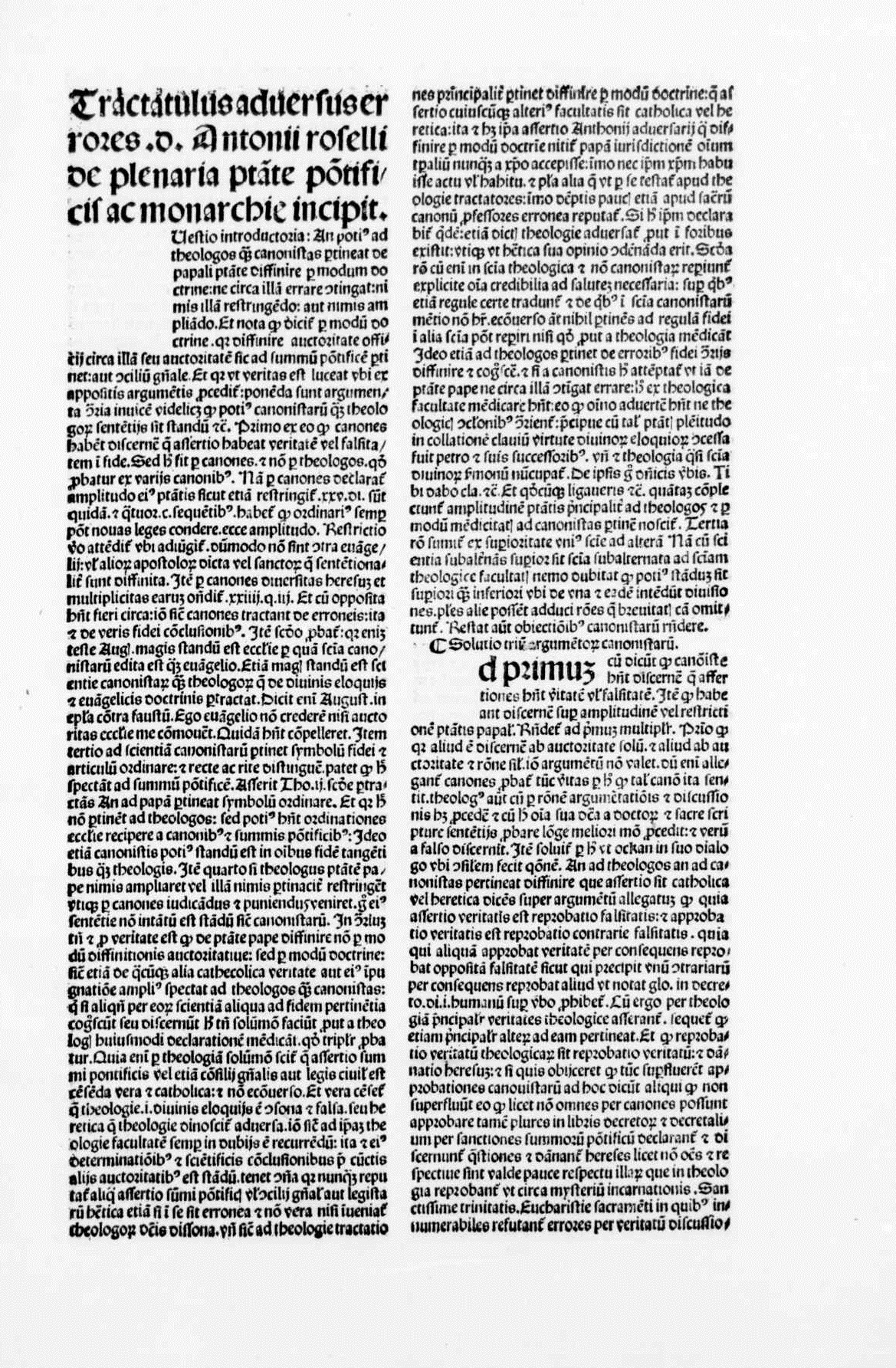
Opusculum in errores Monarchiae Antonii de Rosellis, 1499

- Malleus Maleficarum, 1487
- Several Discourses and Various Sermons upon the Most Holy Sacrament of the Eucharist, Nuremberg, 1496
- Opusculum in errores Monarchiae Antonii de Rosellis (in Latin). Venice: Hermann Liechtenstein. 1499.
- The Shield of Defence of the Holy Roman Church Against the Picards and Waldenses, c. 1500
