= Jacques Échard =

French Dominican and historian of the order

Jacques Échard OP (22 September 1644, in Rouen – 15 March 1724, in Paris) was a French Dominican and historian of the order.

== Biography ==
As the son of a wealthy official of the king he received a thorough classical and secular education. He entered the Dominican Order at Paris and distinguished himself for his assiduity in study. When Jacques Quétif, who had planned and gathered nearly one-fourth of the material for a literary history of the Dominican Order, died in 1698, Échard was commissioned to complete the work. After much labour and extensive research in most European libraries this monumental history appeared in two quarto volumes, under the title Scriptores ordinis prædicatorum recensiti, notisque historicis illustrati ad annum 1700 auctoribus. (Paris, 1721). There was a reprint: New York: Burt Franklin, 1959-61.

Besides a sketch, based chiefly on Pignon and Salanac, and a list of each writer's works, with dates and peculiarities of the various editions, Échard enumerates the unpublished, spurious, and doubtful works, with valuable indications as to their whereabouts. He displays throughout a keen, sane, and incisive criticism which has been highly praised by competent critics (Journal des Savants, LXIX, 574). A revised edition was prepared in 1908 by Rémi Coulon, O.P.

Attribution

== See also ==
- Jacques Quétif
- Ambrogio del Giudice
