= Jacques Quétif =

French Dominican and bibliographer

- Born: 6 August 1618 Paris, France
- Died: 2 March 1698 (aged 79) Paris, France
- Occupation: bibliographer, Dominican

Jacques Quétif OP (French pronunciation: [ʒak ketif]; 6 August 1618 – 2 March 1698) was a French Dominican and noted bibliographer. His major work Scriptores ordinis praedicatorum was completed by his fellow Dominican Jacques Échard.

Quétif was born in Paris. He entered the Dominican Order at the age of 17, then studied philosophy at Paris and theology at Bordeaux. In 1652, he became librarian of the Dominican convent in the rue Saint-Honoré in Paris. He maintained relations with Chancellor Séguier, who entrusted his library and choice of books to him. He was much consulted as an expert in canon law. His knowledge and his ability to write in Latin resulted in his superiors giving him the task of writing the history of the order. This work was incomplete at his death but was afterwards finished by Jacques Échard, who published it under the title Scriptores ordinis praedicatorum recensiti notis historicis et criticis illustrati auctoribus in 1719–21.

== Sources ==
- Louis-Gabriel Michaud, Biographie universelle ancienne et moderne, t. XXXIV, Paris, 1811.

== See also ==
- Ambrogio del Giudice
