= Richard Schmidt (Indologist) =

Johann Wilhelm Richard Schmidt (29 January 1866 – 15 November 1939) was a German Indologist who specialized in Sanskrit, Pāli and Marathi. He worked several Indian erotic texts and published a translation of the Kamasutra by Vatsyayana and the Ratirahasyam by Pandit Kokkoka which went into multiple editions.

Schmidt was born in Aschersleben, son of a teacher. He studied in Eisleben and went to the University of Halle where he received a doctorate in 1890 for a study of Sukasaptati under Richard Pischel and Karl Friedrich Geldner. In 1897 he translated the Kamasutra of Vatsyayana. His habilitation was in 1898 at Halle where he taught alongside Pischel and others as a private lecturer. He taught Sanskrit and lexicography at Halle. He worked as a librarian at the Deutsche Morgenländische Gesellschaft from 1904 to 1910. He spent some years teaching in Eisleben and in 1910 he moved to the University of Münster, becoming an ordinary professor in 1919. He joined the NSDAP in 1933 (member number 2492244). He added to Böhtlingk's Sanskrit dictionary. He examined the Katha tradition and had an interest in Sanskrit erotic texts. In 1902 he wrote on the love life of the Sanskrit people. In 1907 he wrote on fakirs in ancient and modern India covering yoga traditions.

His major publications include:

- 1890 Vier Erzählungen aus der Sukasaptati
- 1897 Das Kamasutram des Vatsyayana
- 1907 Fakire und Fakirtum im alten und modernen Indien
- 1919 Das alte und moderne Indien
- 1922 Beiträge zu indischen Erotik
- 1924 Elementarbuch der Saurasen
