= Formicarius =

1475 book on witchcraft by Johannes Nider

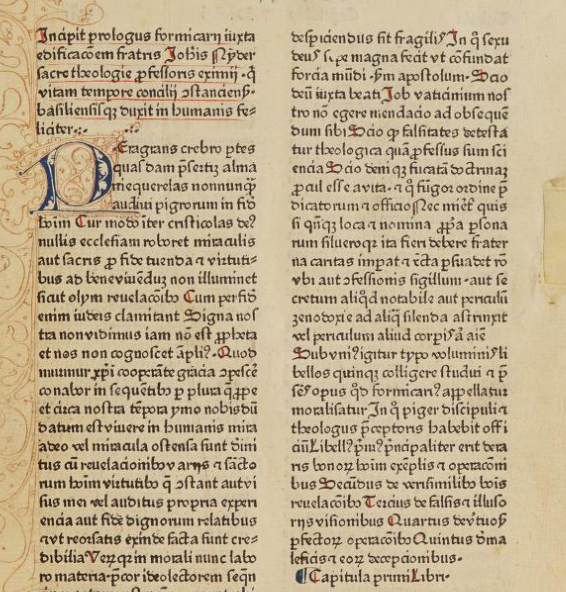
- First page of Formicarius (from George Peabody Library)
- Author(s): Johannes Nider
- Language: Latin
- Date of issue: 1475

The Formicarius, written 1436–1438 by Johannes Nider during the Council of Florence and first printed in 1475, is the second book ever printed to discuss witchcraft (the first book being Alphonso de Spina's Fortalitium Fidei). Nider dealt specifically with witchcraft in the fifth section of the book. Unlike his successors, he did not emphasize the idea of the Witches' Sabbath and was skeptical of the claim that witches could fly by night. With over 25 manuscript copies from fifteenth and early sixteenth century editions from the 1470s to 1692, the Formicarius is an important work for the study of the origins of the witch trials in Early Modern Europe, as it sheds light on their earliest phase during the first half of the 15th century.

Nider was one of the first to transform the idea of sorcery to its more modern perception of witchcraft. Prior to the fifteenth century, magic was thought to be performed by educated males who performed intricate rituals. In Nider's Formicarius, the witch is described as uneducated and more commonly female. The idea that any persons could perform acts of magic simply by devoting themselves to the devil scared people of this time and proved to be one of the many factors that led people to begin fearing magic. The idea that the magician was primarily female was also shocking to some. Nider explained that females were capable of such acts by pointing out what he considered their inferior physical, mental, and moral capacity.

The work is further of note for its information regarding notable alleged sorcerers of the time, one of whom was Scavius, who reputedly escaped his enemies on multiple occasions by metamorphosing into a mouse. Prior to his death, he was supposedly responsible for the tutelage of Stedelen in witchcraft.

The title is Latin for "the ant colony", an allusion to Proverbs 6:6. Nider used the ant colony as a metaphor for a harmonious society.

== Context ==
The Formicarius was written between 1436 and 1438, while Nider was part of the theological faculty at the University of Vienna. The stories and examples that he presents throughout the book are taken from his own experiences and from his interactions with clerical and lay authorities. Most of these accounts are representative of the late medieval religious atmosphere of what is now Switzerland, southern Germany, Austria, and the southern Rhineland. This region is also where the book was most widely read.

The Council of Florence is where Nider was exposed to many of the second-hand stories he recounts. Many of the stories relating to witchcraft take place in the Simme Valley and were told to Nider by Peter of Bern, who had conducted many witch trials in the region. French cleric Nicolas Amici told Nider an account of the trial of Joan of Arc during the council as well.

== Contents ==
The Formicarius uses a teacher–pupil dialogue as its format. The teacher is a theologian who is clearly meant to be Nider himself. The student is presented as a curious but lazy individual who is there primarily to prompt the theologian to recount contemporary stories related to the book's many themes. Every topic follows the formula of the theologian reciting biblical, patristic, or scholastic literature.

In each case, the student quickly becomes bored and asks for contemporary examples. After the theologian presents these, the student asks clarifying questions that Nider used to dispel what he saw as common misconceptions. The contemporary examples that the theologian provides draw heavily from Nider's own experience and especially from his time at the Council of Basel.

The treatise is organized according to the forms and conditions of the lives of ants. The first book focuses on the deeds of good men and women and is organized around the occupations of ants. The second book, dealing with revelations, was based on ants' varied means of locomotion. The third book examines false visions and uses the variable sizes and kinds of ants.

The fourth book deals with the virtues of saints and other holy people, using the stages of an ant's life cycle. The fifth book, on witches, is structured around the colors of ants. Additionally, each of the twelve chapters of each book was based on one of sixty conditions of ants' lives. This complex system of using ants as metaphors for various aspects of Christian belief and practice is only really addressed in the first few lines of each chapter, after which Nider focuses on whatever theme he means to address with almost no further reference to ants.

== Purpose ==
The Formicarius would have functioned as a kind of preacher's manual, with stories tailor-made for use in sermons. It is primarily meant to be used as a means for encouraging reform at all levels of Christian society. Nider used his teacher-pupil storytelling device as a means of convincing the ecclesiastical class of the validity of his points, supplying priests with stories they could spread among the laypeople, and aiding those priests in tackling common questions and misconceptions they would likely encounter. Nider, a Dominican reformer himself, intended the book to reach as wide an audience as possible through its use in popular sermons.

While the section on witches would be published later as part of the Malleus Maleficarum, Nider did not write the book as a guide on witch hunting. According to Bailey, Nider was much more focused on reform in general, which was opposed by demons, who worked their opposition through subservient witches. Nider presents reform and proper adherence to Dominican rites as the surest counter to witchcraft.

== See also ==
- Praeceptorium divinae legis
