= Johannes Nider =

German theologian (c. 1380 – 1438)

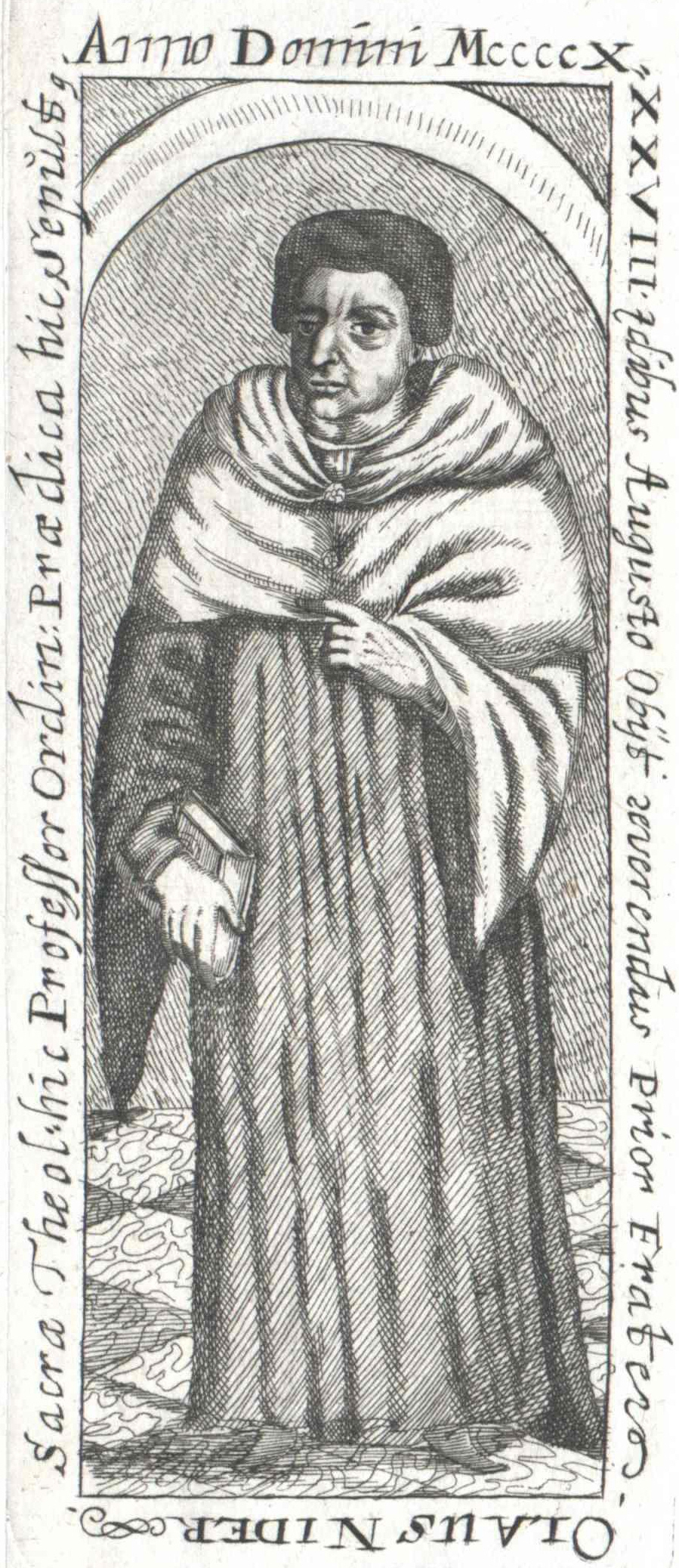
Johannes Nider

Johannes Nider (c. 1380 – 13 August 1438) was a German theologian.

== Life ==
Nider was born in Swabia. He entered the Order of Preachers at Colmar and after profession was sent to Vienna for his philosophical studies, which he finished at Cologne, where he was ordained. He gained a wide reputation in Germany as a preacher and was active at the Council of Constance. After making a study of the convents of his order of strict observance in Italy he returned to the University of Vienna, where in 1425 he began teaching as Master of Theology.

Elected prior of the Dominican convent at Nuremberg in 1427, he served as socius to his master general and succeeded Conrad of Grossis as vicar of the reformed convents of the German province. In this capacity he maintained his early reputation of reformer and in 1431 he was chosen prior of the convent of strict observance at Basel. He became identified with the Council of Basel as theologian and legate, making several embassies to the Hussites at the command of Cardinal Julian. Sent as legate of the Council to the Bohemians he succeeded in pacifying them. He journeyed to Ratisbon (1434) to effect a further reconciliation with the Bohemians and then proceeded to Vienna to continue his work of reforming the convents there. During the discussion that followed the dissolution of the Council of Basel by Pope Eugene IV, he joined the party in favour of continuing the Council in Germany; abandoning them, however, when the pope remained firm in his decision. He resumed his theological lectures at Vienna in 1436 and was twice elected dean of the university before his death. As reformer he was foremost in Germany and welcomed as such both by his own order and by the fathers of the Council of Basel. As a theologian his adherence to the principles of St. Thomas and his practical methods made him distinguished among his contemporaries. He died at Colmar.

== Writings ==
The most important among his many writings is the Formicarius, a treatise on the philosophical, theological, and social questions of his day. Book Five of the Formicarius related to witchcraft and diabolism. It recounted the experiences of Peter of Greyerz, an Inquisitor active in the regions in and around Bern in the 1390s to 1410s. Peter claimed to have interviewed a captured male witch by the name of Stedelen, who described in detail aspects of witchcraft pertaining to acts of child murder, heresy, and apostasy. The Formicarius was circulated at the Council of Basel in 1437.

Nider's work On the Contracts of Merchants, which was later one of the first works on economics to be printed, uses the language of probability to discuss the price of future goods whose present worth is uncertain. For example, he allows a merchant to sell a good in June, with payment delayed till December when the good is usually dearer, to charge the expected December price.

== See also ==
- Praeceptorium divinae legis
- Witch hunt
- Witch-hunts in Early Modern Europe
