= Hugo d'Oignies =

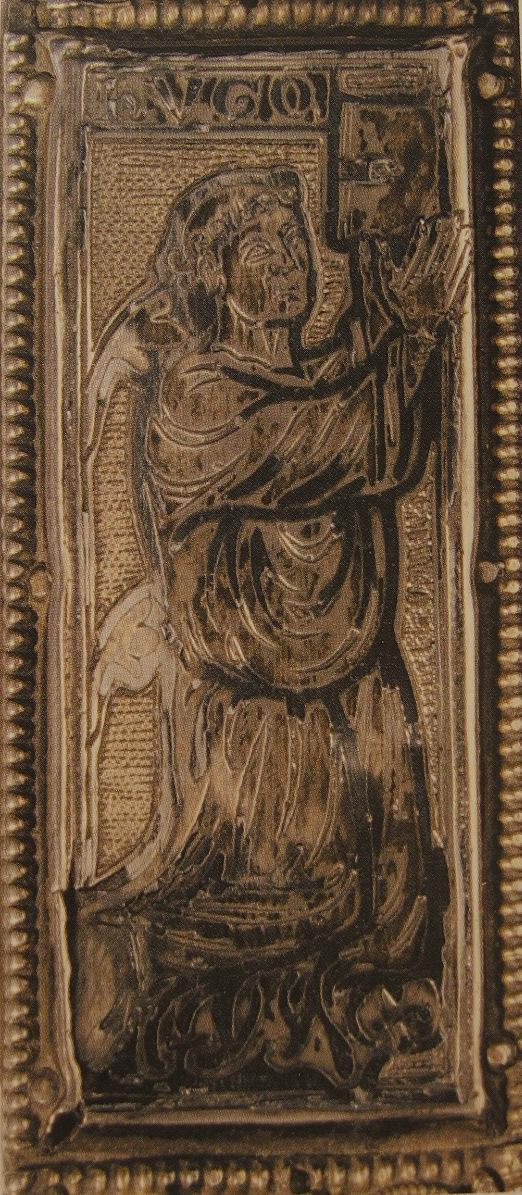
Brother Hugo of Oignies from a silver book cover he created (1228-1230)

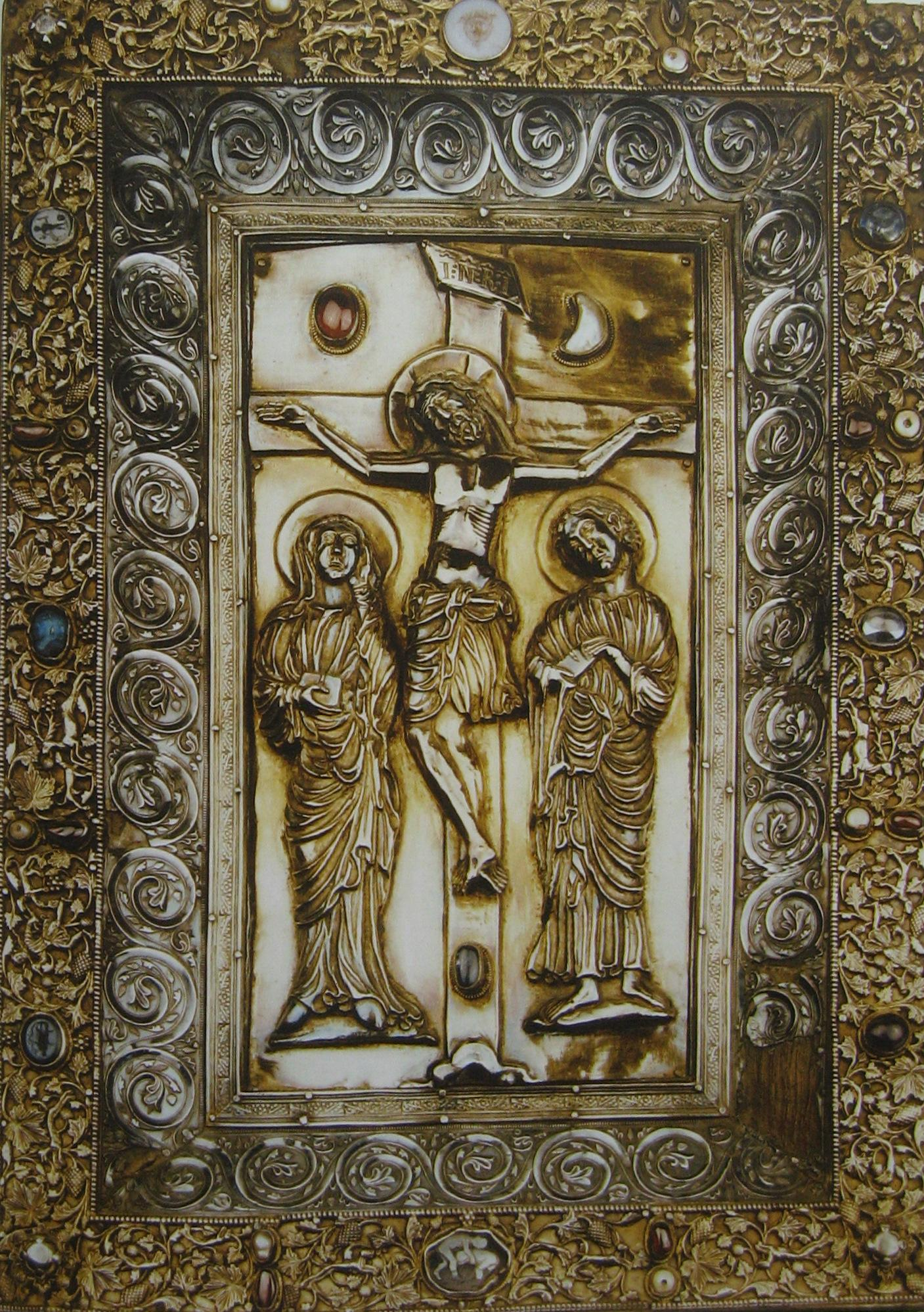
Book cover of an Evangeliary by Hugo of Oignies, 1228-1230.

Hugo of Oignies (French: Hugo d'Oignies, before 1187 in Walcourt – c. 1240 in Oignies) was a lay brother of Oignies Abbey. He was a metalworker and painter and is the last of the great jewelers of Mosan art. He is a representative of the school of the Entre-Sambre-et-Meuse and was considered the greatest artist of the Meuse Valley of his time.

== Life ==
In 1187 Hugo helped to found what became the Priory of St. Nicholas, along with his three brothers, all of whom were priests, when they moved from their native city in the County of Namur to live a monastic style of life by a small country chapel dedicated to St. Nicholas of Myra near Oignies in the Prince-Bishopric of Liège. Little is known of Hugo himself before 1228, when his works at the priory were first noted. He trained as a goldsmith, was a master scribe, and a miniaturist. He signed many of his works. In circa 1230, Hugo produced a manuscript and silver book covers for the monastery. The book cover contains depictions of Hugo and St. Nicolas, the monastery's patron saint.

During a visit to the priory in 1228 or 1229 to consecrate an altar, Jacques de Vitry, Bishop of Saint-Jean d'Acre and later cardinal, became a patron of his work. Around that time, Hugo created what are considered among his masterpieces, an Evangeliary and a reliquary. He crafted a series of pieces in silver: reliquaries, monstrances, and other objects of worship, of which three signed pieces still exist.

In his work, the human figure merges with the technical virtuosity with which the artist treats the decor's watermarks, crimping delicate cabochons. He provided works of art for the monastery. These included liturgical objects such as crosses, chalices and other religious artifacts which are considered to be masterpieces of metalwork.

== Legacy ==
When the priory was overrun and the community of canons regular scattered by forces of the French Revolutionary Army in 1796, its treasures were hidden by the last Prior of Oignies at a farm in Falisolle. After the death of the farmer, the treasure became entrusted in 1818 to the Sisters of Notre Dame de Namur, who were founded in that period. In 1939, when the Nazi invasion of Belgium at the start of World War II threatened the convent and its treasure, it was moved and escaped the destruction of the convent. After the reconstruction of the convent buildings, the treasure was returned to the Sisters, who placed it in a specially-equipped room in their convent, one of the smallest museums in the world.

In early 2010 they were moved again, this time to the Provincial Museum of Ancient Arts in Namur.

The Encyclopædia Britannica says of his contribution to Gothic metalwork, "The growing naturalism of the 13th century is notable in the work of Nicholas' follower Hugo d’Oignies, whose reliquary for the rib of St. Peter in Namur (1228) foreshadows the partly crystal reliquaries in which the freestanding relic is exposed to the view of the faithful; it is decorated with Hugo’s particularly fine filigree and enriched by naturalistic cutout leaves and little cast animals."

== Bibliography ==
- Doumont, Danièle. Le fabuleux trésor d'Hugo d'Oignies, l'une des sept merveilles de Belgique exposée à Namur, Mémoires, La Lettre mensuelle, 2003
- Collet, Emmanuel. Le trésor d'Oignies, King Baudouin Foundation, 2012, ISBN 978-2-87212-666-8
