= Thomas of Cantimpré =

Belgian theologian (1201–1272)

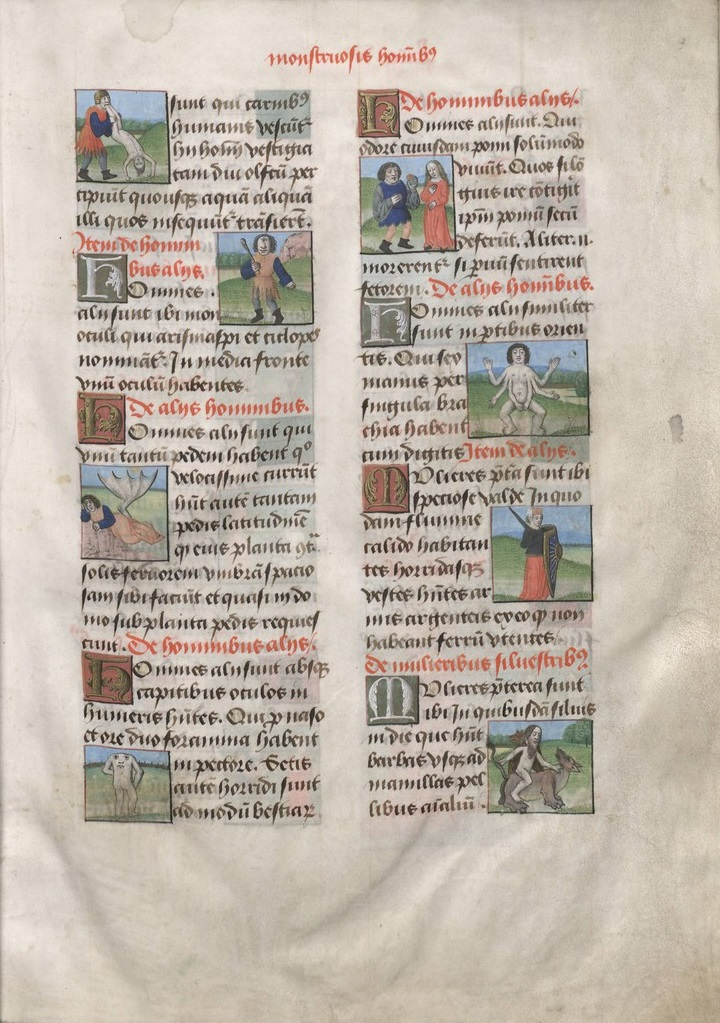
15th-century illuminated manuscript of Thomas of Cantimpré's De rerum natura. Sheet showing 'monstruous human beings' such as cannibals.

Thomas of Cantimpré (Latin: Thomas Cantimpratensis or Thomas Cantipratensis) (Sint-Pieters-Leeuw, 1201 – Louvain, 15 May 1272) was a Flemish Catholic medieval writer, preacher, theologian and a friar belonging to the Dominican Order. He is best known for his encyclopedic work on nature De natura rerum, for the moral text Bonum universale de Apibus and for his hagiographical writings.

== Biography ==
Thomas of Cantimpré was born of noble parentage in 1201, at Sint-Pieters-Leeuw (a small town near Brussels), in the Duchy of Brabant.

In 1206 his father (returning from Palestine, where he had fought alongside Richard I of England) sent Thomas to Liège, where he began to tackle the difficulties of the trivium and quadrivium, studying from age 5 to age 11; in Liège he also had the chance to meet Jacques de Vitry, who was preaching there.

In 1217, at the age of 16, he entered the Canons Regular of St. Augustine at the Abbey of Cantimpré, near Cambrai, where he was later ordained a priest. He was to spend fifteen years at Cantimpré, a constant source of edification for his brethren.

Later, in 1232, Thomas of Cantimpré entered the Dominican Order in Leuven (again in the Brabant), and in 1233 was sent by the Order to Cologne, so that he could pursue advanced theological studies: here, Thomas had the opportunity to study and make progress under the direction Albertus Magnus.

After 4 years in Cologne, Thomas was sent to Paris for further scholarly studies at the Dominican studium of Saint-Jacques, in preparation for his preaching mission.

By 1240, he had returned to Louvain, where he was appointed Magister of philosophy and theology, a charge he exercised with great distinction. In 1246, still at Louvain, he became subprior and lector.

The last part of his life was dedicated to preaching and he undertook missions throughout the Brabant, Germany, Belgium and France: for his great success in this field, Thomas was also honored with the title of "Preacher General".

Thomas of Cantimpré died in Leuven, supposedly on 15 May 1272.

== Writings ==
Thomas of Cantimpré was the author of several works of different types, all written in Latin.

Among his hagiographical works are the Vita Joannis abbatis primi monasterii Cantimpratensis, a Supplementum ad vitam Mariae Oigniacensis, as well as three lives dedicated to holy women belonging to the Diocese of Liège, namely, the Vita S. Christinae virginis Mirabilis dictae, Vita preclare virginis Margarete de Ypris, and Vita Piae Lutgardiae.

The Hymnus de beato Jordano is a 105-line work written in honor of the blessed Jordan of Saxony (died 1237), a key figure of the Dominican Order.

=== De natura rerum ===
One of Thomas' most significant works is 'De natura rerum' (or Liber de natura rerum), a work of natural history to which he dedicated almost twenty years of labour, between 1225 and 1244. The text had the greatest diffusion of all his writings, on account of both the large number of surviving manuscripts, as well as the many references made to it by later authors.

=== Bonum universale de apibus ===
Thomas of Cantimpré was also the author of the Bonum universale de apibus, a work of moral and spiritual edification – composed between 1256/57 and 1263, but probably around 1259 – which is based on the allegory of life in a community of bees to deal with issues related to moral conduct and to the duties of superiors and subordinates.

The Bonum universale de apibus is organized in two books: the first one (De prelatis) deals with the "prelates" (bishops, abbots and other high-ranking clergy), while the second one (De subditis) deals with subordinates (both monks and laity). Each chapter presents at the beginning the exposition of a property of bees, followed by an allegorical interpretation of a moral kind and then by a series of exempla. While the passages on bees and allegorical interpretations are taken (as the author himself recounts) from 'other books', Thomas takes up the matter of each exemplum "from his own experience or from contemporary oral, religious or secular sources". Overall, the text therefore represents "a treatise on practical theology and morals".

Like the De natura rerum, the Bonum universale had great fortune: the manuscript tradition is prolific, more than a hundred manuscripts. There were made also several prints: a print in Deventer before 1478, then one in Paris and three more (1597, 1605, 1627) in Douai. The text has also inspired many writers during the centuries, including Johannes Nider, who took inspiration from the Bonum universale for the structure of his Formicarius (1436–1438).

The Bonum universale de apibus subsequently had wide resonance also because it contains (in the paragraph Cur Iudaei Christianum sanguinem effundant quotannis) the first systematic theorizing of the antisemitic so-called 'Blood Accusation', accusing Jews of the ritual murder of Christians. In an attempt to understand the reason behind these purported rituals, Thomas concocts a theory that since the killing of Christ the Jews suffered from bleeding, as per the mob's cry to Pilate "May his blood be on us and on our children" (Mt 27:25), thus the Jews supposedly killed Christians, and then used their blood in rituals, believing, says Thomas, that in this way they could heal themselves. In fact, he claimed, they had erroneously interpreted to the letter the indication of one of their prophets that "only Christian blood could alleviate this sorrow", when in reality the prophecy figuratively referred to the blood of Christ (only sanguine Christiano), symbolically drunk during the Eucharist: the only good for the Jews would therefore have been conversion to the true faith. Thomas says he learned about this from an unspecified "converted Jew", probably referring to Nicholas Donin.

Within the Bonum universale Thomas also mentions the blasphemous theory of the three impostors, according to which the founders of the three great religions – Moses, Jesus and Muhammad – would "subdue the world with their sects and their teachings: [...] Moses deceived the Jews, Jesus the Christians and Mohammed the Gentiles". Thomas of Cantimpré attributes this idea to the theologian Simon of Tournai (or Simon de Tornaco, as Thomas calls him), a master of theology at the University of Paris who, he claims, deserved (for having said that) an epileptic crisis that made him mute.

=== Hagiographical Works ===
Thomas of Cantimpré is also the author of various hagiographical texts, for which he is considered one of the first great authors of mystical hagiography.

With the exception of Vita Joannis abbatis primi monasterii Cantimpratensis – composed between 1224 and 1228 and relating to the founder and first abbot of the abbey of Cantimpré – Thomas writes mystical biographies on holy women, all linked to the territory of modern Belgium.

His mystic hagiographical works therefore represent a corpus of texts, composed roughly between 1231 and 1248, which appears as "a florilegium of lives of the holy women living around Liège": through this set of hagiographic works, Thomas of Cantimpré offers "a mirror of the complexity and fluidity of the forms of religious life of the diocese of Liège". It is also possible to analyze in detail the individual works that make up this hagiographical dossier.

==== Supplementum ad vitam Mariae Oigniacensis ====
The first hagiographical work by Thomas was actually a Supplementum, to the Life of Mary of Oignies, written in 1215 by Jacques de Vitry regarding the figure of Marie of Oignies.

Thomas writes the Supplementum ad vitam Mariae Oigniacensis around 1230 at the specific request of the community of Oignies (or rather "forced by the prior of Oignies"), who wanted to promote – thanks to the authorship of Thomas – its image.

In addition to being Thomas's first work on a holy woman, the Supplementum is also one of the first written records of life in a Beguine community. Marie of Oignies is in fact one of the most famous beguines: she belonged to those "small republics of semi-religious women [...] protected but together controlled by the ecclesiastical authorities [...] for the creativity of their religious and devotional practices".

Moreover, in the story that he tells of the life of Marie, Thomas shows that he was deeply impressed by her, so much so that he considered her as a teacher. With this c work, he aims at proposing an ideal of Christian life: under the emblem of Marie of Oignies, in fact, the author seeks to convey how "evil is not identifiable only in infidels and heretics, but it nestles in the hearts and in the very bosom of Christianitas".

==== Vita S. Christinae virginis Mirabilis dictae ====
Thomas of Cantimpré wrote his first 'autonomous' hagiography, even if it is already his second female portrait (after that of Marie of Oignies), on the life of Christina of St. Trond, a Belgian mystic (died 1224) known as Christina the Astonishing: Thomas writes the work around 1232 starting from direct testimonies of those who had known the saint. In the figure of Christina, he again sought to represent an ideal, in this case an "extreme and rarefaction model of perfection, [which] reproposes, after a millennial pause, the mystical horizons of holy madness".

The 'historical' value of this Life is profoundly doubtful (as can be seen also from the comparison with the information that Jacques de Vitry gives on Christina in the Prologue of the aforementioned Vita B. Mariae Oigniensis) but on the literary level for this type of texts does not count so much the 'historical' truth, but rather the model of sanctity that emerges from the work.

==== Vita preclare virginis Margarete de Ypris ====
The Vita preclare virginis Margarete de Ypris (or Vita Beatae Margaritae Iprensis) is the second "autonomous" mystical hagiography of Thomas, dedicated to the life of Margaret of Ypres, A Belgian Blessed who died in 1237.

The Vita Margaritae was composed on commission by the Dominican preacher Sigieri da Lilla certainly before 1244, but probably long before that year: in fact, the tone of the story gives a "feeling of proximity and immediacy".

From the impression that is given in the work, it is clear that through the figure of Margeret Thomas sought to propose an ideal of feminine devotion according to the Dominican vision; in the Life dedicated to her, in fact, Margaret represents the evidence that "female perfection is expressed in silence, in prayer and in submission". We do not want to propose a need for isolation: the blessed is indeed – again coherently with the Dominican ideals – deeply "tied to the new reality of the presence of the Preachers in cities".

Here Thomas of Cantimpré clearly expresses the Dominican conception of the centrality of the female presence, which "has an irreplaceable value for the success of the mission", just as stated, in the same years, by the "Master General of the Order Jordan of Saxony".

==== Vita Piae Lutgardiae ====
The Thomas' hagiographical masterpiece is certainly the Vita Piae Lutgardiae (or Vita Lutgardis), a work "far more elaborate and complete than the previous texts", It is the life of Lutgardis of Tongres, who died in 1246 and later became the saint patron of Flanders. Thomas wrote the work in 1248, but later reworked it in 1254–1255.

Unlike the two previous Vitae, linked to figures of secular penitents, with the Vita Lutgardis Thomas set out to portray of a Cistercian nun of Aywières: it is therefore "a cloistered portrait", that the author uses to explain "the mystical meaning of the enclosure, [...] atopic space in which it is possible to live the encounter with God in radical terms".

== Editions and translations ==
=== Modern editions ===
- Boese Helmut (ed.), Liber de natura rerum, Berlin-New York, Walter de Gruyter, 1973.
- Julia Burkhardt (ed.), Das Bonum universale de apibus de Thomas von Cantimpré als Gemeinschaftsentwurf: Analyse, Edition, Übersetzung, Kommentar, Teilband 2: Edition, Übersetzung un Kommentar, Schnell & Steiner, 2020.
- George ColveneerR (ed.), Bonum universale de apibus, Bellerus, 1597.
- AA.SS., Hymnus de beato Jordano, Februarii tomus II, februarii XIII, Parigi-Roma, 1867, pp. 739–740.
- Robert Godding (ed.), Une œuvre inédite de Thomas de Cantimpré: la «Vita Ioannis Cantipratensis» in «Revue d’histoire ecclésiastique», LXXVI, 1981, pp. 241–316.
- Robert B.C. Huygens (ed.), Iacobus de Vitriaco, Vita Marie de Oignies. Thomas Cantipratensis, Supplementum, Turnhout, Brepols, 2012 (Corpus christianorum. Continuatio mediaevalis, 252).
- AA.SS., Vita sanctae Christinae mirabilis, Iulii tomus V, iulii XXIV, Parigi-Roma, 1867, pp. 650–660.
- Giles Meersseman (ed.), Les frères Prêcheurs et le mouvement dévot en Flandre au XIII^{e} siècle, in «Archivium Fratrum Praedicatorum», XVIII, 1948, pp. 69–130, pp. 106–130.
- AA.SS., Vita piae Lutgardis, Iunii tomus IV, Iunii XVI, Paris-Roma, 1867, pp. 187–210.

=== Translations ===
- Margot H. King, Thomas de Cantimpré. The Life of Christina the Astonishing, Toronto, Peregrina Publishing, 1999.
- Barbara Newman (cur.), Thomas of Cantimpré: The Collected Saints' Lives: Abbot John of Cantimpré, Christina the Astonishing, Margaret of Ypres, and Lutgard of Aywières, Turnhout, Brepols, 2008 (Medieval Women: Texts and Contexts, 19).
- Henri Platelle (cur.), Thomas de Cantimpré. Les exemples du «Livre des abeilles». Une vision médiévale, Turnhout, Brepols, 1997.
- André Wankenne (cur.), Thomas de Cantimpré. Vie de Sainte Ludgarde, Namur, Presses Universitaires de Namur, 1991.
