= Christina the Astonishing =

Christian holy-woman born in Brustem

Blessed Christina the Astonishing
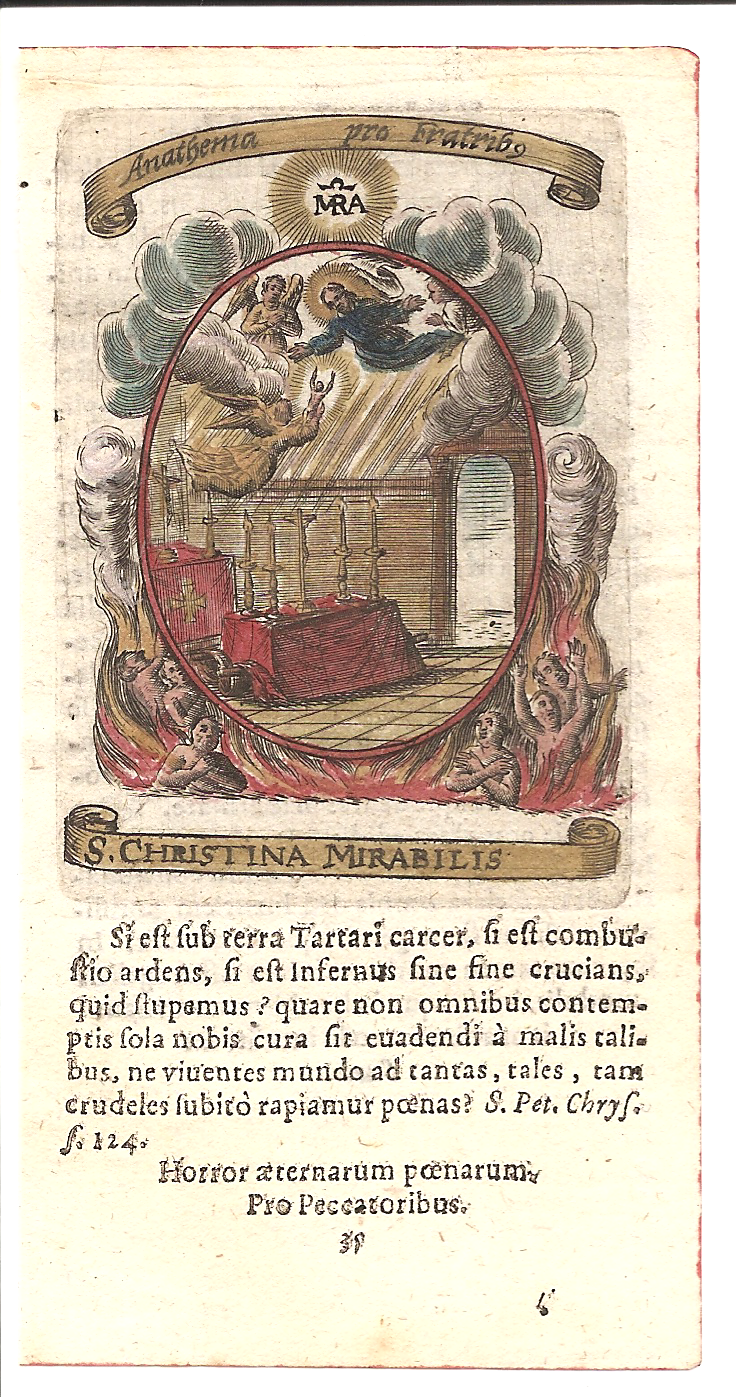
- Christina the Astonishing appearing in the 1630 Fasti Mariani calendar of saints – feast day 24 July (front of card)
- Born: 1150; Brustem, County of Loon
- Died: 1224; Sint-Truiden, County of Loon
- Venerated in: Catholic Church
- Feast: 24 July
- Patronage: Millers, people with mental disorders, mental health workers

Christina the Astonishing (c. 1150 – c. 1224), also known as Christina Mirabilis, was a Christian holy woman born in Brustem (near Sint-Truiden), Belgium. Christina is primarily known for her legendary resurrection during her funeral mass, and numerous other miracles attributed to her during her life. Thomas of Cantimpré wrote a hagiography of her based on accounts from people who knew her, which made her known outside of Sint-Truiden.

== Life ==
Christina was born to a religious family, the youngest of three daughters. After being orphaned at the age of fifteen, she worked taking the herds to pasture. She suffered a massive seizure when she was in her early twenties. Her condition was so severe that witnesses assumed she had died. A funeral was held, but during the service, "she arose full of vigor, stupefying with amazement the whole city of Sint-Truiden, which had witnessed this wonder. She levitated up to the rafters, later explaining that she could not bear the smell of the sinful people there."

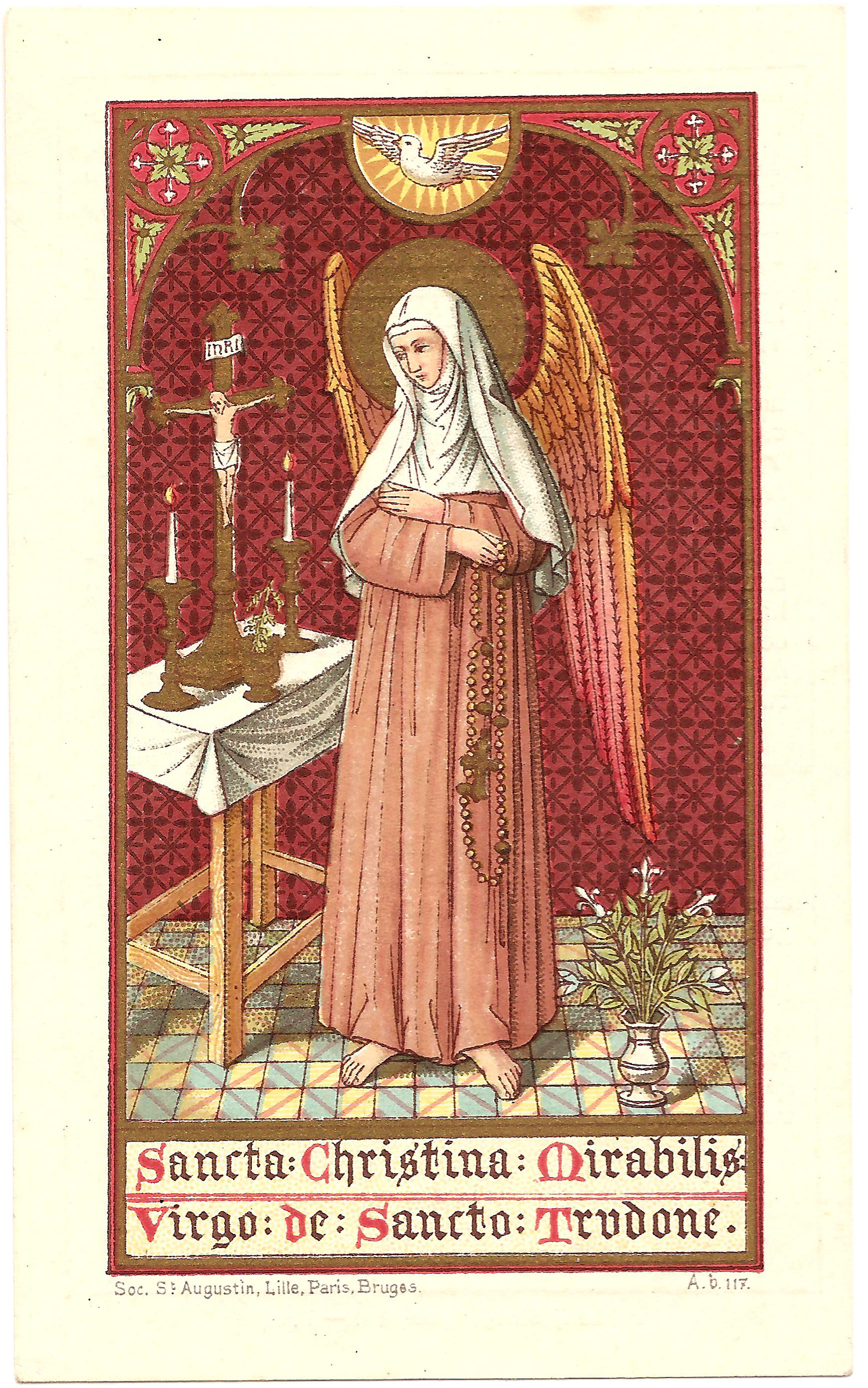
Saint Christina the Astonishing (Mirabilis) front of prayer card from 1892 confirming by the Bishop Victor-Josephus that her relics were at the time cared for by the Redemptorists and that her Feast day was 24 July.

She related that she had witnessed Heaven, Hell and Purgatory. She said that as soon as her soul was separated from her body, angels conducted it to a very gloomy place, entirely filled with souls enduring such torments that it was impossible to describe them. She claimed that she had been offered a choice of either remaining in heaven or returning to earth to perform penance in order to deliver souls from the flames of Purgatory. Christina agreed to return to life and in that instant stood up. She told those around her that she had returned to life for the sole purpose of bringing relief to the departed and conversion to sinners.

Christina renounced all of life's comforts, reduced herself to extreme destitution, dressed in rags, lived without home or hearth, and not content with these privations eagerly sought out all that could cause her suffering. At first, she fled human contact and, suspected of being possessed, was jailed. Upon her release, she took up the practice of extreme penance.

Thomas of Cantimpré, then a canon regular who was a professor of theology, wrote a report eight years after her death, based on the accounts of those who knew her.

"We have", wrote St Robert Bellarmine, "reason for believing his testimony, since he has for guarantee another grave author, Jacques de Vitry, Bishop and Cardinal, and because he relates what happened in his own time, and even in the province where he lived. Besides, the sufferings of this admirable virgin were not hidden. Everyone could see that she was in the midst of the flames without being consumed, and covered with wounds, every trace of which disappeared a few moments afterwards. But more than this was the marvellous life she led for forty-two years after she was raised from the dead, God clearly showing that the wonders wrought in her by virtue from on high. The striking conversions which she effected, and the evident miracles which occurred after her death, manifestly proved the finger of God, and the truth of that which, after her resurrection, she had revealed concerning the other life."

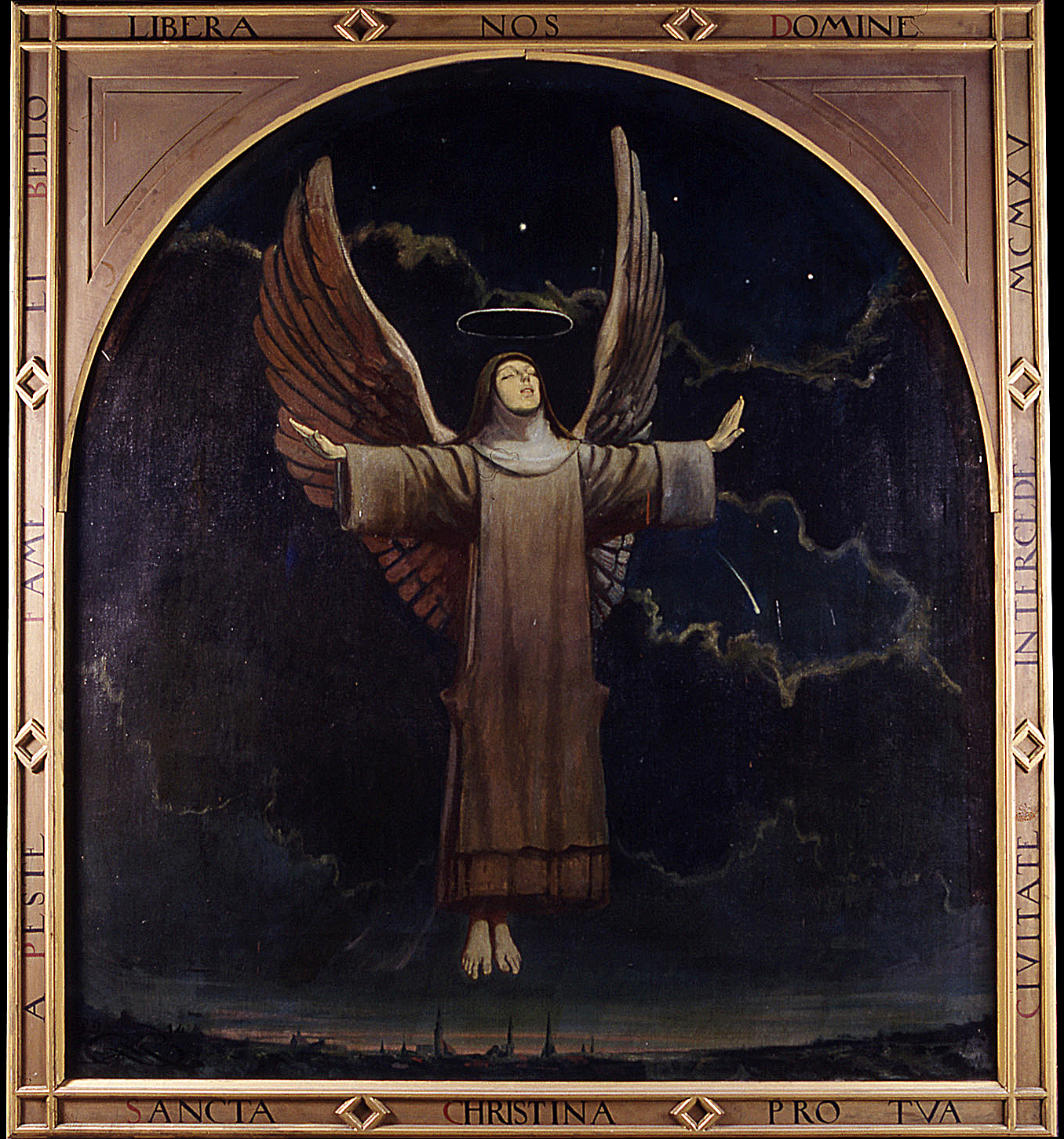
Saint Christina the Astonishing (Mirabilis) church photo with a caption reading "In pestilence, famine, and war, deliver us Lord – Saint Christina for your community intercede".

Thus, argues Bellarmine, "God willed to silence those libertines who make open profession of believing in nothing, and who have the audacity to ask in scorn, Who has returned from the other world? Who has ever seen the torments of Hell or Purgatory? Behold two witnesses. They assure us that they have seen them and that they are dreadful. What follows, then, if not that the incredulous is inexcusable, and that those who believe and nevertheless neglect to do penance are still more to be condemned?"

The reference was to Cardinal Jacques de Vitry, who met her and recounted that she would throw herself into burning furnaces and there suffer great tortures for extended times, uttering frightful cries, yet coming forth with no sign of burns upon her. In winter she would plunge into the frozen Meuse River for hours and even days and weeks at a time, all the while praying to God and imploring his mercy. She sometimes allowed herself to be carried by the currents downriver to a mill where the wheel "whirled her round in a manner frightful to behold", yet she never suffered any dislocations or broken bones. She was chased by dogs which bit her.

After being jailed a second time, upon her release she moderated her approach somewhat. Christina died at the Dominican Convent of Saint Catherine in Sint-Truiden, of natural causes, aged 74. The prioress there later testified that, despite her behaviour, Christina would humbly and fully obey any command given her by the prioress.

In his commentaries to a new edition of the Latin text, the French historian Sylvain Piron suggests that she was only about 12 at the time of her apparent death. Her birth should rather be placed around 1170 than 1150.

== Legacy and veneration ==
Christina the Astonishing has been venerated as a saint since the 12th century, and her cult was subsequently recognised locally and she was included in the calendars of at least two Catholic bishops in the 17th and 19th centuries. The Fasti Mariani of 1630, for example, records her among the saints. She was never formally beatified or canonised by the Catholic Church. Nevertheless, she is included in the current edition of the Roman Martyrology under 24 July, where she is described as "Blessed Christina, known as the Astonishing". She continues to be venerated as a saint in local tradition, especially in her native region of Limburg. Prayers are traditionally said to Christina to seek her intercession for millers, for those suffering from mental illness, and for mental health workers.

== Cultural references ==
- Christina's story inspired the Nick Cave song "Christina the Astonishing", from the album Henry's Dream.
- Poets Jane Draycott and Lesley Saunders re-told her story in their collection Christina the Astonishing.
- Christina is the subject of a school pageant in an episode of the Showtime television series, Nurse Jackie; the episode is titled "The Astonishing".
- Kirstin Valdez Quade wrote a short story called "Christina the Astonishing (1150-1224)", published by The New Yorker on their website on July 24, 2017, the 793rd anniversary of Christina's death.
- Christina appears in B.R. Yeager's 2020 novel Negative Space about necromancy and teen suicide, published by Apocalypse Party.

== See also ==
- Lutgardis
- List of Catholic saints
