= Oignies Abbey =

Former Augustinian monastery in Aiseau-Presles, Wallonia, Belgium

Coordinates: 50°25′30″N 4°35′59″E

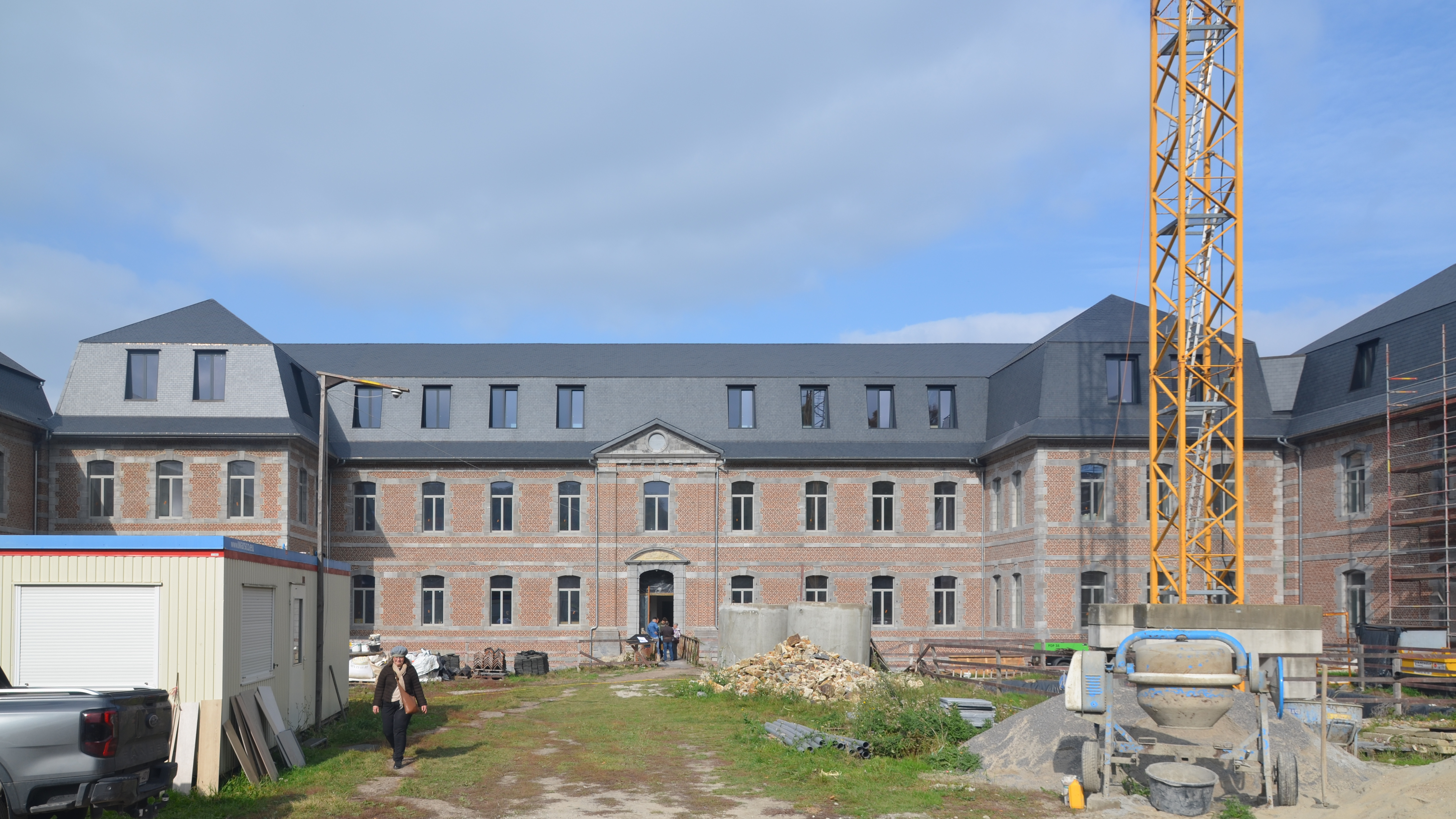
Oignies Abbey in 2025

Oignies Abbey (French: Abbaye d'Oignies; originally Priory of St Nicolas d'Oignies) is a former Augustinian monastery in Aiseau-Presles, Wallonia. Established in 1187, it is situated on the banks of the Sambre River in Belgium.

== Origin ==
In 1187, four brothers from Walcourt settled at Oignies, Three of the brothers, Gilles, Robert and John, were priests, while the fourth, Hugo, was a jeweller and metalworker. Several other men settled with them and they formed the community of St. Nicolas of Oignies, adopting the rule of St. Augustine. In 1192, St Nicolas of Oignies was officially recognized as a priory by the order of the Canons of St. Augustine. Gilles becomes the first prior, a position that he held for 41 years. The community built a church dedicated to St. Nicolas, which was consecrated in 1204. Following major alterations it was reconsecrated in 1226. In circa 1230, Hugo presented to the monastery a manuscript and silver book covers, the book cover depicting Hugo as a layman, and the monastery's patron saint St. Nicolas.

The women of this group settled in huts between the men's priory and the river. Marie of Oignies left her husband and arrived here in the first decade of the thirteenth century where she ran a community of Beguines. Soon after, the cleric Jacques de Vitry arrived, and it was he who chronicled Marie's life after he became a priest. Hugo's medieval Gothic art pieces are recognized as "some of the most important examples of medieval Gothic metalwork".

== History ==
Though the priory remained a community of 12 to 20 men, it eventually became an Augustinian monastery. Between the thirteenth and sixteenth centuries there were several fires. The wars in the southern Netherlands also caused destruction. In 1559, during the ecclesiastical reorganization of southern Netherlands, St Nicolas priory church became a part of the newly established Roman Catholic Diocese of Namur. It was suppressed in 1796. As with other monasteries, the priory's land parcels were sold and became public property. John Francis Pierlot, also known by his religious name Brother Gregory, was a native of Soignies and the 42nd and last prior of the abbey. In 1794, during the revolution, he left the Treasure of Hugo d'Oignies with a farmer and his wife in Falisolle, to prevent its confiscation by the state. In 1817, following the death of the farmer, it was retrieved from its hiding place, returning to the care of Father Pierlot. In 1818, he gave the Treasure to the Sisters of Notre Dame at Namur. After the revolution, however, some members of the religious community remained until 1808. In 1836, the new owner demolished the cloister. Some of the church furniture went to parish churches in the area, such as Saint Christopher (Charleroi) or St. Maarten (Ragnies). A statue of the Virgin from medieval times is now at the Metropolitan Museum of Art in New York City. Situated on 3 hectares in a park-like setting, the building is now privately owned and can be rented for events such as seminars, conventions, and weddings.
