= De natura rerum (Cantimpré) =

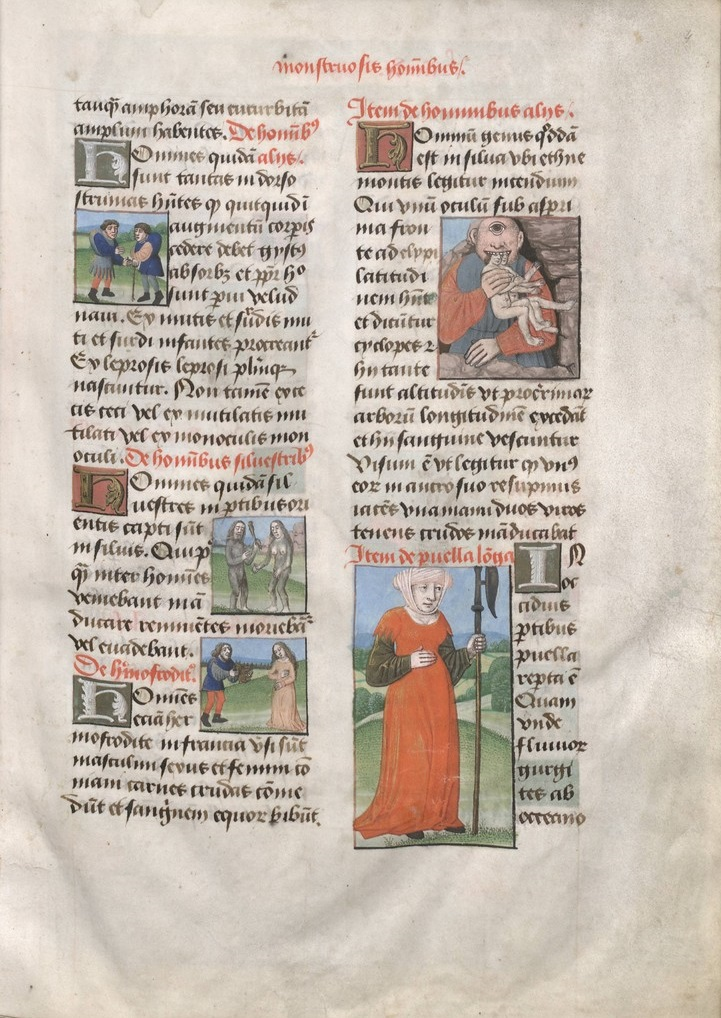
- A page from De natura rerum, ms. 411, Bruges Public Library, fol. 4r.
- Author: Thomas of Cantimpré
- Subject: Natural history, anatomy, biology, mineralogy, medicine
- Publication place: Flanders

De natura rerum (or Liber de natura rerum) is a thirteenth-century work of natural history, written by Flemish Roman Catholic friar and medieval writer. Thomas of Cantimpré. De natura rerum may be Thomas' most significant work, as it's both the one he dedicated more time to (almost twenty years of work, between 1225 and 1244) and the one that had the largest posthumous fortune, as witnessed by the large number of codices that contain this work, but also by the many authors that took inspiration from it.

== Contents ==
De natura rerum is an encyclopedic work – thus belonging to the encyclopedic genre, largely widespread on the Latin Late Middle Ages – that wants to represent a complete and exhaustive compendium of the previous scientific history, specifically for clergy.

A first 'stable' redaction of the work is dated between 1237 and 1240 (as to say, in the period when Thomas is located at the Dominica studium in Paris) and it's structured into nineteen books. Later, anyway, the author himself deeply revises the text, adding many interpolations to it: this second redaction of De natura rerum, dated 1244, is organized into twenty book, of different topics:

=== Outline ===
- Book I: on human body's anatomy;
- Book II: on the soul;
- Book III: on the "monstrous men" of the East;
- Book IV: on quadrupeds animals;
- Book V: on birds;
- Book VI: on sea monsters;
- Book VII: on sea creatures;
- Book VIII: on snakes;
- Book IX: on worms;
- Book X: on common trees;
- Book XI: on aromatic and medicinal trees;
- Book XII: on aromatica and medicinal's trees properties;
- Book XIII: on sources;
- Book XIV: on precious stones;
- Book XV: on the seven metals;
- Book XVI: on the seven celestial regions;
- Book XVII: on the sphere and the seven planets;
- Book XVIII: on air motions;
- Book XIX: on the four elements;
- Book XX: on eclipses and sidereal motions.

== Sources ==
Thomas of Cantimpré's De natura rerum depends on several sources, that include in primis the great philosopher Aristotle (a fundamental authority in the Middle Ages, particularly starting from XIII century) and two Latin authors, Pliny the Elder and Gaius Julius Solinus, respectively of the I and the III century. Other names shall be added to these three, for instance St. Ambrose and – coming chronologically closer to Thomas – also the one of Jacques de Vitry. Furthermore, the twentieth book (added in a second moment, as previously said), majorly comes from William of Conches's De philosophia mundi. In this work, Thomas himself also indicates an anonymous 'experimenter'. Apart from the few names easily identifiable, it's certain that Thomas of Cantimpré used a large number of different sources, that are not always easy to recognize.

== Reception and textual tradition ==
As previously mentioned, the De natura rerum had a considerable fortune, especially during the Renaissance, when the text was frequently plagiarized, mostly for catalogs of animals, but also for catalogs of stones and monsters. Several vernacularizations and also a Dutch translation (Der Naturen Bloeme by Jacob van Maerlant) were realized. Furthermore, Conrad of Megenberg's Buch der Natur (1475) was also inspired by Thomas' De natura rerum.

Regarding the textual tradition, De natura rerum had a widespread diffusion, confirmed by the consistent number of codes that contain the text. However, to be more specific, between the hundred of manuscripts of the work, only a few (just two manuscripts) contain the whole work in its integrity, while the largest part of them has a shortened version: thus, the shorter the version of the De natura rerum, the larger diffusion it had.
