= Margaret of Ypres =

Flemish visionary and ascetic

Margaret of Ypres (1216–1237) was a Flemish visionary, ascetic, penitent and flagellant. She was one of a number of 13th century lay women who led devout lives, following the example of Marie of Oignies. Called mulieres religiosae or mulieres sanctae, some gathered together in beguinages while many others lived at home practicing voluntary poverty, chastity, prayer, fasting and penance, a lifestyle known as the vita apostolica in imitation of Christ. In Margaret's time, such Dominican female penitents were unregulated by the Church and were under the guidance of individual spiritual advisers. A rule would not be established until Munio of Zamora’s Rule of the Brothers and Sisters of Penance of the Blessed Dominic (Regula Fratrum et Sororum Ordinis de Paenitentiae Beati Dominici) in the late 13th century.

== Life ==
Information on Margaret comes from a biography, The Life of Margaret Ypres by Thomas of Cantimpré written in 1240. Margaret was born in Ypres into a well-off middle-class family. Her father died when she was four and Margaret, with her mother and three sisters, went to live with an uncle. She showed a predilection for a holy life from a young age. While attending a local convent school, she smelled a wonderful odor on first beholding the host and begged the Abbess to be allowed to partake of the Eucharist with the nuns. From the age of seven she began severe fasting and practiced self-mortification by stuffing stinging nettles and burrs down the front of her dress. By age ten she was tearing her flesh with thorns to experience the torment of Christ.

After the death of her uncle when she was 18, she turned to the Dominican Friar Zegher from Lille as her spiritual director, who encouraged her in her devotions. About this time she was attracted to a young man, but quelled her feelings and made a vow of chastity. She retreated entirely from the world and spent her days in constant prayer, even, although she rarely spoke, praying when in conversation with her mother and sisters. To avoid the temptation of men, she had her mother dismiss a twelve-year-old boy who was helping in the household.

Margaret slept little, often due to severe headaches, ate little, kept frequent vigils, engaged in long periods of fasting and continued her self-mortification. She wore ragged clothing and would go out begging until Zegher made her stop. Any money she received from begging she gave to the lepers. Margaret had visions of Christ and of the Virgin Mary and felt angels holding her up when her austerities left her too weak to stand. Many miracles were attributed to Margaret, such as making whole some smashed eggs so the family would have something to eat, and saving her sister who was on the point of death during childbirth.

Her austere lifestyle took a toll on her health and she was eventually bedridden, experiencing great pain, fevers and convulsions, all of which tribulations she bore with grace. After lingering for a year, she died aged 21.

== See also ==
- Marie of Oignies
- Beguines and Beghards
