= List of protected heritage sites in Aiseau-Presles =

This table shows an overview of the protected heritage sites in the Walloon town Aiseau-Presles. This list is part of Belgium's national heritage.

Object	Year/architect	Town/section	Address	Coordinates	Number^{?}	Image
Priory ^{(nl)} ^{(fr)}		Aiseau-Presles		50.425065°N 4.599570°E	52074-CLT-0001-01 Info	
Roman tower and remains Pont-de-Loup ^{(nl)} ^{(fr)}		Aiseau-Presles		50.418391°N 4.543865°E	52074-CLT-0002-01 Info	
Roman tower and protection zone ^{(nl)} ^{(fr)}		Aiseau-Presles		50.418192°N 4.543616°E	52074-CLT-0003-01 Info	
Wooded area of Brou and Stembier ^{(nl)} ^{(fr)}		Aiseau-Presles		50.406195°N 4.556614°E	52074-CLT-0004-01 Info	
Part of castle park with ossuary ^{(nl)} ^{(fr)}		Aiseau-Presles		50.401363°N 4.576205°E	52074-CLT-0005-01 Info	
Coal mine "Le Panama" ^{(nl)} ^{(fr)}		Aiseau-Presles		50.415240°N 4.568238°E	52074-CLT-0006-01 Info	

== See also ==
- List of protected heritage sites in Hainaut (province)
- Aiseau-Presles
