= Pont-de-Loup =

Section of Aiseau-Presles, Wallonia, Belgium

- Interactive map of Pont-de-Loup
- Coordinates: 50°24′N 04°33′E
- Country: Belgium
- Region: Wallonia
- Province: Hainaut
- Municipality: Aiseau-Presles
- Website: www.aiseau-presles.be

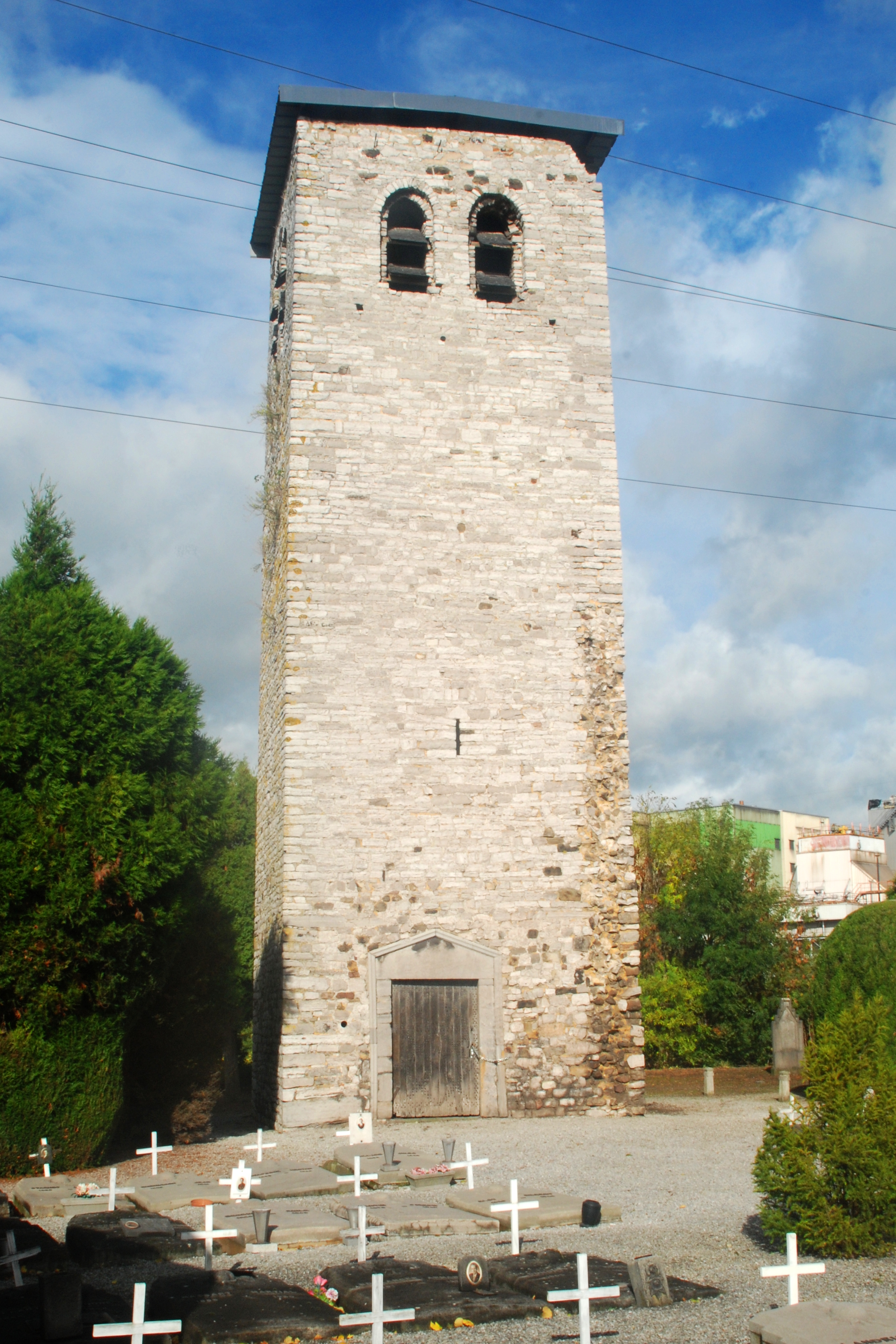

Pont-de-Loup (French pronunciation: [pɔ̃ də lu]; Walloon: Pondlô) is a village of Wallonia and a district of the municipality of Aiseau-Presles, located in the province of Hainaut, Belgium.

The residents of Pont-de-Loup are referred to as "Lupipontain(e)." The village is officially a "lieu dit" ("named place") in the commune of Tourrettes-sur-Loup.. The village is best known for an annual religious festival in honor of Our Lady Del Manock. Our Lady of Manock is the subject of veneration for pilgrims hoping to invoke the saint's miraculous healing of deafness. Every year in August, a procession is held along with the feast day for the patron church of Saint-Clèt.

The village is nestled in a bend of the River Sambre.

== History ==
Pont-de-Loup was once part of a huge estate ceded to Eckhard in 840 A.D. by Louis the Pious . He was a lord at the time in Wallonia, in the province of Hainaut. Today, it is part of the municipality of Aiseau-Presles.

== Etymology ==
Possible etymology: from 'fundus' (Latin) for estate and '-lo(o)' from wood (Germanic lauha, marisk (Frankish language)-> du marais (French) -> marsh (English)

=== Old forms ===
Year	Name
840	Funderlo
1143	Ponderlous
1162	Pondrelos
1230	Ponderlues
1232	Podreluez
1235	Pondreluez
1238	Pondrelouz
1250	Pondreluz
1265	Pondrelos
1385	Pondeslous
1398	Pondrelous
1408	Pondralous
1420	Pondelour
1423	Ponderlou
1426	Pontdreloux
1438	Pondelou
1462	Pont de Loup
1491	Pondreloux
1599	Pontdreloup
1625	Pondeloup
1628	Pondeloux
1737	Pon de loup
1750 onwards	Pont-de-Loup

== Also known as ==
Baty, Champs Saint-Clèt (French The fields around the Church of Saint-Clèt), Joncquière, Malfait, Monts, Wairchat.

== The cult "Notre Dame Del Manock" ==
The Blessed Mary of Del Manock was mentioned for the first time in 1358. It is claimed that Mary was a local virgin, who attracted many deaf suppliants and healed them of their deafness.

=== Information from The Royal Society of History "Le Vieux Châtelet" website ===
Every year on the last Sunday of August, the village of Pont-de-Loup holds a procession of Our Lady Del Manock at a pilgrimage founded in her honor. It is also an important feast day for the patron church of Saint-Clèt. The procession in Pont-de-Loup is unique because of the presence of the group representing Our Lady of Manock, the local Virgin and pilgrims gather in the hopes of invoking the healing of deafness. The procession and pilgrimage are combined together in one large procession for the Blessed Notre Dame faithful and pilgrims.

The beginning of the celebration is marked by everyone attending Mass. During the service, many people gather outside the square, as the church is too small to accommodate all. After Mass, the procession forms at the church. It is led by a local group of around one hundred men called the "Walkers of Saint-Eloi" who march in time to pipes and drums. The procession proceeds around the first quarter of the church, and then onward to the river Sambre, finally stopping at the entrance of a narrow path which leads to the fountain of Our Lady Del Manock. This is the most essential part of the pilgrimage. Once arriving at the fountain, the afflicted drink the clear water which is deemed to be a miraculous cure for deafness. Since World War II, this religious procession has been the most striking attraction of this village.

== Sport ==
Pont-de-Loup has a football club known as A.S.B.L. Sporting Pont-de-Loup; and a basketball club, known as the Royal Eclairs.

== Landmark sites ==
- The Church of Saint Clèt
- Unité de Valorisation Energétique (UVE) de Pont-de-Loup
