= Marie of Oignies =

Beguine saint

Blessed Marie of Oignies
- Born: 1177; Nivelles, Belgium
- Died: 23 June, 1213 (aged 35–36); Oignies, Belgium
- Venerated in: Catholic Church
- Major shrine: Church of Saint Nicholas at Nivelles, Belgium
- Feast: 23 June
- Attributes: Protected from rain by the Virgin Mary sheltering her with her mantle
- Patronage: Against fever, women in labour

Marie of Oignies (Maria Ogniacensis, born Nivelles, now Belgium, 1177, died 1213) was a Beguine saint, known from the Life written by James of Vitry for Bishop Fulk of Toulouse.

Marie "did not live a cloistered life following an approved rule, but rather adopted a free form of devout life marked by strenuous asceticism and manual labour, as well as mystical gifts of a new kind." Marie is purported to have received many visions from God, experienced ecstasy and wept uncontrollably when meditating on the Passion of Christ. She did not eat meat, dressed in white clothes, and mortified her flesh in acts of penance.

Her life was recorded as early as 1215 by her confessor, Jacques de Vitry. His account helped gain papal approval for the Beguines.

== Biography ==
=== Youth ===
Marie was born into a family of wealth in the Liège diocese of Nivelles (in modern-day Belgium) in 1176. Her parents dressed her in elegant clothing, suitable for nobility; however, Marie became distraught by the extravagant luxury. She recalled scripture specifically referencing the offenses of 1 Peter 3:3 and 1 Timothy 2:9, which chastise one for wearing costly attire. From a young age, Marie was attracted to the monastic life and was mocked by her parents for being such a serious and pious child. She sequestered herself from other children, preferring the solitude of prayer. The vowed religious of the Cistercian order greatly captivated her attention as they traveled by her home.

=== Marriage ===
Marie was married at the age of fourteen to Jean de Nivelle, as a way for her parents to discourage her deep spiritual interests. This marriage and freedom from her mother and father was a pivotal point for Marie's spirituality – she became engulfed in a deeper passion for expressing her spirituality. In addition to emotional sacrifice of prayer and meditation, part of her devotion included physical punishment. Such pains she inflicted were sleep deprivation, sleeping on wooden planks, and wearing a tight rope around her midsection. Her belief was that the physical body was not her own and she was made to emulate a similar experience of torture that the crucified Christ endured. Because she believed she was preserved to be God's handmaiden, she beseeched her new husband to take a vow of chastity. In his devotion, Jean reciprocated the promise of celibacy. Marie later encountered a vision that promised "compensation for matrimony" as a reward for this celibate and childless arrangement. Following her privileged upbringing, Marie resisted a life of luxury with her husband and subsequently sought a life of poverty. Together, they nursed lepers.

=== Death ===
Marie declared that she was given a gift of special unity with the body of Christ. The unique part of this union was that she could recognize the difference between consecrated and unconsecrated hosts. She vowed to eat only consecrated wafers, as the unconsecrated bread made her ill. At the time of her death, at age 35, her body was found to be terribly emaciated.

=== Beatification ===
Marie of Oignies is beatified in the Catholic Church. Her feast day is 23 June.

== Beguine life and spirituality ==
Marie began a semi-religious life, not as a nun, but a beguine by convincing her husband to join her in deep prayer and dedication to charitable work with the lepers of Willambroux. The number of followers to Marie's way grew. Her work and faithful devotion inspired other young women to join her in the quaint community to live the rule of Francis. As some beguines later were known, Marie was one of the earliest known female spiritual directors. News of her work and spirituality spread rapidly and reached France, where theology student Jacques de Vitry heard of her. He met Marie in 1208. Although he was her confessor, de Vitry sought Marie as his own guide through his faith journey. He ultimately referred to her as his spiritual mother and would remain with Marie throughout her life, writing a hagiography of her life around 1215. Later, Thomas of Cantimpre wrote a combined, expanded work on Jacques de Vitry and Marie of Oignies.

=== Prayer ===
Chapter IX of de Vitry's hagiography indicates Marie was constantly in prayer, regardless of any activity in which she was engaged. Every action and every word, de Vitry reports, was accomplished through prayer. She also made regular habit of genuflection to the Lady at the church of St. Mary of Oignies – during a single instance for up to one thousand one hundred repetitions in a forty-day period of deep prayer. Her prayer was believed to be effective in dealing with the Devil. It is reported that, by making the sign of the cross, she could sweep away the evil spirit.

=== Miracles ===
Marie was reported as having performed other miracles. Thomas of Cantimpre writes of her visions, prophecies, and miraculous healing powers, both during her lifetime and posthumously.

- Thomas reports of a prediction Marie envisioned of Jacques de Vitry (Bishop Jacques). She foresaw that he would be sent as a prelate to a location across the sea, and she forewarned him not to resist the Lord's will. Her prediction was accurate, as the election took place and de Vitry was, indeed, called to this remote region.
- Another account describes a time Marie offered a relic of her own hair to a man suffering an illness. By accepting the hair, this man received healing.
- Another encounter describes Marie and others as having been saved by John the Evangelist during a severe storm. As she was traveling with a group of people, the storm began to bear down near them. In a plea for mercy, Marie prayed to be spared from the storm. Her traveling companions were astonished that the storm raged all around them, yet they did not receive a single drop of rain upon themselves. Marie's prayer of thanksgiving was that all persons who witnessed that divine miracle be spared from any scruple of unbelief.
- As relics were of high value, particularly in the medieval age, Marie was intent to preserve her body strictly for sacred use after her death. Before she died, Marie heard of a particular man who had pulled the teeth of a deceased holy man. Trembling, she rebuked this man, pleading that he would not do the same to her. She stated she would clench her teeth, even in death, so that he would not be able to pull out her teeth. The man persisted, indicating that she would surely die before he would. He maintained that he would indeed obtain her teeth and proceeded to mock her. After Marie died, the man attempted to wrench her teeth from her jaw, but could not, as her jaw was clenched shut. The man tried and tried, yet only after he broke down in astonishment and prayed for mercy, then did her jaw open and the skull shook out several teeth.

=== Fasting ===
Cautious not to be indulgent in food and drink, Marie consumed very little. De Vitry reports that her meals were exceptionally meager, consisting of no meat or wine and very little fish. She primarily ate a vegetarian diet, but in scant quantities. She preferred to eat bread that was so old and hardened that it would injure the soft tissue of her mouth and cause her to bleed. This symbolism of bread and blood was desirable to Marie, as it represented the Eucharistic sacrifice of Christ in which she herself was taking part.

=== Devotion ===
Chapter V of De Vitry's hagiography discusses in detail the pain in which she felt for the crucified Christ. As she was in worship during the end of Holy Week, she envisioned the reality of the Passion. De Vitry writes of this compunction and constant flowing of her tears for several days as a gift that exemplified her compassion and unity with Christ.

=== Clothing ===
Marie's piety made her despise elegant clothing, and she had peculiarities about her wardrobe choices. Her preference for simplicity in clothing revealed her devotion to living a life which is not of this world. She often wore a white tunic, symbolic of her baptism; her clothes were coarse, like John the Baptist's. She made a concerted effort not to wear too new clothing, nor too ragged, for the image that could be projected at either extreme was unfavorable.

=== Seven Gifts of the Holy Spirit ===
Jacques de Vitry records seven specific virtues as revealed to Marie of Oignies. These are examples of the Gifts of the Holy Spirit she encountered in her visions.

- The spirit of the fear of the Lord – Although she understood 1 John 4:18, "perfect love casts out fear", it was her concern that she did not act accordingly enough. She was driven to appreciate the minutiae of creation.
- The spirit of piety – "Because the righteous handmaid of Christ entirely overflowed with a profound loving-kindness toward those who were being tortured in purgatory, she was not content with her own prayers and she obtained many intercessors from the prayers and Masses of other people."
- The spirit of knowledge – She had visions during the Eucharist. At the Elevation of the Host, she could differentiate between worthy and unworthy recipients by the descending of a spirit or host of spirits. Those who are worthy would have the spirit remain with them; those unworthy would bring emptiness to that person's soul.
- The spirit of fortitude – Marie's patience grew from her piety of self-deprivation. She understood her trials and tribulations as something special which had been given to her as a gift from the Lord.
- The spirit of counsel – Marie was well sought for her wise counsel as a result of her ability to prophesy about others. One such friend, Hadewijch, found great comfort in Marie's vision of her temptations.
- The spirit of understanding – The ability of "knowing the [unspoken] thoughts of men" was another gift of Marie. She knew when a priest said a Mass in her honor without hearing his intention.
- The spirit of wisdom – Marie was visited by the saint on his or her day of celebration. These saints brought others, but she clearly could identify each saint.
