= Aiseau-Presles =

Municipality in Hainaut Province, Wallonia, Belgium

Aiseau-Presles Åjhô-Préle (Walloon)
- Municipality
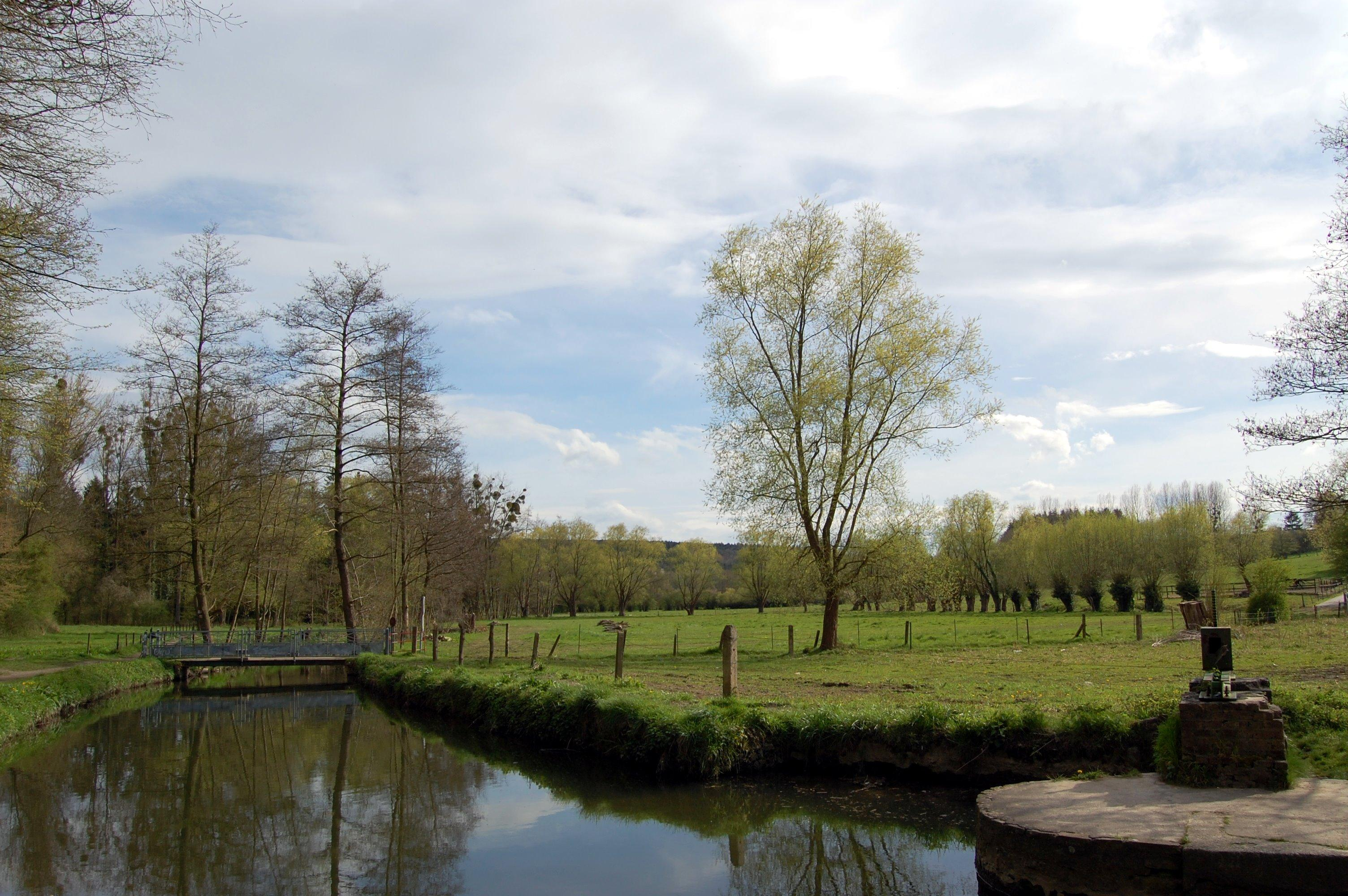

- Flag Coat of arms

- Location of Aiseau-Presles in Hainaut
- Interactive map of Aiseau-Presles
- Location in Belgium
- Coordinates: 50°25′N 04°34′E
- Country: Belgium
- Community: French Community
- Region: Wallonia
- Province: Hainaut
- Arrondissement: Charleroi

Government
  - Mayor: Jean Fersini (PS)
  - Governing party: PS

Area
  - Total: 22.42 km^{2} (8.66 sq mi)

Population (2018-01-01)
  - Total: 10,788
  - Density: 481.2/km^{2} (1,246/sq mi)
- Postal codes: 6250
- NIS code: 52074
- Area codes: 071
- Website: www.aiseau-presles.be

Aiseau-Presles (French pronunciation: [ezo pʁɛl]; Walloon: Åjhô-Préle) is a municipality of Wallonia located in the province of Hainaut, Belgium.

On 1 January 2018 Aiseau-Presles had a total population of 10,788. The total area is 22.19 km^{2} which gives a population density of 486 inhabitants per km^{2}. It is located in the arrondissement of Charleroi. Its postal area is: 6250.

Cities and municipalities bordering: Châtelet - Farciennes - Fosses-la-Ville - Gerpinnes - Sambreville.

== Districts ==
- Aiseau
- Pont-de-Loup
- Presles
- Roselies

== Landmarks ==
- Oignies Abbey

== Demographics ==
Historical population:

- 1977: 10,969
- 1994: 10,912
