= Falisolle =

Falisolle Farjole (Walloon)
- Village
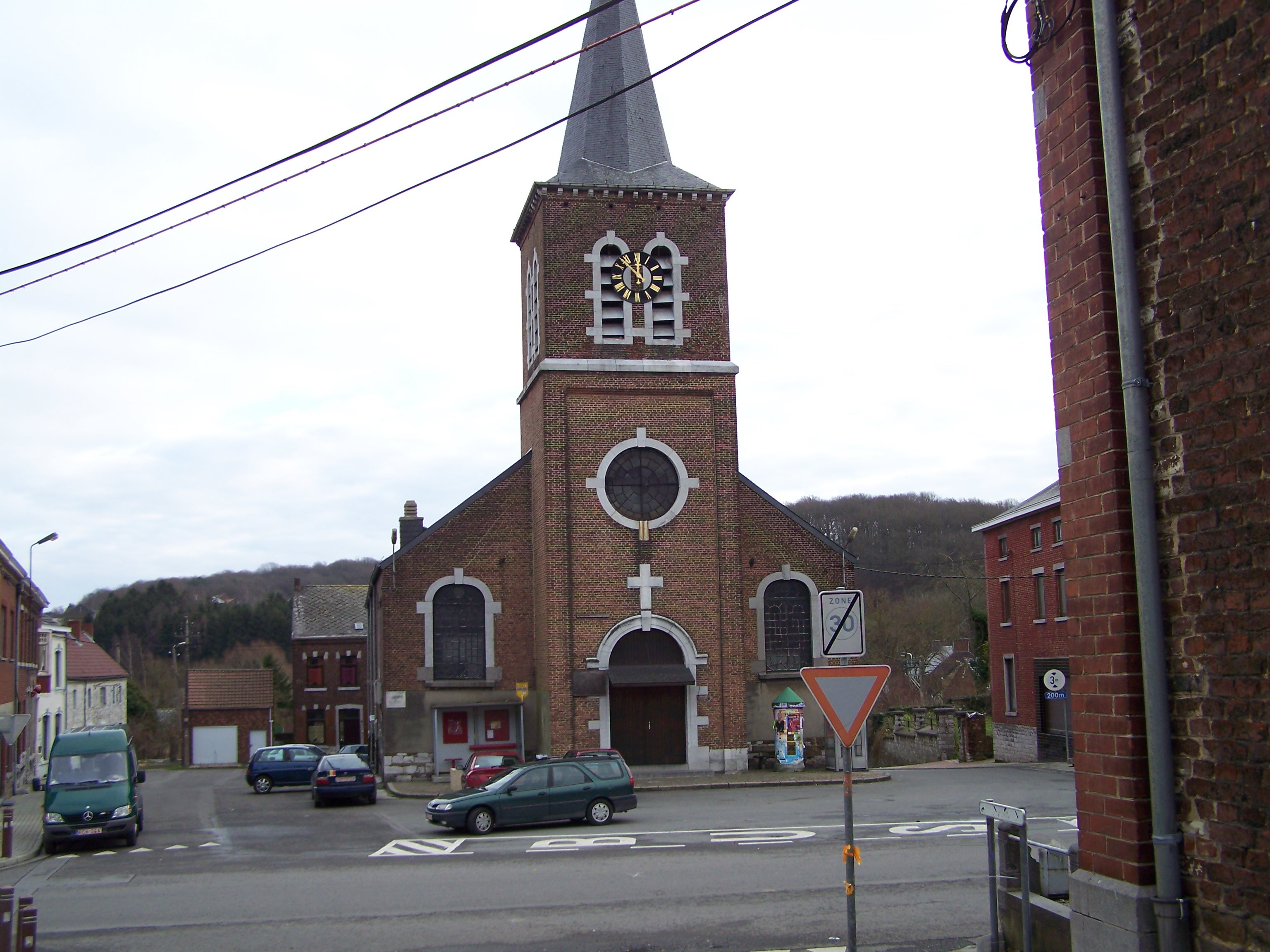

- Location in Belgium
- Coordinates: 50°25′N 4°37′E
- Country: Belgium
- Region: Wallonia
- Province: Namur
- Municipality: Sambreville

Area
  - Total: 4.83 km^{2} (1.86 sq mi)
- Elevation: 115.45 m (378.8 ft)

Population (1999)
  - Total: 3,448
  - Density: 713.87/km^{2} (1,848.9/sq mi)
- Postal code: 5060

Falisolle (French pronunciation: [falizɔl]; Walloon: Farjole) is a village of Wallonia and a district of the municipality of Sambreville, located in the province of Namur, Belgium and located a few kilometers south of Sambre. It was a community in its own right before the municipal mergers in 1977. The village covers an area of 4.83 square kilometers and is officially 115.45 m above sea level. As of 1999 it had a population of 3,448.

== History ==
Falisolle was one of the possessions which were ceded around 650 CE to the monastery of Fosses by Itta, the widow of the Mayor of the Pepin of Landen Palace. The locality remained in the hands of the group until the end of the Ancien Régime and designated a dependency of Liège. The advowson rights belonged to the lord of Morialmé. This advow protected and defended the community, especially religious institutions, which in turn provided the advow with a portion of their property or estate rights.

In 1219 CE, Arnold of Morialmé consolidated his privileges in Falisolle, Vitrival and Auvelais-le-Voisin in his position as advow; At the time representing one-third of the fees paid if he was called upon to collect. A 15th century record states that the Falisolle advow also benefited from the assize's taille, although he did not have a judicial role. Of those who lived in Falisolle, the Count retained right of tax and property, municipal duties and horse charges. During the creation of new bishoprics in 1559, Falisolle remained part of Liege. Henceforth, it was attached to the Diocese of Namur.
