= James of Vitry =

French theologian, historian, priest and philosopher (died 1240)

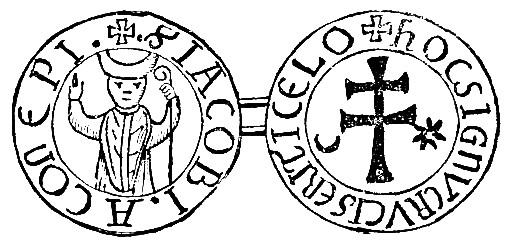
Seal of Jacques de Vitry as bishop of Acre

James of Vitry (French: Jacques de Vitry; Latin: Iacobus de Vitriaco; c. 1160/70 – 1 May 1240) was a French canon regular who was a noted theologian and chronicler of his era.

He was elected bishop of Acre in 1214 and made cardinal in 1229. His Historia Orientalis (also known as Historia Hierosolymitana) is an important source for the historiography of the Crusades.

== Biography ==
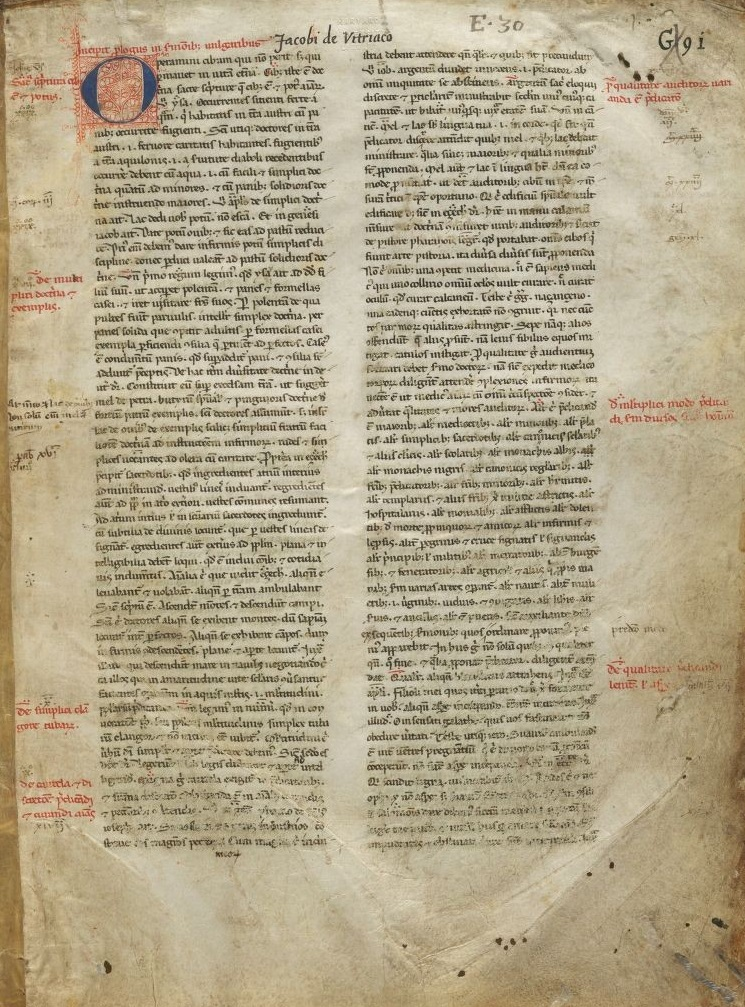
Manuscript of Sermones Vulgares, 13th century, by Jacques de Vitry

James was born in central France (perhaps Reims). He was born in 1170 at the latest.

He studied at the University of Paris, becoming a canon regular in 1210 at the Priory of Saint-Nicolas d'Oignies in the Diocese of Liège, a post he maintained until his consecration as bishop in 1216. From 1211 to 1213 he preached the Albigensian Crusade, touring France and Germany with William, the archdeacon of Paris, and recruiting many Crusaders.

In 1214, James was elected bishop of Acre. He received episcopal consecration and arrived at his see in 1216. He was subsequently heavily involved in the Fifth Crusade, participating in the siege of Damietta from 1218 to 1220. In 1219 he began to write the Historia Hierosolymitana, a history of the Holy Land from the advent of Islam until the crusades of his own day, but only two parts were completed. He returned to Europe in 1225.

Between 16 April and 29 July 1229, Pope Gregory IX elevated James to the College of Cardinals and transferred him to the suburbicarian see of Frascati. With the exception of a short legation to Emperor Frederick II in 1232, he spent his last years working in the papal court. He subscribed the papal bulls between 29 July 1229 and 23 June 1239. He died at Rome as dean of the Sacred College of Cardinals. His remains were transferred to Oignies and buried there in 1241.

After the death of the Latin Patriarch of Jerusalem Gerold of Lausanne in 1238 or 1239, the canons of the church in Jerusalem asked Gregory IX to send James back to the east as the new patriarch. According to Gregory's response, dated 14 May 1240, James had already died, and instead the pope appointed Robert of Nantes as the new patriarch.

Aside from the Historia, his works include hundreds of sermons, and letters to Pope Honorius III. He also wrote about the immoral life of the students at the University of Paris and the holy life of the Beguines of Liège, in particular his Life of Marie d'Oignies, whose advice inspired him to become a canon regular.

James of Vitry was fascinated by the powers held by the beguines, such that they were paralleled with the priests of the time, yet functioned outside the church proper. Although this movement was unrecognized in the church, James made appeal to Pope Honorius III to legitimize the work of their community, as well as the Liège diocese, all France and throughout the Holy Roman Empire.

== Reliquary at Oignies ==
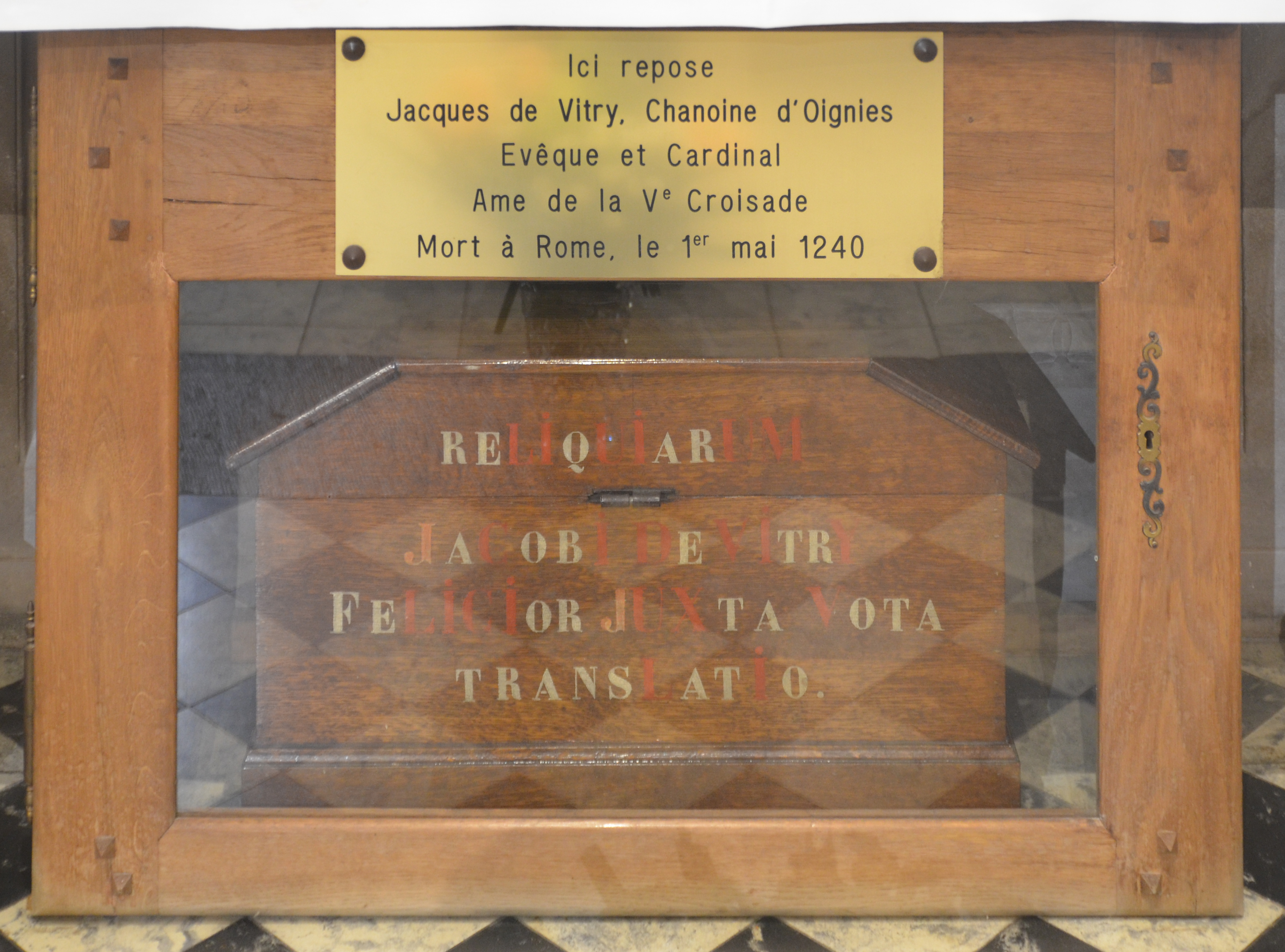
Jacques's reliquart

In 2015, the CROMIOSS project, led by the Archaeological Society of Namur (SAN) in partnership with several Belgian universities and research institutes, undertook an interdisciplinary scientific study around the reliquary of James of Vitry, located in the church of Saint Marie d'Oigines in Belgium. Anthropological, isotopic and genetic analyses indicated a high likelihood that the remains were in fact those of James of Vitry. His unique parchment mitre was also analysed. Forensic work on the skull, supplemented with DNA evidence, also allowed for the creation of a visual reconstruction of what the bishop might have looked like. The remains were reinterred at Oignies in 2019.

== Editions ==
Historiography

- Orientalis et occidentalis Historia. ed. F. Moschi, ex officina typographica Balthazaris Belleri, Douai, 1596, (archive.org, online facsimile).
- Historia Hierosolimitana. ed. Jacques Bongars, in: Gesta Dei Per Francos, Sive Orientalium Expeditionum, Et Regni Francorum Hierosolimitani Historia. 1611, (online facsimile).
- John Frederick Hinnebusch (ed.): The Historia occidentalis of Jacques de Vitry. A Critical Edition (= Spicilegium Friburgense. Texte zur Geschichte des kirchlichen Lebens. vol. 17, ISSN 0561-6158). The University Press, Fribourg 1972.
- Jacques de Vitry. Historia Orientalis, ed. Jean Donnadieu, 2008.

Translations:

- Abridged and incomplete translation to English: The {Abbreviated} History of Jerusalem, A.D. 1180 by Jacques de Vitry (= Palestine Pilgrims' Text Society vol. 11, no. 2, ZDB-ID 2224954-0), translated by Aubrey Stewart, year 1896.
- French translation: Histoire des croisades, par Jacques de Vitry, translated by François Guizot year 1825

Sermons

- Sermones de tempore. Kreuzherrenkonvent, Düsseldorf 1486, (Digitized)
- Sermones de Tempore. In aedibus viduae & haeredum Ioannis Steelsij, Antwerpen 1575.
- Iacobus de Vitriaco. Sermones vulgares vel ad status I, éd. J. Longère (Corpus Christianorum. Continuatio Mediaevalis 255), Turnhout: Brepols Publishers, 2013 (ISBN 978-2-503-54532-5)
- Sermones vulgares. In: Analecta Novissima Spicilegii solesmensis. Disseruit Joannes Baptista Pitra. Band 2. Typis Tusculanis, Paris 1888, (excerpts).
- The Exempla or Illustrative Stories from the Sermones Vulgares of Jacques de Vitry (= Publications of the Folk-Lore Society. 26, ZDB-ID 401527-7). Edited with introduction, analysis, and notes by Thomas Frederick Crane. Nutt, London 1890, (archive.org).
- Joseph Greven (ed.): Die Exempla aus den Sermones feriales et communes des Jakob von Vitry (= Sammlungen mittellateinischer Texte. 9, ZDB-ID 500169-9). Winter, Heidelberg 1914, (archive.org).
- Goswin Frenken, Die Exempla des Jacob von Vitry. Ein Beitrag zur Geschichte der Erzählungsliteratur des Mittelalters (= Quellen und Untersuchungen zur lateinischen Philologie des Mittelalters. vol. 5.1, ZDB-ID 516355-9). Beck, München 1914.

Letters

- Reinhold Röhricht (ed.): Briefe. In: Zeitschrift für Kirchengeschichte. vol. 14, 1894, 97–118; vol. 15, 1895, vol. 568–587; vol. 16, 1896, 72–114.
- Lettres de Jacques de Vitry ed. R. B. C. Huygens. Leiden, 1960.

Other

- Vita b. Mariae Oignies. In: Acta Sanctorum. Junii. vol. 4. Petrus Jacobs, Antwerp 1707, 636–666.
