= History of Christian meditation =

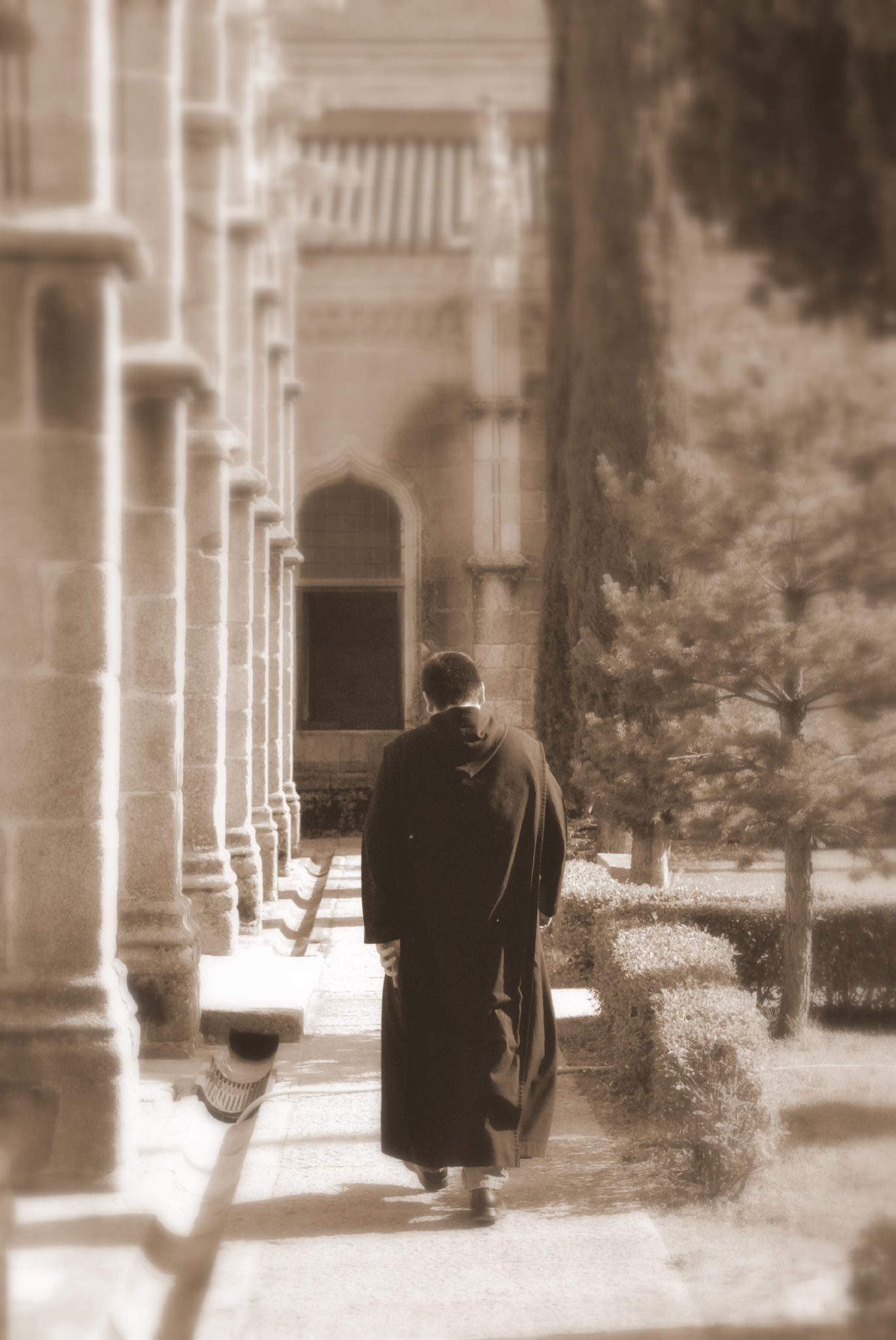
A monk walking in a Benedictine monastery

Prayer has been an essential part of Christianity since its earliest days. As the Middle Ages began, the monastic traditions of both Western and Eastern Christianity moved beyond vocal prayer to Christian meditation. These progressions resulted in two distinct and different meditative practices: Lectio Divina in the West and hesychasm in the East. Hesychasm involves the repetition of the Jesus Prayer, but Lectio Divina uses different Scripture passages at different times and although a passage may be repeated a few times, Lectio Divina is not repetitive in nature.

The progression from Bible reading, to meditation, to loving regard for God, was first formally described by Guigo II, a Carthusian monk who died late in the 12th century. Guigo II's book The Ladder of Monks is considered the first description of methodical prayer in the western mystical tradition.

In Eastern Christianity, the monastic traditions of "constant prayer" that traced back to the Desert Fathers and Evagrius Pontikos established the practice of hesychasm and influenced John Climacus' book The Ladder of Divine Ascent by the 7th century. These meditative prayers were promoted and supported by Saint Gregory Palamas in the 14th century.

From the 18th century some components of meditation began to be de-emphasized in some branches of Western Christianity. However, the early part of the 20th century witnessed a revival and books and articles on approaches such as Lectio divina aimed at the general public began to appear by the middle of the century. In 1965 one of the principal documents of the Second Vatican Council, the dogmatic constitution Dei verbum (Latin for Word of God) emphasized the use of Lectio divina and on the 40th anniversary of Dei verbum in 2005 Pope Benedict XVI reaffirmed its importance.

== Early Christianity ==
The history and origins of Christian meditation have been intertwined with that of monastic life, both in the East and the West. By the 4th century, groups of Christians, who came to be called the Desert Fathers, had sought God in the deserts of Palestine and Egypt, and began to become an early model of monastic Christian life. The tradition of a Christian life of "constant prayer" in a monastic setting began in this period. I

In the 5th century, John Cassian described their life as prayerful and shaped by contemplation of God and Evagrius Ponticus wrote extensively on pure prayer and the Sayings of the Desert Fathers appeared thereafter. The "prayer of fire" that emerged in this period, was said to have been driven by the love for God, which was to shape a life of meditation and contemplation in the East. However, these "desert meditations" are not equivalent to the modern methods of reflection and meditation. The desert monks gathered to hear scripture recited in public, and would then recite those words privately in their cells. For them meditation was a memorization and recitation of scripture, primarily as a verbal exercise.

== Early Middle Ages ==
By the end of the 4th century, Martin of Tours had introduced monasticism to the West and the western monastic traditions began to take shape. By the 6th century, the Rule of Saint Benedict included three elements: public prayer, manual labor and lectio divina. The emergence of the Christian monastic tradition included the development of an austere and secluded lifestyle and practices that were intended to help meditation by freeing the mind from worldly matters, e.g. in his Rule for monastic life, Gregory the Great developed 12 steps towards asceticism based on abstinence and mortification of the flesh and search for humility. In order to avoid worldly contamination by seculars (i.e. not monks or clergy) the Rule of Saint Benedict forbade a monk from eating with them unless the monk was so far away that he could not return to the monastery that day.

The four movements of Lectio divina: read, meditate, pray, contemplate

The Rule of Saint Benedict (chapter #48) stipulated specific times and manners for Lectio Divina - a meditative reading of Scripture. Due to its specific blending of spirituality with moderation and balance, the Benedictine Rule became widely used by the 10th century, and became the de facto standard for Western monastic life in the Middle Ages.

After the 10th century, during the Byzantine Empire, the traditions of the Desert Fathers led to a style of life and prayer in the Eastern Church called hesychasm, developed particularly on Mount Athos in Greece. St. Gregory of Sinai is generally considered by most to be the founder of the hesychastic approach to prayer in early 14th century. Although controversies appeared thereafter between Barlam and St. Gregory Palamas, hesychasm was eventually well established within Eastern Christianity, but never made significant inroads in the West. While hesychasm involves the repetition of the Jesus Prayer, Lectio Divina uses different Scripture passages at different times and although a passage may be repeated a few times, Lectio Divina is not repetitive in nature.

The practice of prayer had undergone very little change in the West from its origins until the 11th century, at which point a major change took place via the introduction of methods of meditation. Monasticism played a key role in bringing about this change, first to establish basic concepts about the forms of prayer, then introduce meditation and finally to emphasize that monastic prayer is inseparable from a specific "way of life".

From the end of the 11th century two specific genres of literature for prayer appeared. The first was extensions of Augustinian forms of addressing God or oneself (e.g. his confessions or the Soliloquies). The "Meditations of St. Augustine" became a popular reading item. Saint Anselm composed "Meditations and Prayers" along similar lines, but it included no methodical elements and was simply a collection of material for Lectio Divina and the duration of the exercise was not specified. The second genre an example of which was Hugh of Saint Victor, tried to put more structure into meditation that was then available within the monastic tradition. Hugh wrote that there are three visions of the soul: "thinking, meditation and contemplation". Hugh aimed his meditations as a way towards contemplation of God." The approach was further developed by Guigo II whose "Ladder of Monks" is considered a key text in the field. This second genre lead to methodical prayer, and approaches in which the imagination holds a strong place.

Guigi II (the 9th Carthusian prior) went beyond the meditations of Guigo I (the 5th prior). For Guigo II, reading scripture is an "encounter with the word of God", meditation is "seeking the hidden meaning of this word", prayer is "turning one's heart to God" and contemplation is when "the mind is lifted up to God and held above itself". Guigo II's Ladder of the Monks may well be the first description of the "methodical prayer" in the mystical traditions of the west.

By the 11th century Saint Anselm of Canterbury was producing meditative prayers, which however, still focused towards the monastic traditions of Lectio Divina. Anselm began his Proslogion by calling it a "short work on an example meditation on the meaning of faith", and the meditations in the Proslogion are intended to lead the reader to a contemplation of God. Anselm's teachings, which greatly influenced the monastic meditation traditions of the Middle Ages were that meditation can lead to "seeing the face of God in contemplation".

== Latter part of Middle Ages ==
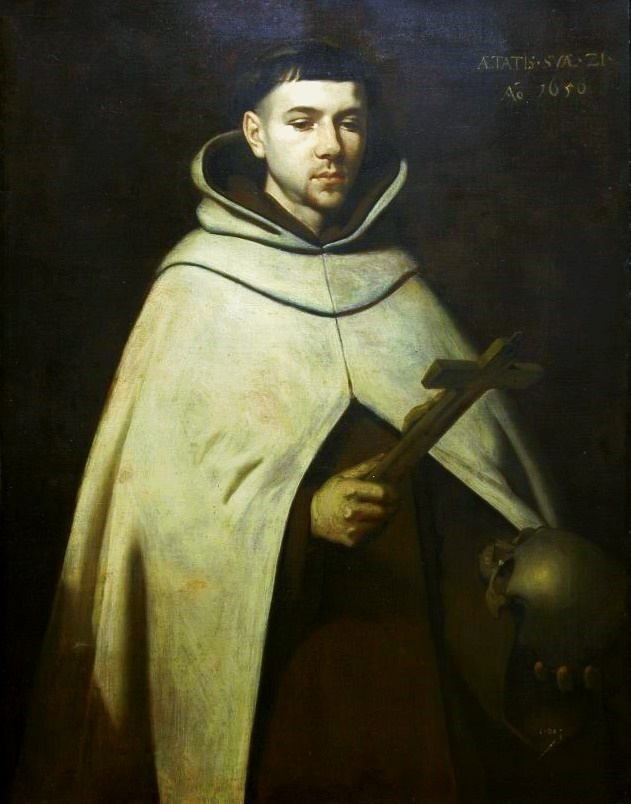
St. John of the Cross taught the four stages of Lectio Divina as: "Seek in reading and you will find in meditation; knock in prayer and it will be opened to you in contemplation".

Late in the 14th century Gerard of Zutphen had built on "Guigo's Ladder" to write his major work On Spiritual Ascents. Zutphen warned against considered meditation without reading of scripture, and taught that the reading prepares the mind, so meditation will fall into error. Similarly, he taught that meditation prepares the mind for contemplation. Zutphen's definition of meditation is generally considered the synthesis of medieval consensus on the topic of meditation:

Meditation is the process in which you diligently turn over in your heart whatever you have read or heard, earnestly reflecting upon it to enkindle your affection or enlighten your understanding.

By the 14th century, the practice of meditation in the West had become more systematic as the arrival of Devotio Moderna in Germany and the Netherlands introduced more structure into it through the writings of Geert Groote, Gerard of Zutphen and Jan Mombaer. By this time, the tradition of "methodical prayer" which arranged exercises day by day and week by week found significant following within the Catholic Church, as well as later Reformed communities. In the 15th century, Ignatius of Loyola developed the technique in which the meditator enters the Biblical scene, e.g. begins a conversation with Jesus on the Cross in Calvary. A similar idea had been developed by Ludolph of Saxony in his Vita Christi in 1374 in which the reader would make themselves present in the life of Jesus.

During the 15th century, reforms of the clergy and monastic settings were undertaken by the two Venetians, Lorenzo Giustiniani and Louis Barbo. Both men considered methodical prayer and meditation as essential tools for the reforms they were undertaking. Barbo, who died in 1443, wrote a treatise on prayer titled Forma orationis et meditionis otherwise known as Modus meditandi. He described three types of prayer; vocal prayer, best suited for beginners; meditation, oriented towards those who are more advanced; and contemplation as the highest form of prayer, only obtainable after the meditation stage. Based on the request of Pope Eugene IV, Barbo introduced these methods to Valladolid, Spain and by the end of the 15th century they were being used at the abbey of Montserrat. These methods then influenced Garcias de Cisneros, who in turn influenced Ignatius of Loyola.

The methods of "methodical prayer" as taught by the devotio moderna groups had entered Spain and were known in the early 16th century. The book The Imitation of Christ which was known in Spain as Contemptus mundi became known in Spain, and while Teresa probably did not initially know of Guigo II's methods she was likely influenced by its teachings via the works of Francisco de Osuna which she studied. Teresa's contemporary and collaborator, John of the Cross continued the tradition of Guigo II and taught the four stages of Lectio Divina.

== 18th–20th centuries ==
From the 18th to the end of the 19th century the non-discursive components of meditation began to be de-emphasized in some branches of Western Christianity. By the middle of 19th century, the historical critical approach to biblical analysis which had started over a century earlier, and focused on determining the historicity of gospel episodes, had taken away some of the emphasis on biblical meditation outside monastic communities. However, in parallel, by the 19th century the importance of Biblical meditation had been firmly established in the Protestant spiritual tradition.

The non-discursive components or stages of meditative practice, which are often called "contemplation" in Western traditions, were beneficiaries of "a positive attitude toward contemplation [that] characterized the first fifteen centuries of the Christian era." But "a negative attitude has prevailed from the sixteenth century onward," according to Thomas Keating, a Trappist monk and a primary modern expositor of the Christian meditative method of Centering Prayer. Keating attributes the emergence of a negative attitude towards contemplation to several factors, including the 17th century controversy over Quietism and an increasing tendency to distinguish between "discursive meditation if thoughts predominated; affective prayer if the emphasis was on acts of the will; and contemplation if graces infused by God were predominant.... This division of the development of prayer into compartmentalized units entirely separate from one another helped to further the... notion that contemplation was an extraordinary grace reserved to the few."

Keating states that the Spiritual Exercises of Ignatius of Loyola are "extremely important in order to understand the present state of spirituality in the Roman Catholic Church," but that there has been a "tendency to reduce the Spiritual Exercises to a method of discursive meditation."

The early part of the 20th century witnessed a revival in the practice, and books and articles on approaches such as Lectio divina aimed at the general public began to appear by the middle of the century. In 1965 one of the principal documents of the Second Vatican Council, the dogmatic constitution Dei verbum (Latin for Word of God) emphasized the use of Lectio divina. On the 40th anniversary of Dei verbum in 2005 Pope Benedict XVI reaffirmed its importance and stated:

The 20th century has also witnessed a new focus on Biblical meditation. These may be defined as: "the devotional practice of pondering the words of a verse or verses of Scripture with a receptive heart." Modern Biblical meditations may be designed to relate and connect the Biblical message to the modern world. Such Biblical meditations may correspond to specific seasons such as Lent with the meditation topic selected to interact with two or three readings of the Bible during weekdays or Sundays of Lent. The meditation sequence may begin by a summary of the Bible reading, then suggest specific ideas for meditation, then conclude with an appropriate prayer. Such meditations may also be designed not just for "strong seasons" such as Lent or Easter, but also for Ordinary Time.

In the 20th century methods of Christian meditations have been taught using relatively new devotions such as the Divine Mercy devotion.

== See also ==
- Christian contemplation
- Christian mysticism
- Christian prayer
