= Ignatian spirituality =

Catholic religious tradition

Ignatian spirituality is a Catholic spirituality founded on the experiences of the 16th-century Spanish Saint Ignatius of Loyola, founder of the Jesuit order. The main idea of this form of spirituality comes from Ignatius's Spiritual Exercises, the aim of which is to help one "conquer oneself and to regulate one's life in such a way that no decision is made under the influence of any inordinate attachment." The Exercises are intended to give the person undertaking them a greater degree of freedom from their own likes and dislikes, so that their choices are based solely on what they discern God's will is for them. Even in the composition of the exercises by Ignatius early in his career, one might find the apostolic thrust of his spirituality in his contemplation on "The Call of the Earthly King" and in his final contemplation with its focus on finding God in all things.

== Development ==
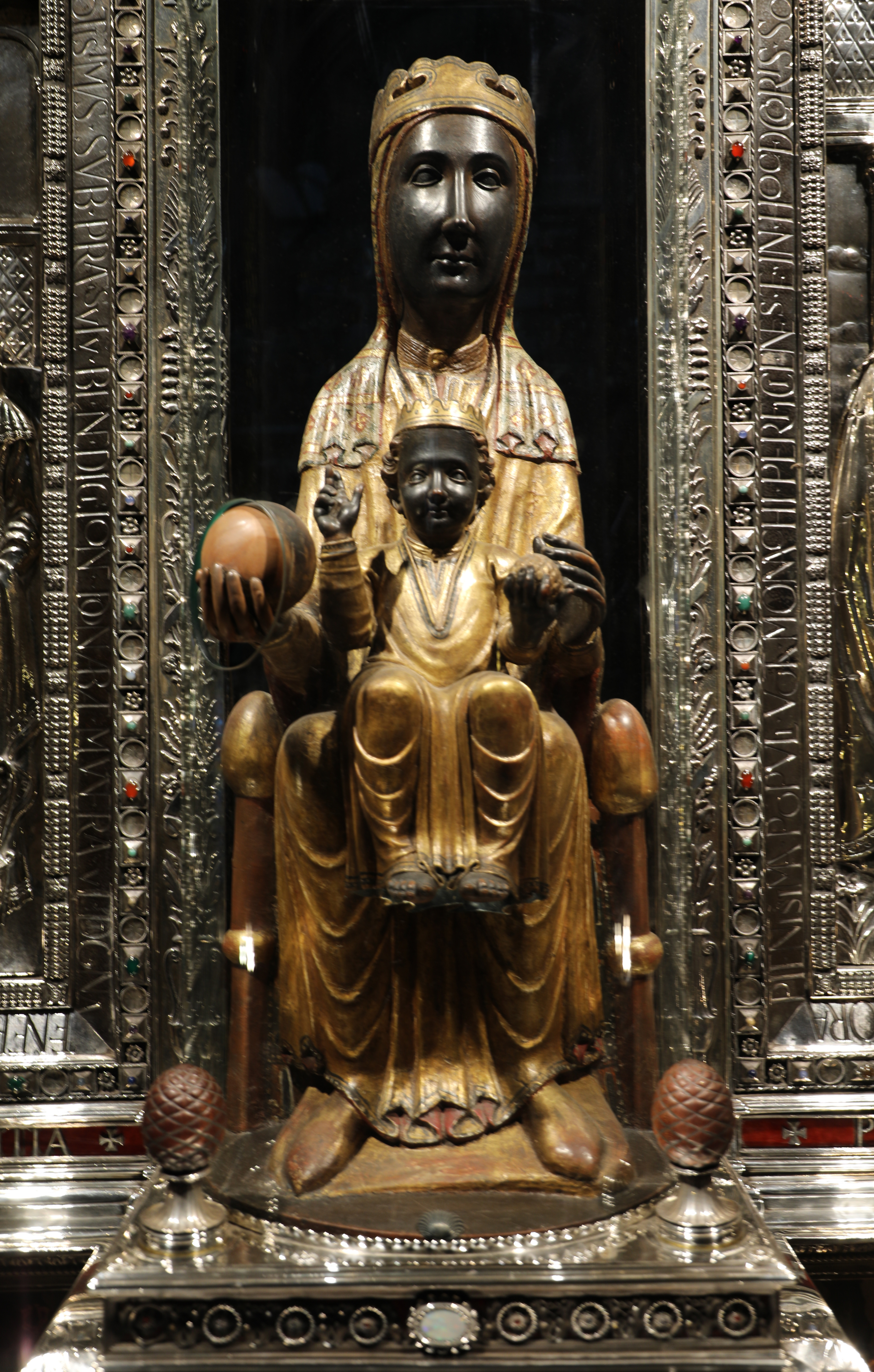
Upon his recovery from battle wounds, St. Ignatius of Loyola hung his military accoutrements before the image of the Virgin of Montserrat.

After recovering from a shattered right leg incurred during the Siege of Pamplona in 1521, Ignatius made a retreat with the Benedictines of Montserrat. They introduced him to the Ejercitatoria de la vida espiritual of Garcias de Cisneros, based in large part on the teachings of the Brothers of the Common Life, promoters of the "devotio moderna." From there, he spent ten months at Manresa, where he discovered The Imitation of Christ of Thomas à Kempis. Parts of the Exercises were completed later while he was a student in Paris.

== General principles ==
Ignatious spirituality has been described as a spirituality of finding God's will for better decision making. According to Hans Urs von Balthasar, "choice" is the center of the Exercises. Their original objective was the question of the choice of a state of life.

The Ignatian process of making good decisions acknowledges that decisions are often between two goods, understanding that the better good, or "the more" (lat. magis), is what we instinctively want, and what God wants for us. "In all things, to love and to serve" (Spanish: en todo amar y servir) was a motto of St Ignatius, who wanted to "be like St. Francis and St. Dominic", though better.

== Aspects of Ignatian spirituality ==
Ignatian spirituality has the following characteristics:

God's greater glory: St Ignatius of Loyola—"a man who gave the first place of his life to God" said Benedict XVI—stressed that "Man is created to praise, reverence, and serve God Our Lord and by this means to save his soul." This is the "First Principle and Foundation" of the Exercises. Ignatius declares, "The goal of our life is to live with God forever. God, who loves us, gave us life. Our own response of love allows God's life to flow into us without limit.... Our only desire and our one choice should be this: I want and I choose what better leads to the deepening of God's life in me."

Union with Jesus: Ignatius emphasized an ardent love for the Saviour. In his month-long Exercises, he devoted the last three weeks to the contemplation of Jesus: from infancy and public ministry, to his passion, and lastly his risen life. To achieve empathy with Jesus and a closer following of him, Ignatius proposed a form of contemplation that he called "application of the senses" to the scenes in the life of Jesus. The Spiritual Exercises, in 104, sum this up in a prayer that the believer may "love him more and follow him more closely". There is a considerable emphasis on the emotions in Ignatius' methods, and a call for one to be sensitive to emotional movements.

Self-awareness: Ignatius recommends the twice-daily examen (examination). This is a guided method of prayerfully reviewing the events of the day, to awaken one's inner sensitivity to one's own actions, desires, and spiritual state, through each moment reviewed. The goals are to see where God is challenging the person to change and to growth, where God is calling the person to deeper reflection (especially apt when discerning if one has a Jesuit vocation in life), to where sinful or imperfect attitudes or blind spots are found. The general examen, often at the end of the day, is, as the name implies, a general review. The particular examen, often in the middle of the day, focuses on a particular fault—identified by the person—to be worked upon in the course of some days or weeks. Since the 1970s there have been numerous in-depth studies and adaptations of the examen to contemporary needs. This is explained below under the title "Examen of Consciousness".

Spiritual direction: Meditation and contemplation, and for instance the aforementioned examen, are best guided, Ignatius says, by an experienced person. Jesuits, and those following Ignatian spirituality, meet with their spiritual director (traditionally a priest, though in recent years many laypersons have undertaken this role) on a regular basis (weekly or monthly) to discuss the fruits of their prayer life and be offered guidance. Ignatius sees the director as someone who can rein in impulsiveness or excesses, goad the complacent, and keep people honest with themselves. But the director should not so much explain but simply present the exercises, to not get in the way of God who "communicates himself with the well-disposed person." If the director is a priest, spiritual direction may or may not be connected with the Sacrament of Reconciliation.

Effective love: The founder of the Society of Jesus emphasized effective love (love shown in deeds) over affective love (love based on feelings). He usually ended his most important letters with "I implore God to grant us all the grace to know His holy will and to accomplish it perfectly." This love which leads us to a perfect correspondence with God's will demands self-sacrifice—renunciation of personal feelings and preferences. This is expressed in Ignatius' prayer in the last exercise of his Spiritual Exercises, which remains popular among Jesuits: "Take Lord and receive, all my liberty."

Detachment: Where Francis of Assisi's concept of poverty emphasized the spiritual benefits of simplicity and dependency, Ignatius emphasized detachment, or "indifference". This figures prominently into what Ignatius called the "First Principle and Foundation" of the Exercises. For Ignatius, whether one was rich or poor, healthy or sick, in an assignment one enjoyed or one didn't, was comfortable in a culture or not, etc., should be a matter of spiritual indifference—a modern phrasing might put it as serene acceptance. Hence, a Jesuit (or one following Ignatian spirituality) placed in a comfortable, wealthy neighborhood should continue to live the Gospel life with indifference to their surroundings, and if plucked from that situation to be placed in a poor area and subjected to hardships should with a sense of spiritual joy accept that as well, looking only to do God's will.

Prayer and efforts at self-conquest: Ignatius's book The Spiritual Exercises is a fruit of months of prayer. Prayer, In Ignatian spirituality, is fundamental since it was at the foundation of Jesus' life, but it does not dispense from "helping oneself", a phrase frequently used by Ignatius. Thus, he also speaks of mortification and of amendment.

Devotion to the Sacred Heart, the Eucharist, and Our Lady: The Society of Jesus has a relationship with the Order of the Visitation of Holy Mary in a commitment to spread the devotion to the Sacred Heart. Though the concept of devotion to Christ's mercy, as symbolized in the image of the Sacred Heart, goes further back, its modern origins can be traced to St. Marie Alacoque, a Visitation nun, whose spiritual director was the Jesuit St. Claude de la Colombière. The Jesuits promoted this devotion to emphasize the compassion and overwhelming love of Christ for people, and to counteract the rigorism and spiritual pessimism of the Jansenists. Pope Francis, in his encyclical letter Dilexit nos (2024) refers to the consecration of the Jesuit order to the Sacred Heart (1871) and a "great succession of Jesuit priests who spoke explicitly of the heart of Jesus".

St. Ignatius counseled people to receive the Eucharist more often, and from the order's earliest days the Jesuits were promoters of "frequent communion". It was the custom for many Catholics at that time to receive Holy Communion perhaps once or twice a year, out of what Catholic theologians considered an exaggerated respect for the sacrament. Ignatius and others advocated receiving the sacrament even weekly, emphasizing Holy Communion not as reward but as spiritual food. By the time of Pope Pius X (1903–1914), "frequent communion" had come to mean weekly, even daily reception.

Ignatius made his initial commitment to a new way of life by leaving his soldier's weapons (and symbolically, his old values) on an altar before an image of the Christ child seated on the lap of Our Lady of Montserrat. Also, the Jesuits were long promoters of the Sodality of Our Lady, their primary organization for their students until the 1960s, which they used to encourage frequent attendance at Mass, reception of Communion, recitation of the Rosary, and attendance at retreats in the Ignatian tradition of the Spiritual Exercises. Since the Second Vatican Council, Marian Sodalities have been largely replaced by small Christian Life Community (CLC) cells which emphasize the service of justice thrust that grew in the Catholic church after Vatican II. The CLC secretariat is at the Jesuit headquarters in Rome.

Zeal for souls: This characteristic of Ignatian Spirituality comes from St. Ignatius's own intense apostolic desires and is certainly related to the purpose of the Society of Jesus, the religious order he founded. The purpose of the Society of Jesus, says the Summary of the Constitutions, is "not only to apply one's self to one's own salvation and to perfection with the help of divine grace, but to employ all one's strength for the salvation and perfection of one's neighbor."

Finding God in All Things: The vision that Ignatius places at the beginning of the Exercises keeps sight of both the Creator and the creature, the One and the other swept along in the same movement of love. In it, God offers himself to humankind in an absolute way through the Son, and humankind responds in an absolute way by a total self-donation. There is no longer sacred or profane, natural or supernatural, mortification or prayer—because it is one and the same Spirit who brings it about that the Christian will see and "love God in all things—and all things in God." Hence, Jesuits have always been active in the graphic and dramatic arts, literature, and the sciences.

Examen of Consciousness: The Examen of Consciousness is a simple prayer directed toward developing a spiritual sensitivity to the special ways God approaches, invites, and calls. Ignatius recommends that the examen be done at least twice, and suggests five points of prayer:

- Recalling that one is in the presence of God
- Thanking God for all the blessings one has received
- Examining how one has lived the day
- Asking God for forgiveness
- Resolution and offering a prayer of hopeful recommitment

It is important, however, that the person feels free to structure the Examen in a way that is personally most helpful. There is no right way to do it; nor is there a need to go through all of the five points each time. A person might, for instance, find oneself spending the entire time on only one or two points. The basic rule is: Go wherever God draws you. And this touches upon an important point: the Examen of Consciousness is primarily a time of prayer; it is a "being with God." It focuses on one's consciousness of God, not necessarily one's conscience regarding sins and mistakes.

Discernment: Discernment is rooted in the understanding that God is ever at work in one's life, "inviting, directing, guiding, and drawing" one "into the fullness of life." Its central action is reflection on the ordinary events of one's life. It presupposes an ability to reflect, a habit of personal prayer, self-knowledge, knowledge of one's deepest desires, and openness to God's direction and guidance. Discernment is a prayerful "pondering" or "mulling over" the choices a person wishes to consider. In discernment, the person's focus should be on a quiet attentiveness to God and sensing rather than thinking. The goal is to understand the choices in one's heart, to see them, as it were, as God might see them. In one sense, there is no limit to how long one might wish to continue in this. Discernment is a repetitive process, yet as the person continues some choices should, of their own accord, fall by the wayside while others should gain clarity and focus. It is a process that should move inexorably toward a decision.

Service and humility: Ignatius emphasized the active expression of God's love in life and the need to be self-forgetful in humility. Part of Jesuit formation is the undertaking of service specifically to the poor and sick in the most humble ways: Ignatius wanted Jesuits in training to serve part of their time as novices and in tertianship as the equivalent of orderlies in hospitals, for instance emptying bed pans and washing patients, to learn humility and loving service. Jesuit educational institutions often adopt mottoes and mission statements that include the idea of making students "men and women for others", and the like. Jesuit missions have generally included medical clinics, schools, and agricultural development projects as ways to serve the poor or needy while preaching the Gospel.

Some groups who find the Ignatian "way of proceeding" helpful include the Society of the Sacred Heart of Jesus (RSCJ), the Faithful Companions of Jesus (FCJ), the Loreto Sisters (IBVM), the Religious Sisters of Charity (RSC), the Oblates of the Virgin Mary, and the Christian Life Communities (CLC).

=== Spiritual Exercises ===
According to St Ignatius, the purpose of the Exercises is "to conquer oneself and to regulate one's life in such a way that no decision is made under the influence of any inordinate attachment." In other words, the Exercises are intended, in Ignatius' view, to give the exercitant (the person undertaking them) a greater degree of freedom from their own likes, dislikes, comforts, wants, needs, drives, appetites, and passions that they may choose based solely on what they discern God's will is for them and their students. Peter Hans Kolvenbach, while Superior General of the Jesuits, said that the Exercises "try to unite two apparently incompatible realities: exercises and spiritual". It invites to "unlimited generosity" in contemplating God, yet going down to the level of many details.

== See also ==
- Corpse-like obedience
- Jesuit fourth vow

== Bibliography ==
- O'Malley, John W. The First Jesuits Cambridge, Massachusetts: Harvard, 1993
- Martin, J. (2012). The Jesuit Guide to (almost) everything: A spirituality for real life. HarperOne.
