= Jacomijne Costers =

Jacomijne Costers (c. 1462 – 1503) was a nun and author whose vision of the afterlife, shown during a near-death experience, was written down in Visioen en exempel ("Vision and Exemplum").

== Biography ==
Costers lived in the Facons Monastery in Antwerp. Facons, originally called Valkenbroek, was a convent belonging to the Augustinian Congregation of Windesheim, and at the end of the 15th century there were concerns about the apparent lax discipline in the convent. In 1489 the plague struck the convent, and Jacomijne Costers was one of its victims. She survived, but was shown a vision in which devils took her to face Christ. These devils asserted a right to her sinful soul, and initially Christ seemed to agree with them; the intervention of Mary (besides her patron saint John the Evangelist and Augustine, patron saint of her order) saved her. She was sent through hell and purgatory, and given the assignment to recount her vision to help restore spiritual order to her house. She authored devotional texts afterwards, including some in rhyme.

Costers lived a more withdrawn life after her illness, which had left a lasting wound on her chest above her heart. She died on 28 April 1503, most likely of the plague, which struck her convent again that year.

== Works ==
Costers' work places her, like many of her fellow Augustinians, in the devotio moderna ("modern devotion") movement, and she urges a "reformation of the spiritual life in her convent" and a stricter observance of the Augustinian rule. Her Visioen en exempel was written in the style of the Visio Tnugdali, a 12th-century religious text of otherworldly visions.

Her patron saint was John the Evangelist, and her Previlesien van Sint Joannes Evangelist systematizes a set of devotions to him. Order and system were important to her, and she set up the devotions in a numerical structure similar to the Rosetum by Jan Mombaer, an Augustinian friar (1460–1501). She draws on the Gospel of John, his Epistles and Revelation, and possibly the Golden Legend; Wybren Scheepsma sees her Previlesien as evidence of the importance of the Golden Legend in the Windesheim congregation. She was said to have had an encounter with Christ who explained the "purpose of suffering", and in a letter described a revelation in which Saint Anne appeared to her.
