= William Griffin (author) =

American writer and translator (1935–2020)

Henry William Griffin (February 7, 1935 – February 19, 2020), known as William Griffin, was an American writer, editor, and translator, renowned for his extensive work on religious and literary subjects, particularly his studies on C. S. Lewis.

== Early life and education ==
Born in Waltham, Massachusetts, Griffin was the only child of Henry Francis Griffin and Margaret Mary Griffin. He attended Boston College High School, where he studied Latin and played baseball. After graduating in 1952, he entered the Jesuit novitiate, spending eight years with the Society of Jesus and completing a B.A. in English Literature. He later earned an M.A. in drama from the Catholic University in Washington D.C.

== Career ==
Griffin's career spanned over six decades, during which he made significant contributions as a writer, editor, and translator. He worked as a book editor for publishers such as Harcourt Brace Jovanovich and Macmillan, specializing in religious titles. At Macmillan, he oversaw the posthumous publications of C.S. Lewis, including the essay collection "The Joyful Christian." He also edited works by other notable Christian authors, such as Dorothy L. Sayers and Fulton J. Sheen.

As an author, Griffin wrote several novels, including "The Fleetwood Correspondence," an epistolary novel inspired by C.S. Lewis's The Screwtape Letters, and Dill of the Nile: The Wise Man Who Arrived Early. His major literary work, Clive Staples Lewis: A Dramatic Life, published in 1986 and later reissued as C.S. Lewis: The Authentic Voice, is considered a comprehensive biography of C.S. Lewis.

In addition to his work on Lewis, Griffin authored biographical studies on figures like Billy Graham and G.K. Chesterton. He also translated significant religious texts from Latin to English, including works by Thomas à Kempis and Augustine of Hippo, and from Korean to English, collaborating with his wife, Emilie Griffin, on translations of works by Joshua Choonmin Kang.

== Personal life ==
Griffin married Emilie Dietrich in 1963, and they had three children: Lucy, Henry, and Sarah. The family moved to New Orleans in 1980, where Griffin continued his literary endeavors. He died on February 19, 2020, at the age of 85, after a short illness.

== Selected works ==
Biographies:

- Clive Staples Lewis: A Dramatic Life (1986), reissued as C.S. Lewis: The Authentic Voice (2005)
- C.S. Lewis: Spirituality for Mere Christians (1998)

Novels:

- The Fleetwood Correspondence: An Epistolary Novel (1989)
- Dill of the Nile: The Wise Man Who Arrived Early (2011)

Translations:

- The Imitation of Christ" by Thomas à Kempis (2000)
- Christmas, New Year, Epiphany Sermons by Augustine of Hippo (2002)

Anthologies:

- The Joyful Christian: 127 Readings from C.S. Lewis (1977)
- The Whimsical Christian: 18 Essays by Dorothy L. Sayers (1978)
