= Gerard Zerbolt of Zutphen =

Gerard Zerbolt of Zutphen (1367, Zutphen - December 3, 1398, Windesheim) was a Dutch mystical writer and one of the first of the Brothers of the Common Life. His name has many variations, including "Gerardus de Zutphania", "Gerardus Zutphaniensis", "Zerbold van Zutphen", "Gerhard Zerbolt von Zutfen", "Gerardus Zerboltus", etc.

== Biography ==
Zerbolt was born in 1367 into a wealthy burgher family in Zutphen, then in the Duchy of Guelders. He got his first education in his hometown, and after attending one or more Latin schools elsewhere, he enrolled between 1383 and 1385 at the Brothers of the Common Life's St. Lebwin school in nearby Deventer. This school had been founded by Gerhard Groote (1340–1384) and in Zerbolt's time was led by Florentius Radewyns (1350–1400).

Even in the Brothers of the Common Life's community of "plain living and high thinking" Gerard was remarkable for his absorption in the sacred sciences and his utter oblivion of all matters of merely earthly interest. He held the office of librarian, and his deep learning in moral theology and canon law did the brothers good service, in helping them to meet the prejudice and opposition which their manner of life at first aroused. In Radewijns' absence, Zerbolt assumed his responsibilities as rector.

In June 1398, the plague drove most of the Brethren, including Zerbolt, from Deventer. They found refuge in Amersfoort until November. Here the legality of the Brotherhood was attacked regularly by the local clergy. Soon after his return to Deventer, Zerbolt traveled to the Benedictine monastery at Dikninge in Drente to confer with its learned abbot Arnold about the attacks. On his way home on December 3, Zerbolt and his companion stopped for the night at Windesheim, a small village just south of Zwolle. He felt mortally ill and died within a few hours, at the age of 31. Because of his heralded status, the Windesheim canons buried him quickly in an honored spot in their own chapel, before the Brethren from Deventer could collect the body.

== Writings ==
Zerbolt was a prolific writer. His best known works are entitled Homo quidam and Beatus vir; the two are almost identical. Two treatises on prayer in the mother-tongue and on reading the Scripture in the mother-tongue are attributed to him.
