= Medieval Restorationism =

Medieval Restorationism was a number of movements that sought to renew the Christian church during the Middle Ages. The failure of these movements helped create conditions that ultimately led to the Protestant Reformation.

== Background ==
According to Barbara Tuchman, beginning in about 1470, a succession of Popes focused on acquiring money, their role in Italian politics as rulers of the papal states, and power politics within the college of cardinals. France had largely controlled the papacy. It was relocated to Avignon in the 14th century to escape violent instability between the factions of the Roman nobility. The Avignon papacy, followed by the Western Schism, weakened the papacy's authority when there were two popes between 1378 and 1417. It had been hoped that the restoration of the papacy to Rome in the 1430s would result in a church that concentrated on religious affairs, with many pressing issues. However, most of the popes during the following period were accused of focusing on making their young relatives cardinals, appointing relatives and supporters to more than one clerical office, simony (the selling of clerical offices for profit), and general acquisitiveness.

== Medieval restorationism ==
Timeline of Proto-Protestant groups

The restorationist movement at the time was centered on movements that wanted to renew the church (at that time, within European Christendom, there was only Roman Catholicism in the west and Eastern Orthodoxy in the east), such as the Florians, Apostolic poverty, Humiliati, Lollards, Hussites, Waldensians, Devotio Moderna, Conciliarism, Franciscans and Brethren of the Common Life. While these pre-reformation movements did presage and sometimes discussed a break with Rome and papal authority, they also provoked restorationist movements within the church, such as the councils of Constance and Basle, which were held in the first half of the 15th century. Preachers at the time regularly harangued delegates to these conferences regarding simony, venality, lack of chastity and celibacy, and the holding of multiple benefices. The lack of success of the restorationist movements after this time led inexorably to the Protestant Reformation.

== See also ==
- Avignon papacy
- History of the papacy
- Western Schism
