= Devotio Moderna =

Medieval movement for religious reform

Devotio Moderna (Latin; lit., Modern Devotion) was a movement for religious reform that called for apostolic renewal through the rediscovery of genuine pious practices such as humility, obedience, simplicity of life, and integration into the community. It began in the late 14th century, largely through the work of Gerard Groote, and flourished in the Low Countries and Germany in the 15th century but came to an end with the Protestant Reformation. It is most known today through its influence on Thomas à Kempis, the author of The Imitation of Christ, a book that has proved highly influential for centuries.

The movement believed mainly in austerity for Christians at every level, from clergy to layman, and many followers frowned upon such things as church-led celebrations of certain events.

== Origins ==
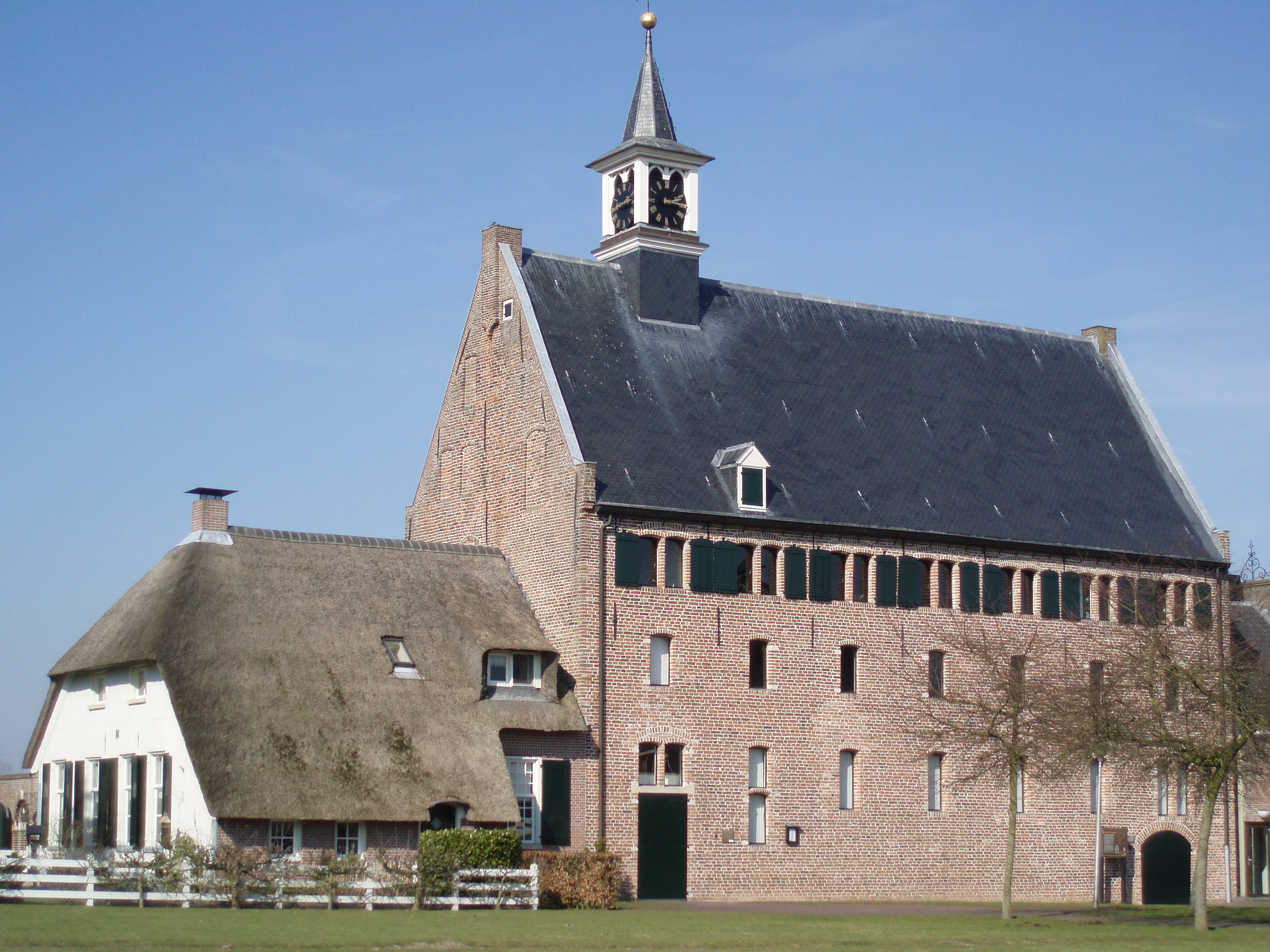
Modern photo of Windesheim

=== 1300s ===
The origins of the movement likely stem from the Congregation of Windesheim, but it has so far proved elusive to locate its precise origin. Broadly, it may be seen to rise out of widespread dissatisfaction with the Church, both in terms of the structure of the church and the personal lives of the clergy, in 14th-century Europe. Geert Groote (1340–1384) was among many in being highly dissatisfied with the state of the Church and what he perceived as the gradual loss of monastic traditions and the lack of moral values among the clergy. He sought to rediscover certain pious practices.

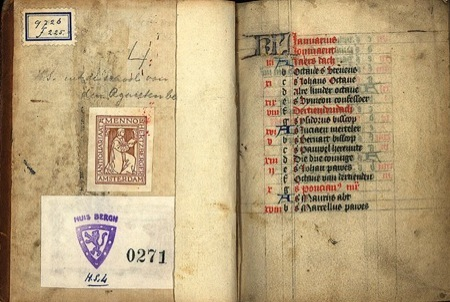
The beginning of the Book of the Hours of Geert Groote

Devotio Moderna began as a lay movement; around 1374, Groote turned his parental house in Deventer into a hostel for poor women who wished to serve God. Though similar to Beguine houses, the hostel, and later communities of what came to be called the "Sisters of the Common Life", were freer in structure than the beguines and kept no private property. The women who lived in these houses remained, also, under the jurisdiction of city authorities and parish priests. Their way of life therefore sat somewhere between ordinary Christian existence 'in the world', and the formation of an ecclesiastically recognised religious order.

From this point, several different loose forms of community emerged. On the one hand, various types of life for the female Devout were formed. Especially from the 1390s under the leadership of John Brinckerinck, one of Grote's early converts, the Sisters of the Common Life spread across the Netherlands and into Germany (with eventually about 25 houses in the former and about 60 houses in the latter). There were also many homes (mostly small and needy) inspired by the movement that were never formally attached to the Sisters of the Common Life, and may eventually have become Third Order Franciscans or Augustinian nuns.

Among male followers, the movement was given impetus after Groote's death in 1384 by Florens Radewyns, who had become a priest based on Groote's advice. He gathered likeminded laity and clergy into houses of communal living, eventually known as the Brethren of the Common Life, which numbered 41 by the early 16th century. The majority of members in these communities were priests or candidates for the priesthood (clerics); the few lay brothers, the familiares, usually carried out the menial tasks of cooking, cleaning and tailoring. The communities did not take vows but led an austere life of penance, prayer, spiritual reading and work, most often the copying of manuscripts. In addition, the Brethren provided pastoral care and spiritual counsel to the sister houses, and at least some of the Brethren engaged in preaching.

Groote's message of reform had also been aimed at clerics and priests, some of whom had joined the Brethren. In addition, under the leadership of Radewyns, some members in 1387 of the Deventer house nevertheless set up a new community at Windesheim, near Zwolle, and adopted the habit and rule of Saint Augustine. Although living a cloistered life under vows, the new community kept many of the practices and spiritual values of the teaching of Groote and Radewyns.

=== 1400s ===
From 1395, a monastic union was set up around Windesheim; this new confederation grew quickly, and was joined both by older Augustinian communities (including, famously, Groenendaal in 1413), as well as new foundations, and sometimes the conversion of some of the houses of Brothers to this new form of religious life. By the end of the 15th century, there were almost 100 houses (84 of them male) in the Chapter of Windesheim.

The movement faced opposition from clergy and laity at times both during its early years under Groote's leadership and under Radewyns' later expansion. Much of the suspicion was similar to that directed at other new forms of religious devotion developed in the period, such as beguine and beghard movements.

Also, the strong resemblance to the monastic life of the daily routine among the Brethren provoked accusations from the mendicant orders that the Brethren and Sisters of the Common Life were starting a new mendicant order, in violation of the Fourth Lateran Council's prohibition of new orders in 1215, without taking vows. The simplicity and devotion of the Devotio Moderna, though, seems to have lessened the force of many of these criticisms.

The movement was especially prominent in cities in the Low Countries during the 14th and the 15th centuries. Alongside its immediate impact, however, it was the writings of authors associated with the movement, who were most commonly based in the monasteries associated with Windesheim, which gave Devotio Moderna its wider European influence at the time, and its great subsequent influence.

=== Decline ===
In the early 16th century, even before the Protestant Reformation, Devotio Moderna was fading because Christians wanted more "pomp and ceremony in processions". In the wake of the Reformation, the institutions of Devotio Moderna declined rapidly.

In Protestant territories, both the brother houses and the monasteries were dissolved. Most of the houses of the Brethren, including the founding homes of Deventer and Zwolle, had disappeared by 1600. In Roman Catholic areas, some of the brother houses and houses of the Windesheim Congregation survived until they fell victim to the secularisations of the 18th and the 19th centuries. The most important members of the Windesheim Congregation in Germany, St. Marienwolde in Frenswegen, held out until 1809, when the state officially dissolved it. The last canon, Gerhard Tobbe, left Frenswegen in 1815.

== Teachings ==
Four cornerstones of the Brethren of the Common Life and its associated devotio moderna were:

- contempt of the world and of self (Latin: contemptus mundi et sui ipsius),
- imitation of the lowly life of Christ (Latin: imitatio humilis vitae Christi),
- good-will, benevolence (Latin: bona voluntas), and
- the grace of devoutness (Latin: gratia devotionis).

=== Contempt of the world and of self ===
A widely followed movement within the Devotio Moderna traditions frowned upon pilgrimages.

=== The Imitation of Christ ===
The Imitation of Christ (c. 1418), often attributed to Thomas à Kempis (d. 1471), a Brother of the Common Life, outlines Devotio Moderna's concepts, based on personal connection to God and the active showing of love towards Him (e.g., in the Blessed Sacrament of the altar or during Mass). It influenced a number of Saints such as Thérèse of Lisieux and Ignatius of Loyola. However, the movement's members also wrote in their native language, which was IJssellands, a written language that stood in between Middle Dutch and Middle Low German, The Imitation of Christ is written in Latin.

By the late 15th century, the advent of the printing press increased the reach of the movement; The Imitation of Christ was printed in several languages by the end of the century.

=== Techniques for prayer ===
The spiritual life of the movement's followers was marked by focus on inner devotions and frequent short periods of meditation, especially before each new activity.

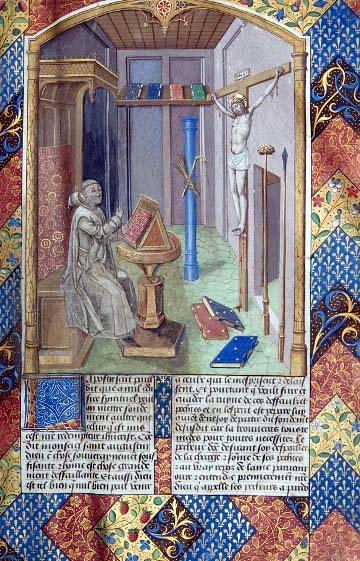
Vita Christi (Life of Christ) by Ludolph of Saxony, Vol. 1, folio.

The writings of the Devotio Moderna followers such as Gerard of Zutphen and Jan Mombaer, as well as Groote, introduced the tradition of "methodical prayer," which arranged exercises day by day and week by week. Groote's On Four Kinds of Matter for Meditation included mental imagery, as well as methodical approaches as an element of meditation.

Centuries earlier, Hugh of Saint Victor and Guigo II had produced structured methods for Christian meditation, but their approaches were less systematic. The methodical approach of Devotio Moderna towards prayer and meditation found significant following within the Catholic Church, as well as later Reformed communities. The manuals for methodical prayer and meditation by Florens Radewyns and Zutphen had significant influence within Europe for over a century.

The concept of immersing and projecting oneself into a Biblical scene about the life of Jesus was developed by Ludolph of Saxony in his Vita Christi in 1374 and became popular among the Devotio Moderna community. The methods of methodical prayer as taught by the Devotio Moderna entered Spain and were known in the early 16th century, and influenced the approaches to Christian meditation.

Garcias de Cisneros, the abbot of the Abbey of Montserrat, was influenced by the Devotio Moderna and his book Ejercitatorio de la vida spiritual ("Exercises for the Spiritual Life") became one of the primary sources for the Spiritual Exercises of Ignatius of Loyola. Ignatius used both techniques in his spiritual exercises: a methodical format, as well as self-projection into a Biblical scene such as by starting a conversation with Christ in Calvary. Also influenced by the Devotio Moderna were Ludovico Barbo, Lawrence Giustiniani and the Canons Regular of San Giorgio in Alga.

However, the methods of "methodical prayer" taught by Devotio Moderna and the techniques used for "self projection" into the imagery of a Biblical scene (to participate in the life of Jesus) significantly influenced the approaches to Christian meditation in the 16th century and thereafter. Those methods persist in meditations such as the Spiritual Exercises, which the Jesuits continue to practice.

== Influence ==
Devotio Moderna arose at the same time as Christian Humanism, a meshing of Renaissance humanism and Christianity and is related to German mysticism and other movements which promoted an intense personal relationship with God. Devotio Moderna emphasized the individual's inner life and promoted meditation according to certain strictures. With the ideals of Christian Humanism, Devotio Moderna recommended a more individual attitude towards belief and religion. It is regarded sometimes as a contributing factor for Lutheranism and Calvinism. It was also a significant influence upon Erasmus, who was brought up in the tradition.

== See also ==
- Brothers of the Common Life
- Canons Regular of San Giorgio in Alga
- Christian Humanism
- Christian meditation
- Hendrik Mande
- Imitation of Christ (ideal)
- Medieval Restorationism
- The Imitation of Christ (book)

== Sources ==
- McGinn, Bernard (2012). The Varieties of Vernacular Mysticism, 1350–1550. Crossroad Publishing Company. ISBN 978-0-8245-9901-0.
