= Provostry of St. Michael, Paring =

Coordinates: 48°51′04″N 12°05′41″E

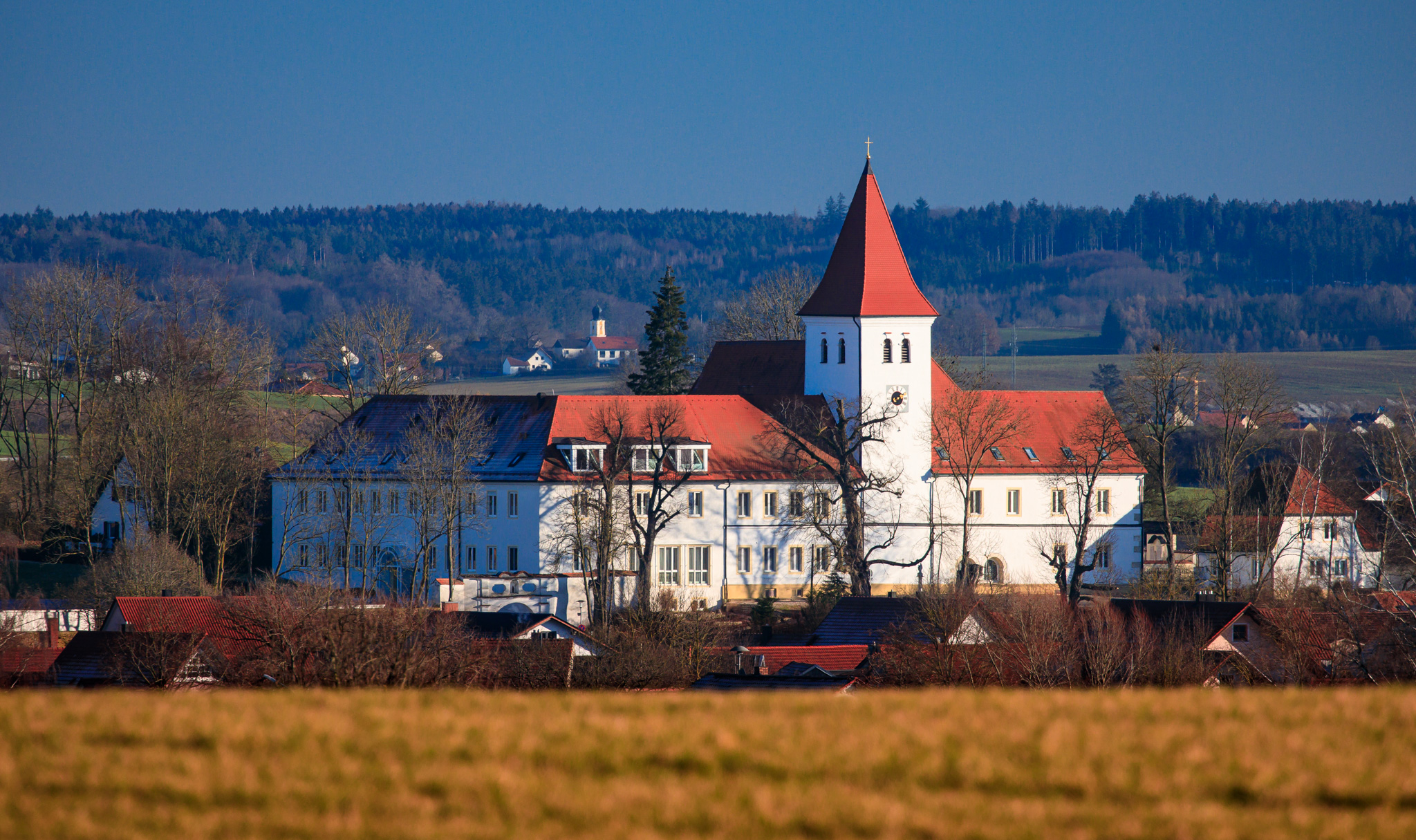
The monastic buildings, 2021

The Provostry of St. Michael (German: Propstei St. Michael) is a monastery in Paring, a part of Langquaid in the district of Kelheim in Bavaria, Germany.

== History ==
The monastery, dedicated to Saint Michael, was founded in 1141 by Gebhard von Roning, as a monastery of Canons Regular, which it remained until 1598. It was re-founded in 1616 by monks from Andechs Abbey as a Benedictine community, which was dissolved during the secularization of monasteries in Bavaria in 1803.

The monastery was bought in 1974 by the Canons Regular of the newly refounded Congregation of Windesheim, and is the motherhouse of this revived congregation.

== Buildings ==
The buildings had been bought by a farmer during the 19th century, and were partially destroyed.
