= Hendrik Mande =

Dutch Christian mystical writer

Hendrik Mande (Dordrecht,1350-60 – Beverwijk,1431) was a Dutch mystical writer, an early member of the Brethren of the Common Life, and an Augustinian Canon.

== Life ==
Hendrik Mande was born in Dordrecht, Holland. While serving as a copyist in the court of Count Willem, he heard the preaching of Geert Groote on the Devotio Moderna, a movement seeking a return to an apostolic faith based on piety, humility, obedience, and simplicity of life. Mande became a convert and joined the Brethren of the Common Life, a group devoted to the principles of Devotio Moderna.

About 1382, he moved to Deventer and then Zwolle, centers for the Brethren of the Common Life. In 1395 he joined the Congregation of Windesheim near Zwolle and became a canon, remaining there the rest of his life. Mande wrote fourteen mystical treatises, such as Book of Revelations (now lost), A Love Complaint (about the absence and inaccessibility of God ) and Apocalypse. His works drew heavily on those of Hugh of Saint Victor, Hadewijch and especially John of Ruusbroec.

== See also ==
- Hadewijch
- Hugh of Saint Victor
- Mysticism
- John of Ruusbroec
