= Jan Mombaer =

Jan Mombaer, also known as Johannes Mauburnus and as Johannes von Brüssel (1460, Brussels – 1501 Paris) was an Augustinian friar who composed hymns and was part of the devotio moderna movement.

He studied at the congregation of Augustinians in Utrecht and around 1477 entered the Congregation of Windesheim. Mombaer developed a structured method of organizing seemingly haphazard glances at the Bible to form consistent thoughts for a hymn. His work was also treasured by Martin Luther. As an Augustinian friar, Luther used Mauburnus' morning prayer upon rising. Later he used that prayer in crafting what many today know as "Luther's Morning Prayer" found in Luther's Small Catechism. Mombaer is best known for his Rosetum exercitiorum spiritualium et sacrarum meditationum (Rose-garden of spiritual exercises and sacred meditations) mentioned by Loyola as an influence on his own spiritual exercises.
