= Christian Life Community =

International lay Christian association

The Christian Life Community (CLC) is an international association of lay Christians who have adopted an Ignatian model of spiritual life. The Community is present in almost 60 countries.

== History ==
The CLC traces its foundation to 1563, when the Jesuit John Leunis gathered a group of lay students at the Roman College to form the Sodality of Our Lady. The Sodality grew and was confirmed by Pope Gregory XIII in 1584. When the Second Vatican Council urged groups like the Sodality to rediscover their original roots, some sodalities continued as before, while others became Christian Life Communities. The main difference is in the size (6 to 12) and the regularity of meeting (weekly or biweekly).

The CLC adopted its current name in 1967. Its General Principles were approved in 1971 and revised in 1990.

== Description ==
The CLC draws its inspiration from the teachings of St. Ignatius of Loyola, and receives spiritual guidance from the Jesuits. The experience of making the Spiritual Exercises of St Ignatius is of paramount importance to the members of the CLC. Members are encouraged to adhere to a lifestyle which is gospel-based and simple, to serve the poor and to integrate contemplation and action. As Ignatian spirituality has an essential apostolic dimension, members of the CLC do reflect also on how to bring Gospel values into all aspects of life in today's world.

The World Christian Life Community is governed by the General Assembly, which determines norms and policies, and by the Executive Council which is responsible for their ordinary implementation.

The organisation operates in 60 countries, including in most of the Australian capital cities as well as some country districts.
