= Florens Radewyns =

Dutch priest and scholar

Floris Radewyns (Latinized as Florentius Radwyn; c. 1350 – 24 March 1400) was a Dutch Catholic priest and the co-founder of the Brethren of the Common Life.

== Life ==
Radewyns was born at Leerdam, near Utrecht, about 1350. He passed a brilliant university course and took his M.A. degree at the University of Prague. Returning home, he was installed as canon of St. Peter's, Utrecht.

For some little time, Radewyns led a life of pleasure, until converted by a sermon of Geert Groote. Radewyns then resigned his canonry, placed himself unreservedly under Groote's direction, at his instance was ordained a priest, and accepted a poor benefice at Deventer, where Groote resided. There he powerfully seconded his friend's apostolate, especially among the poor clerical scholars of Deventer, and at his suggestion and in his house the first community of the Brethren of the Common Life was formed. They lived on the income of their book copying, permitting them to teach young men of humbler circumstances who demonstrated a potential for full-time religious life. From this came the founding of the Brethren of the Common Life.

It was also from Radewyns' house that the six brethren who established the offshoot Congregation of Windesheim went out in 1386. Among them was John, the elder brother of Thomas à Kempis, who was part of the Brethren. Thomas himself was under the immediate care and guidance of Radewyns from age 13 to 21. He wrote a loving and edifying sketch of his master, wherein he describes Radewyns as a man learned in the Scriptures and all sacred science, exceedingly devout, humble, simple, zealous, charitable and excessively mortified. His austerities affected his health, possibly leading to his death at Deventer on 24 March 1400.

He was commonly regarded among the brethren as a saint. His skull, with that of Groote, is still preserved in the Catholic church of Deventer (Broedern Kerk).
