= García Jiménez de Cisneros =

Spanish abbot (1455–1510)

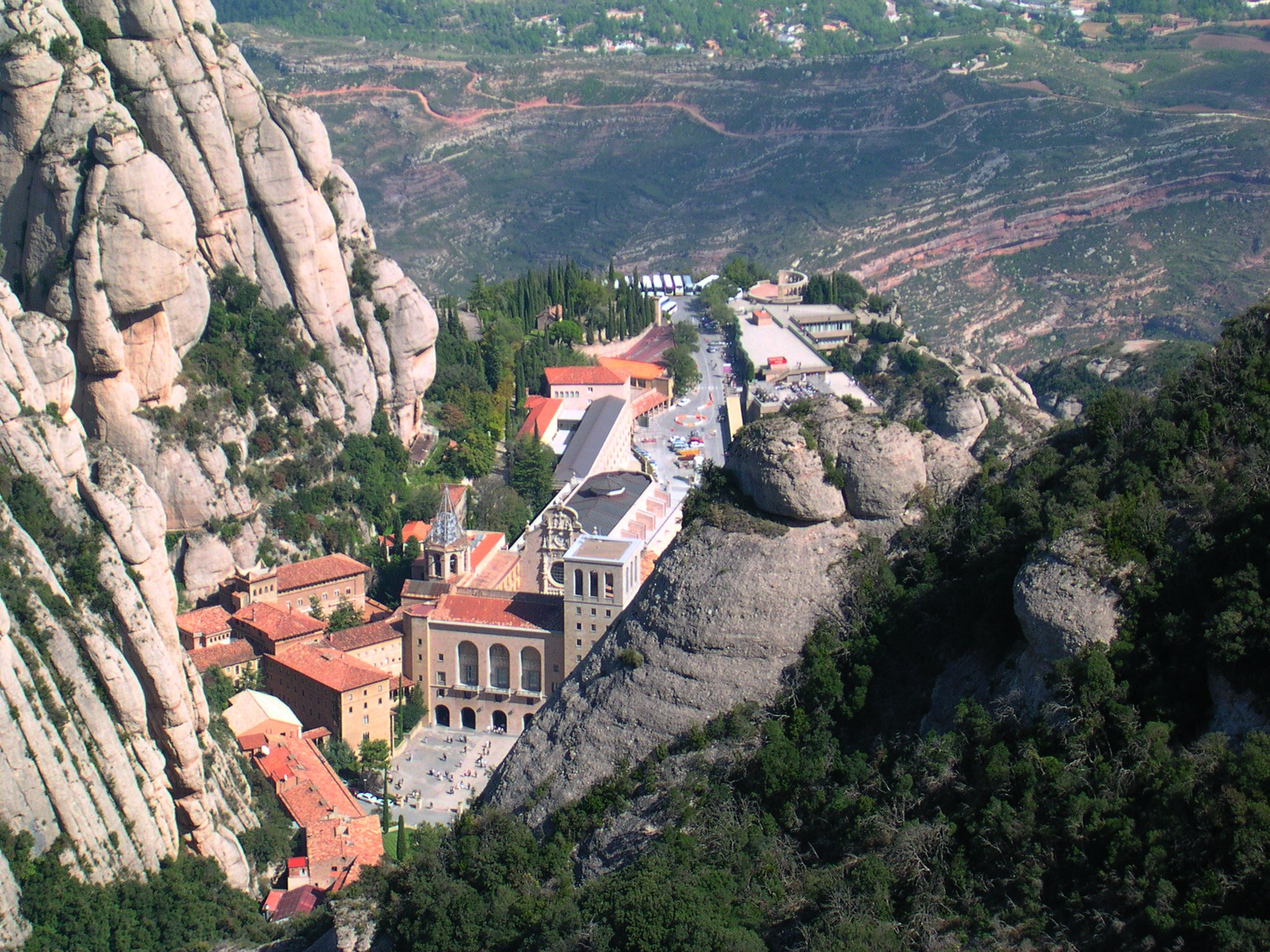
The abbey at Montserrat, where Cisneros was abbot

García Jiménez de Cisneros (1455–1510) was the abbot of Santa Maria de Montserrat in Spain.

As one of the early Spanish mystics, he was a pioneer in the use of meditative techniques, having been influenced both by the methodical prayers of the Devotio Moderna group, and the writings of Louis Barbo.

His book Ejercitatorio de la vida espiritual, i.e. "exercises for the spiritual life" was published at Montserrat in 1500 and was an important book on formal prayer and Christian meditation which influenced Saint Ignatius of Loyola, becoming one of the primary sources for his Spiritual Exercises.
