= Geert Groote =

Dutch Renaissance humanist and mystic (1340–1384)

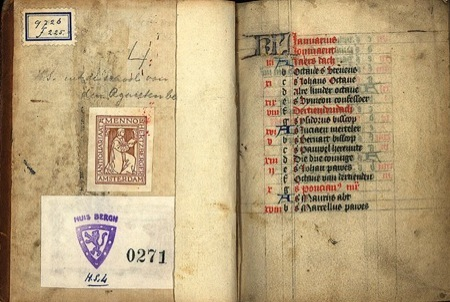
The beginning of the Book of the Hours of Geert Groote

Gerard Groote (October 1340 – 20 August 1384), otherwise Gerrit or Gerhard Groet, in Latin Gerardus Magnus, was a Dutch Catholic deacon, who was a popular preacher and the founder of the Brethren of the Common Life. He was a key figure in the Devotio Moderna movement.

== Biography ==
=== Birth and education ===
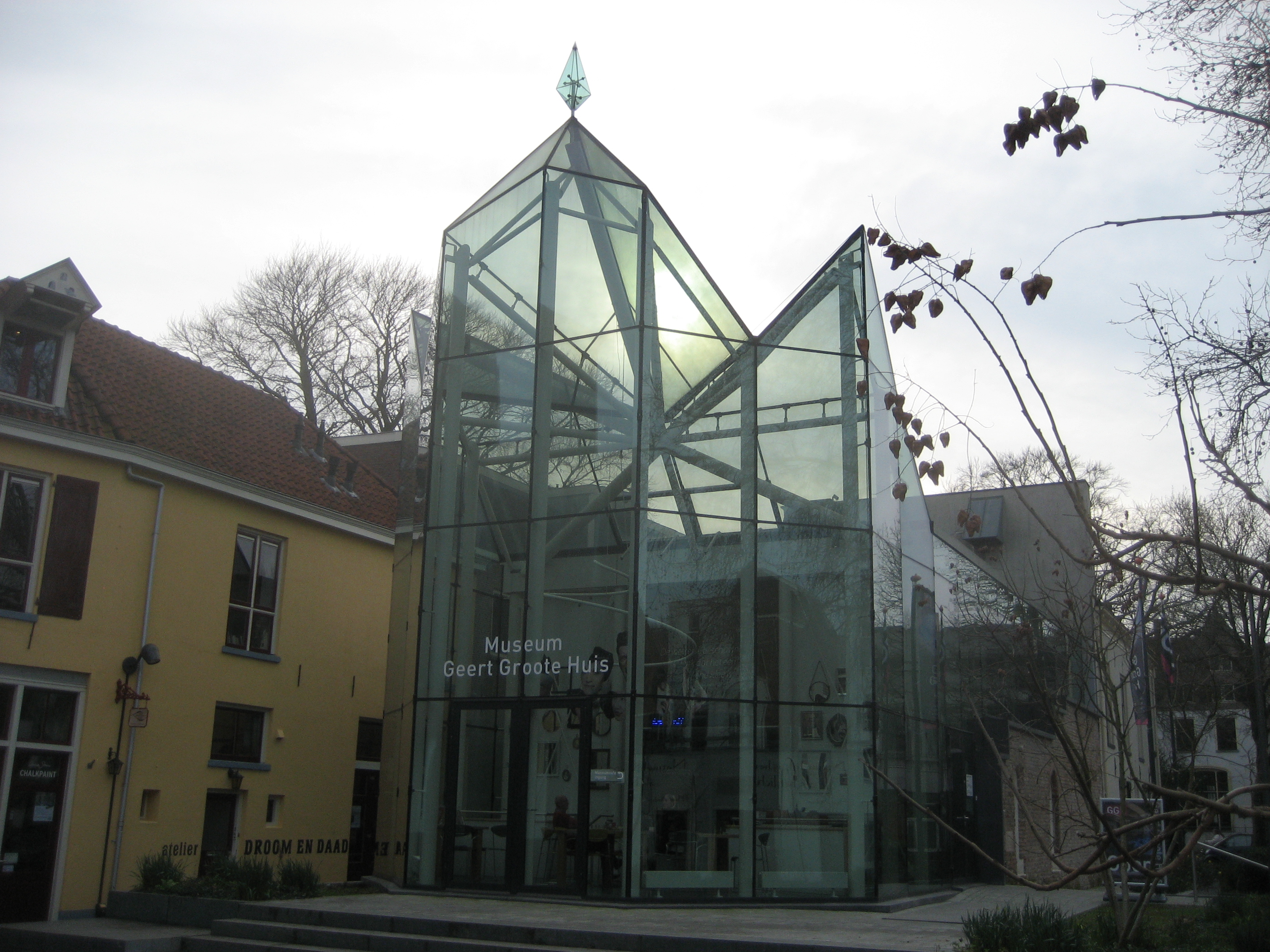
Museum Geert Grote Huis, Deventer (2016)

He was born in the Hanseatic city Deventer in the Bishopric of Utrecht, where his father held a good civic position. He studied at Aachen, then went to the University of Paris when only fifteen. Here he studied scholastic philosophy and theology at the Sorbonne under a pupil of William of Occam's, from whom he imbibed the nominalist conception of philosophy; in addition he studied Canon law, medicine, astronomy and even magic, and apparently some Hebrew. After a brilliant course he graduated in 1358. In 1362 he was appointed teacher at the Deventer chapter school.

=== Religious life ===
Soon after, Groote settled in Cologne, teaching philosophy and theology, and was granted a prebend in Utrecht and another in Aachen. In 1366 his countrymen sent him to Avignon on a secret mission to Pope Urban V. The life of the brilliant young scholar was rapidly becoming luxurious, secular and selfish, when a great spiritual change passed over him which resulted in a final renunciation of every worldly enjoyment. This conversion, which took place in 1374, appears to have been due partly to the effects of a dangerous illness and partly to the influence of a fellow student, Henry de Calcar, the learned and pious prior of the Charterhouse at Munnikhuizen (Monnikenhuizen) near Arnhem, who had remonstrated with him on the vanity of his life.

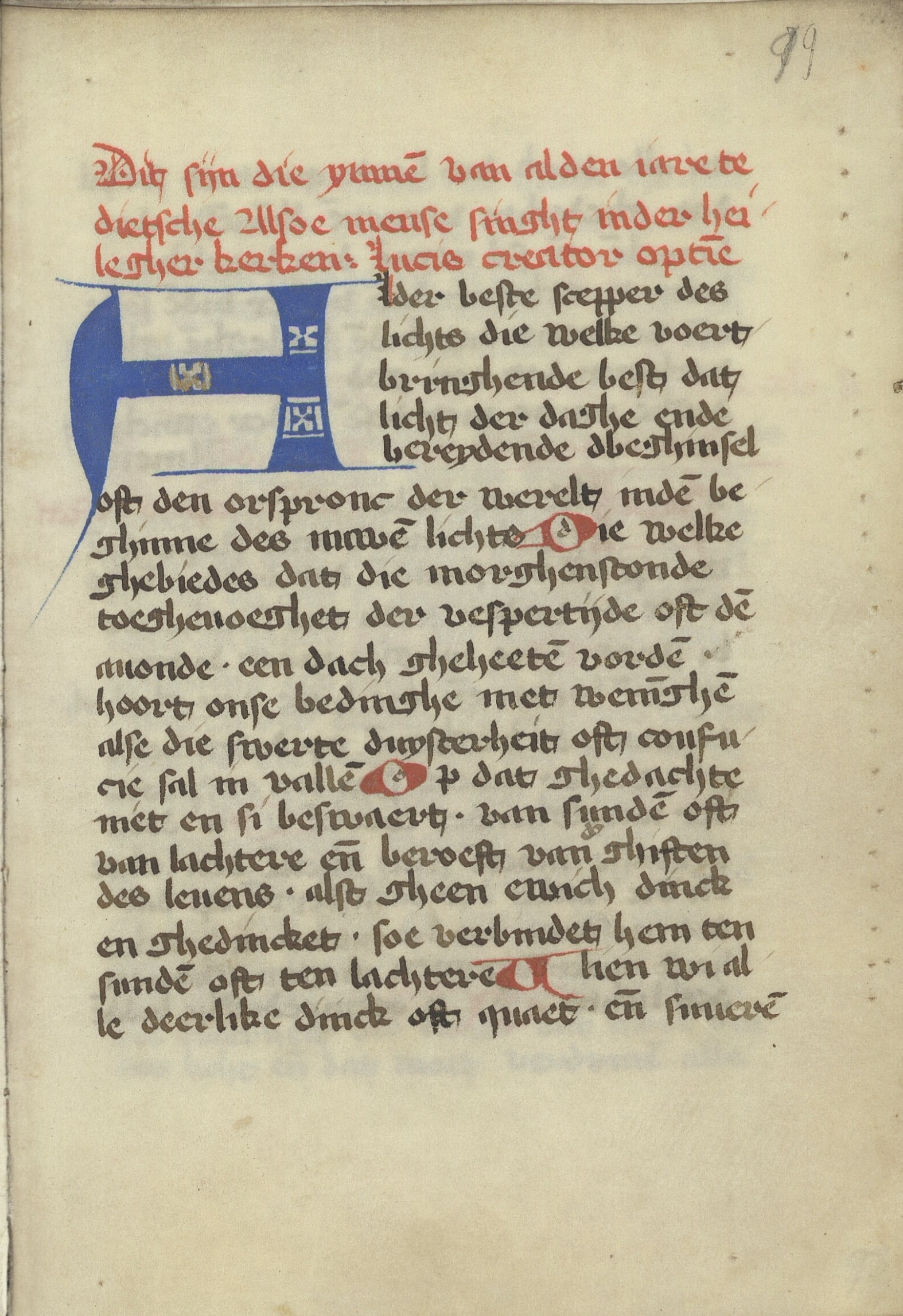
Excerpt from a "simple" Middle Dutch book of hours, using the translation of Geert Groote. Made in the 2nd half of the fifteenth century in Brabant.

In 1374 Groote turned his family home in Deventer into a shelter for poor women and lived for several years as a guest of the Carthusian monastery. In 1379, having received ordination as a deacon, he became a missionary preacher throughout the diocese of Utrecht. The success which followed his labours not only in the city of Utrecht, but also in Zwolle, Deventer, Kampen, Amsterdam, Haarlem, Gouda, Leiden, Delft, Zutphen and elsewhere, was immense; according to Thomas à Kempis the people left their business and their meals to hear his sermons, so that the churches could not hold the crowds that flocked together wherever he came.

The bishop of Utrecht supported him warmly, and got him to preach against concubinage in the presence of the clergy assembled in synod. The impartiality of his censures, which he directed not only against the prevailing sins of the laity, but also against heresy, simony, avarice, and impurity among the secular and regular clergy, provoked the hostility of the clergy, and accusations of heterodoxy were brought against him. It was in vain that Groote emitted a Publica Protestatio, in which he declared that Jesus was the great subject of his discourses, that in all of them he believed himself to be in harmony with Catholic doctrine, and that he willingly subjected them to the candid judgment of the Church.

The bishop was induced to issue an edict which prohibited from preaching all who were not in priestly orders, and an appeal by Groote to Pope Urban VI was without effect. There is a difficulty as to the date of this prohibition; either it was only a few months before Groote's death, or else it must have been removed by the bishop, for Groote seems to have preached in public in the last year of his life.

At some period (perhaps 1381, perhaps earlier) he paid a visit of some days' duration to the famous mystic John Ruysbroeck, prior of the Augustinian canons at Groenendaal near Brussels; during this visit was formed Groote's attraction for the rule and life of the Augustinian canons which was destined to bear notable fruit. At the close of his life he was asked by some of the clerics who attached themselves to him to form them into a religious order and Groote resolved that they should be Canons Regular of St. Augustine. No time was lost in the effort to carry out the project, but Groote died before a foundation could be made.

The initiation of this movement was the great achievement of Groote's life; he lived to preside over the birth and first days of his other creation, the society of Brethren of the Common Life. He died of the plague at Deventer, which he had contracted while nursing the sick, in 1384 at the age of 44. Geert Groote was also a famous writer, who made an important Middle Dutch translation of a book of hours. His translation was used innumerable times throughout the following centuries.

=== The Brethren of the Common Life ===
Young men especially flocked to him in great numbers. Some of these he sent to his schools, others he occupied at transcribing good books, to all he taught thorough Christian piety. Groote and Florence Radewyns, his favourite disciple, founded at Zwolle the Brethren of the Common Life. In 1387 a site was secured at Windesheim, some 24 km (15 mi) north of Deventer, and here was established the monastery that became the cradle of the Windesheim Congregation of canons regular embracing in course of time nearly one hundred houses, and leading the way in the series of reforms undertaken during the 15th century by all the religious orders in Germany. Henceforth his communities, which were spreading rapidly through the Netherlands, Lower Germany, and Westphalia, claimed and received all his attention. He contemplated organizing his clerics into a community of canons regular, but it was left to Radewyns, his successor, to realize this plan at Windesheim two years later.

=== Devotio Moderna ===
A movement known as the Modern Devotion (Devotio Moderna) was founded in the Netherlands by Groote and Florens Radewyns, in the late fourteenth century. For Groote the pivotal point is the search for inner peace, which results from the denial of one's own self and is to be achieved by "ardour" and "silence". This is the heart of the "New Devotion", or the "Devotio moderna". Solitary meditation on Christ’s Passion and redemption, on one’s own death, the Last Judgment, heaven, and hell was essential.

In the course of the 15th century, the Modern Devotion found adherents throughout the Netherlands and Germany. Its precepts were further disseminated in texts such as The Imitation of Christ by Thomas à Kempis, which reached an increasingly literate public. In this context small works of art such as diptychs that provided a focus for private worship enjoyed wide popularity.

== Legacy ==
Geert Groote College is located in Amsterdam.

== See also ==
- Florens Radewyns
- Hendrik Mande

== Sources ==
- This work in turn cites:
  - Thomas à Kempis, Vita Gerardi Magni (English translation by J. P. Arthur, The Founders of the New Devotion, 1905)
  - Chronicon Windeshemense of Johann Busch (ed. K Grube, 1886).

An account, based on the Britannica sources, is in S. Kettlewell, Thomas à Kempis and the Brothers of Common Life (1882), i. c. 5; and a shorter account in F. R. Cruise, Thomas à Kempis, 1887, pt. ii. A sketch, with an account of Groote's writings, is given by L. Schulze in Herzog-Hauck, Realencyklopädie (ed. 3); he insists on the fact that Groote's theological and ecclesiastical ideas were those commonly current in his day, and that the attempts to make him a "reformer before the Reformation" are unhistorical.
