= Congregation of Windesheim =

Roman Catholic religious order for men

- Congregatio Vindesemensis
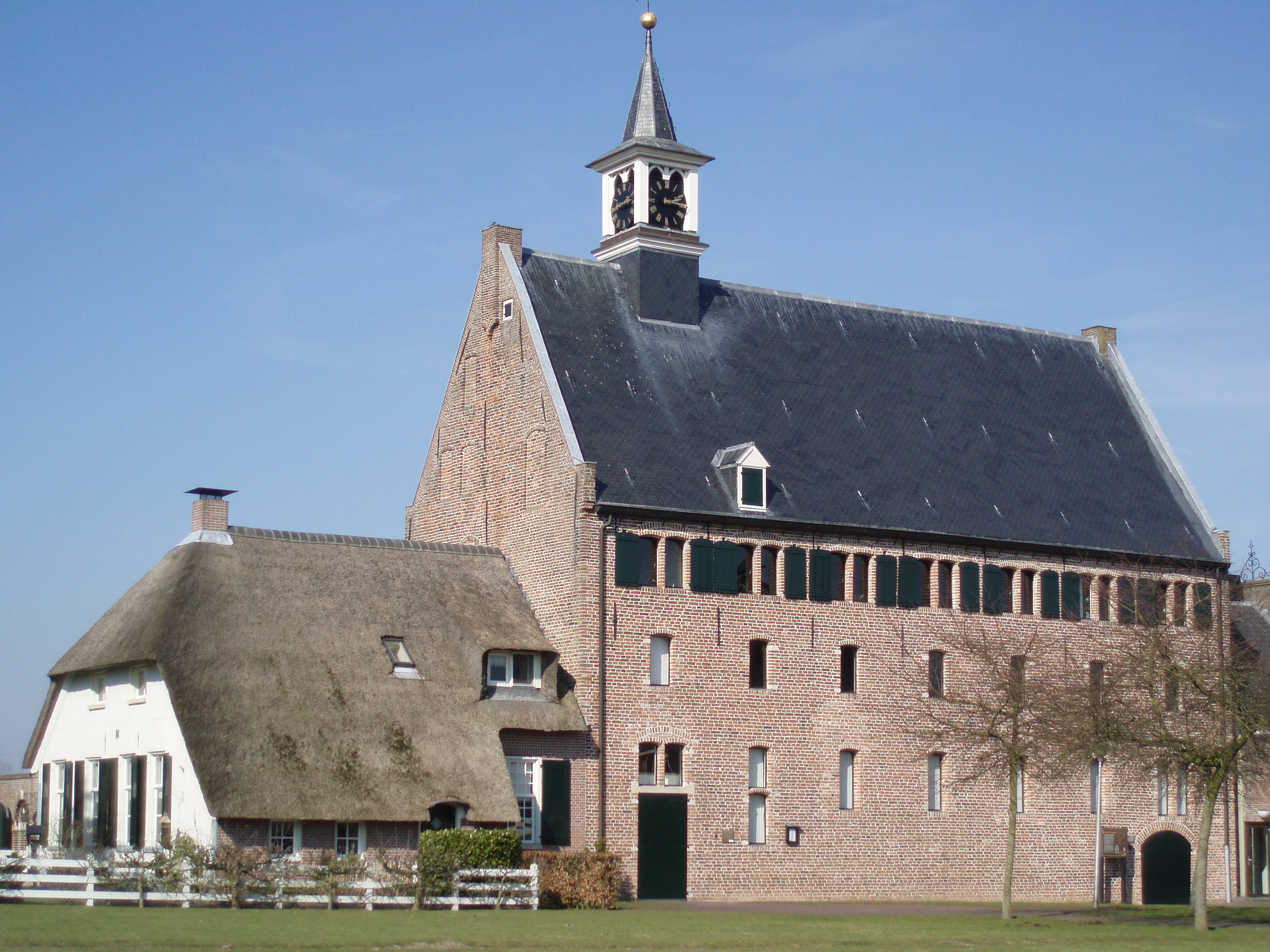
- Modern photo of the former beguinage in Windesheim, Netherlands
- Abbreviation: C.R.V.
- Formation: 1386; 640 years ago
- Founded at: Windesheim, Netherlands
- Type: Order of Canons Regular of Pontifical Right (for Men)
- Headquarters: Propstei St. Michael, Paring 1, D-84085 Langquaid, Germany
- Members: 22 members (12 priests) (2017)
- Prior General: Abbot Olivier Deysine, CRV
- Parent organization: Roman Catholic Church
- Formerly called: Brethren of the Common Life

The Congregation of Windesheim (Latin: Congregatio Vindesemensis) is a congregation of Augustinian canons that regularly takes its name from its most important monastery, which was located at Windesheim in the Netherlands. The congregation was founded as an offshoot of the Brethren of the Common Life and played a considerable part in the reform movement within the Dutch and German Catholic Church in the century before the Protestant Reformation.

== History ==
The Brethren of the Common Life, which did not strictly conform as an order or congregation, had become obnoxious to the mendicant friars and the object of their attacks. To remedy this, their founder, Gerard Groote, advised on his deathbed in 1384 that some of the brethren should adopt the rule of an approved Order. His successor, Florence Radewyns, carried this advice into effect. Six of the brethren, carefully chosen as specially fitted for the work, among them John, elder brother of Thomas à Kempis, were sent to the monastery of Eymsteyn (founded 1382) to learn the usages of the canons regular. In 1386, they erected huts as their temporary monastery at Windesheim, and in March of the following year commenced the building of a monastery and church, which were consecrated by Hubert Lebene, titular Bishop of Hippo and auxiliary bishop of Utrecht, on 17 October 1387. At the same time the six men took their vows. They adopted the apostolate of hospitality.

Under Johann Vos, the second prior (1391–1424), the number of canons greatly increased and many new foundations were made. The first of these were Marienborn near Arnhem and Nieuwlicht near Hoorn (1392). The congregation was approved and received certain privileges from Pope Boniface IX in 1395. Their constitutions, added to the Rule of St. Augustine, were approved by Pope Martin V at the Council of Constance.

Unlike other congregations of canons regular, those of Windesheim followed a monastic life as if they were an enclosed religious order, but they were not. The life of the canons was strict, but not over-severe. A postulant was asked if he could sleep well, eat well, and obey well, since, "...these three points are the foundation of stability in the monastic life." Their constitutions exhibit in many points the influence of the Carthusian statutes. The canons wore a black or grey mozzetta and rochet over a grey tunic.

While other groups of canons regular followed the Benedictine practice of being totally autonomous communities, Windesheim followed the example of the newer Orders, such as the Carthusians and Dominicans, and adopted a more centralized form of government. Like the Carthusians, Windesheim broke from the standard practice in monastic life by having all members of the congregation subject to the Prior General, who could transfer them from one house to another as needed. The prior of Windesheim was initially automatically the Prior General, or head of the congregation, with considerable powers. After 1573 the Prior General was elected from among the priors of the various monasteries.

When the Windesheim Congregation reached the height of its prosperity towards the end of the fifteenth century, it numbered 86 houses of canons and sixteen of nuns, mostly situated in what is the Netherlands, and in the ecclesiastical province of Cologne. Those that survived the Reformation (they still numbered 32 in 1728) were suppressed at the end of the 18th or beginning of the 19th century. Uden in the Netherlands was the only survivor at the early 20th century.

The rise of Protestantism augured the decline of the Windesheim canons since their contemplative life relied heavily on the local population for vocations and support. As Calvinism swept through the Netherlands in particular, support for the canons dwindled. Sometimes this rejection even burst into violence and destruction. Windesheim, the mother house was destroyed in 1581 and there were many martyrs including St. Jan of Osterwijk.

The destruction of Windesheim itself began in 1572, when the altars in the church were destroyed by the people of Zwolle; the suppression of that priory came in 1581. There are practically no remains of the buildings. The last prior of Windesheim, Marcellus Lentius (d. 1603), never obtained possession of this monastery.

== Reforming efforts ==
The chief historical importance of the Windesheim Canons lies in their reforming work. This was not confined to the reform of monasteries, but was extended to the secular clergy and the laity, whom they especially sought to bring to greater devotion toward the Blessed Sacrament and more frequent communion. The chief of the Windesheim monastic reformers, Johann Busch (1399–1480), was admitted to Windesheim in 1419. At the chapter of 1424, Prior Johann Vos, who knew his own end was near, especially entrusted Busch and Hermann Kanten with the carrying out of his work of reform (Chron. Wind., 51). Grube gives a list of forty-three monasteries (twenty-seven Augustinian, eight Benedictine, five Cistercian and three Premonstratensian), in whose reform Busch had a share. Perhaps his greatest accomplishment was the winning to the side of reform of Dom Johann Hagen, O.S.B., for thirty years (1439–69) the Abbot of Bursfelde Abbey and the initiator of the Benedictine union known as the Bursfelde Congregation. In 1451, Busch was entrusted by his friend Cardinal Nicholas of Cusa, papal legate of Pope Nicholas V, with the reform of the Augustinian monasteries in northern Germany, and with such labours he was busied till shortly before his death.

Similar work on a smaller scale was carried out by other Windesheimers. Some Protestant writers have claimed the Windesheim reformers as forerunners of the Protestant Reformation. This is a misapprehension of the whole spirit of the canons of Windesheim; their object was the reform of morals, not the overthrow of dogma. The conduct of the communities of Windesheim and Mount St. Agnes (near Zwolle), who preferred exile to the non-observance of an interdict published by Pope Martin V, exemplifies their spirit of obedience to the Holy See.

Though devastated by the destruction of the Reformation on the houses of the congregation in the Lowlands, the houses in German lands continued and a new spirit flourished there in the 17th century. The canons ceased leading purely contemplative lives and began to engage in pastoral activity, working to make the Catholic faith strong in the now largely-Protestant towns where they lived. At that time, they formed a union with the Canons Regular of the Lateran in Italy.

The events of the French Revolution worked to end the life of the congregation. First, their houses in the Lowlands under the control of Emperor Joseph II of Austria were closed. Then the armies of Revolutionary France invaded that territory and the last house, that of Frenswegen, was closed in 1809. The last member of the congregation, Clemens Leeder, died in Hildesheim in 1865.

== Famous members and works ==
The canons of Windesheim numbered many writers, besides copyists and illuminators. Their most famous author was Thomas à Kempis. Besides ascetical works, they also produced a number of chronicles, such as the "Chronicle of Windesheim" by Johann Busch, after retiring from his reforming labors. An emendation of the Vulgate Bible text and of the text of various Church Fathers was also undertaken. Gabriel Biel, "the last German scholastic", was a member of the congregation, as was the Renaissance scholar Erasmus.

=== Notable members ===
- Jacomijne Costers (d. 1503)

== Revived congregation ==
The revival of the congregation was proposed under the pontificate of Pope Pius XII, by Father Carl Egger. Permission for this was granted by Pope John XXIII in 1961. The motherhouse of the restored congregation is now in Paring Abbey, in Bavaria, Germany. The congregation is a member of the Confederation of the Canons Regular of St. Augustine.

The monastery that houses St. Michael's Priory was bought in 1974 by the Canons Regular of the newly refounded Congregation of Windesheim, and is the motherhouse of the revived congregation. The buildings had been owned by a farmer during the 19th century, and were in disrepair.

== See also ==
- Canons Regular
- Hendrik Mande
