= Thomas à Kempis =

German canon regular (c. 1380–1471)

The Reverend Thomas à Kempis CRV
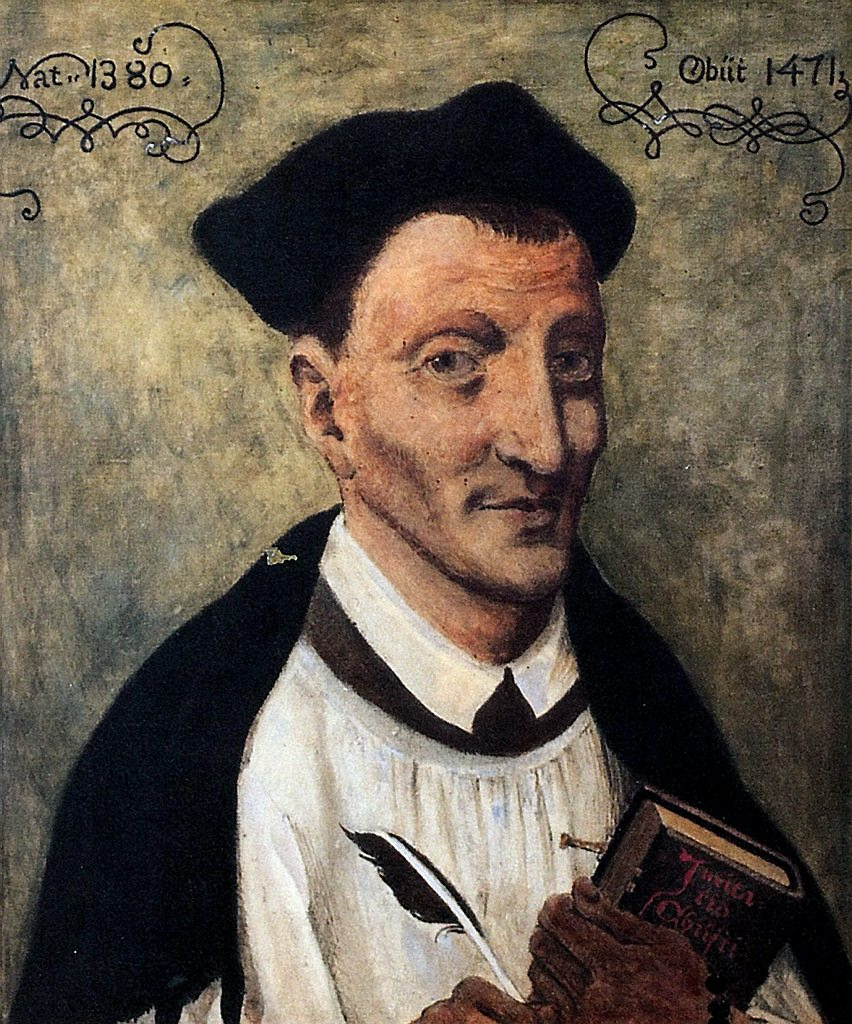
- Born: c. 1380; Kempen, Prince-Archbishopric of Cologne, Holy Roman Empire
- Died: 1 May 1471 (aged 90–91); Zwolle, Bishopric of Utrecht, Holy Roman Empire
- Venerated in: Catholicism; Anglicanism; Lutheranism
- Major shrine: Onze-Lieve-Vrouw-ten-Hemelopnemingkerk
- Feast: 30 August
- Influences: Plato, Aristotle, Socrates, Saint Augustine, Saint Thomas Aquinas, Joan of Arc, Dante Alighieri, Paul the Apostle, Geert Groote, Florens Radewyns, Henry Suso
- Influenced: Alexander Hegius von Heek, Thérèse of Lisieux, Thomas More, John Fisher, Ignatius of Loyola, Erasmus, Edmund Burke, Joseph De Maistre, Thomas Merton, John Wesley, José Rizal, Swami Vivekananda, Shailer Mathews, Søren Kierkegaard, George Preca
- Major works: The Imitation of Christ

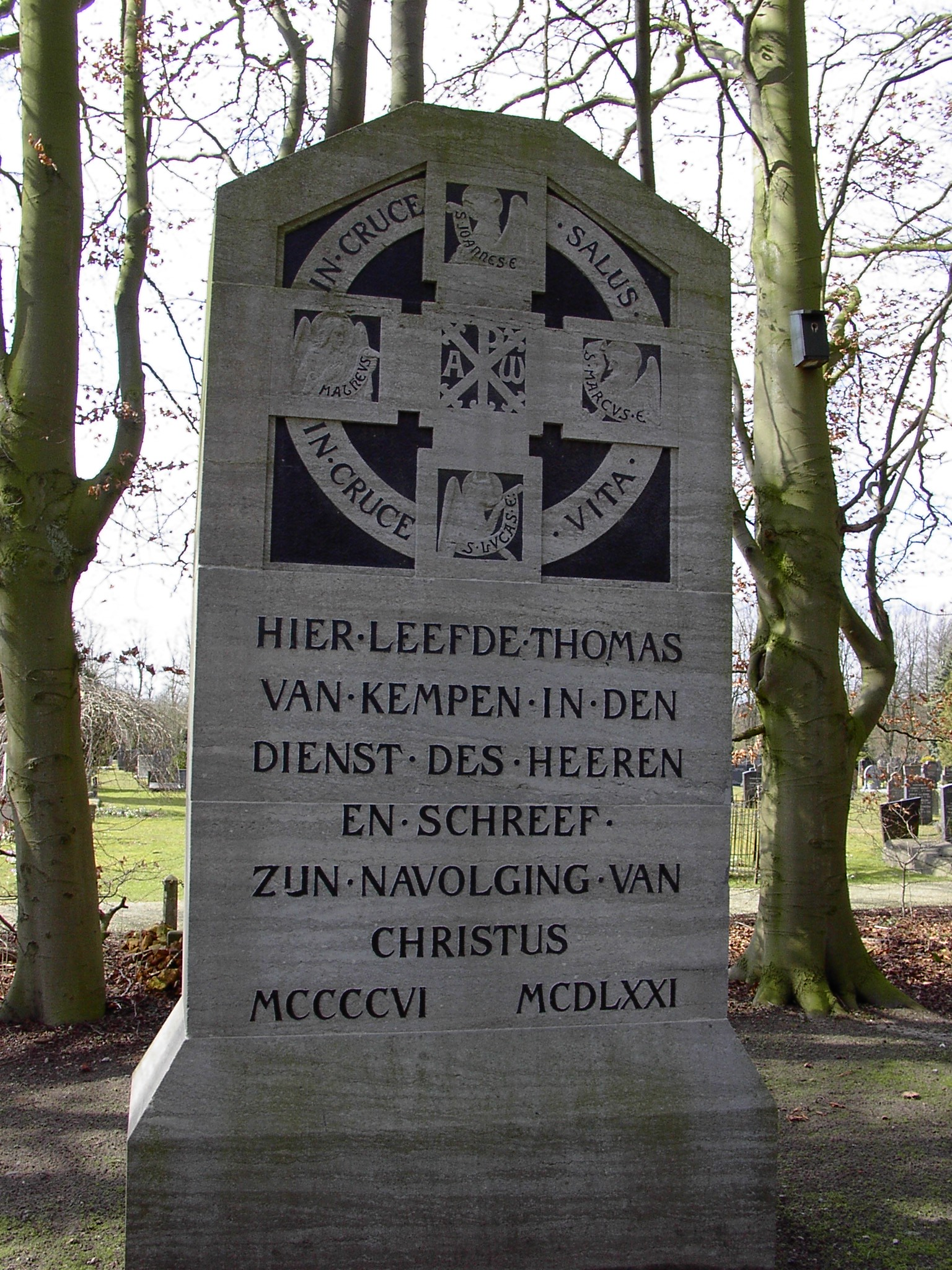
Monument on Mount Saint Agnes in Zwolle "Here lived Thomas van Kempen in the service of the Lord and wrote his Imitation of Christ, 1406–1471"

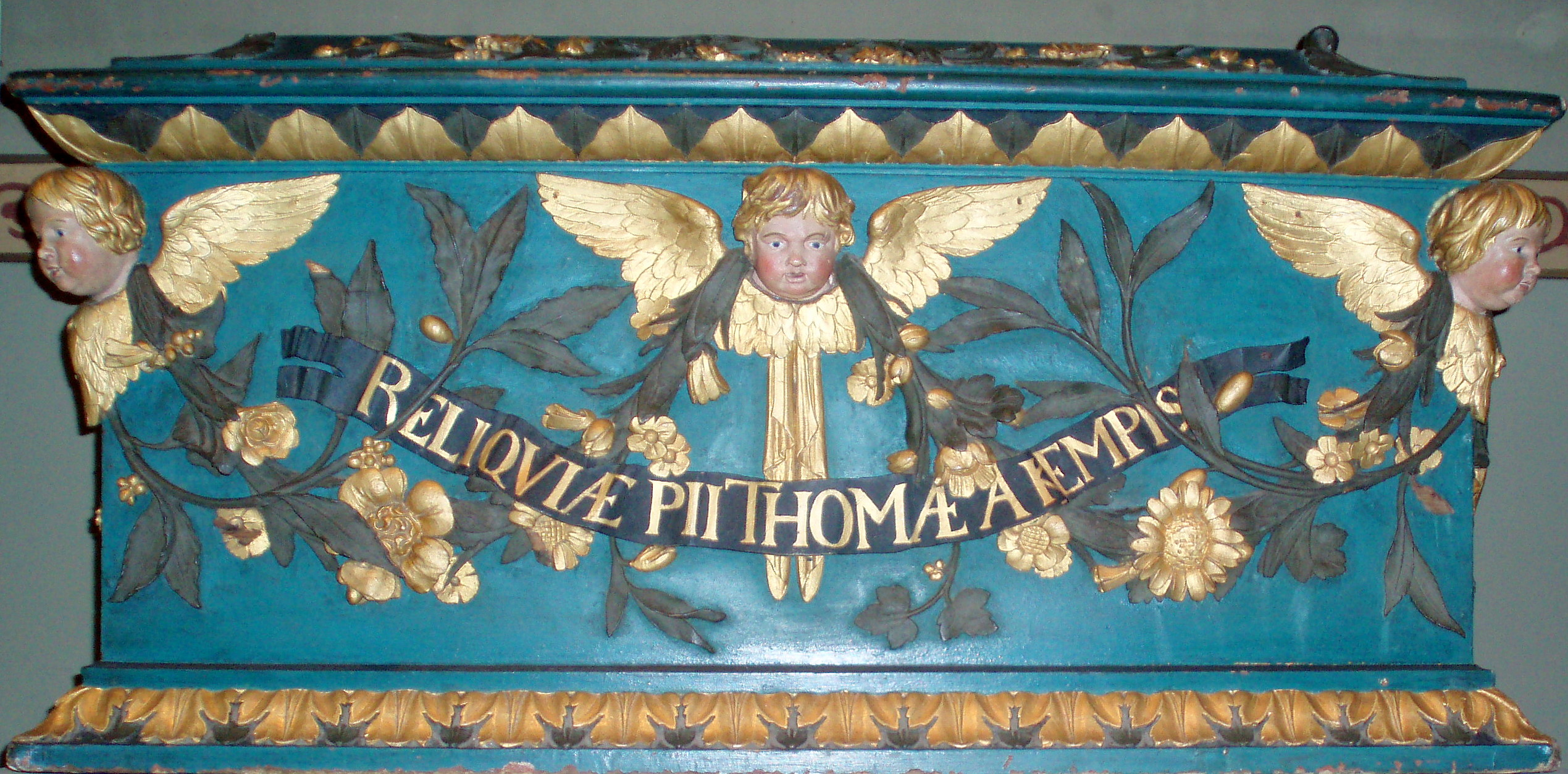
The reliquary with the relics of Thomas à Kempis

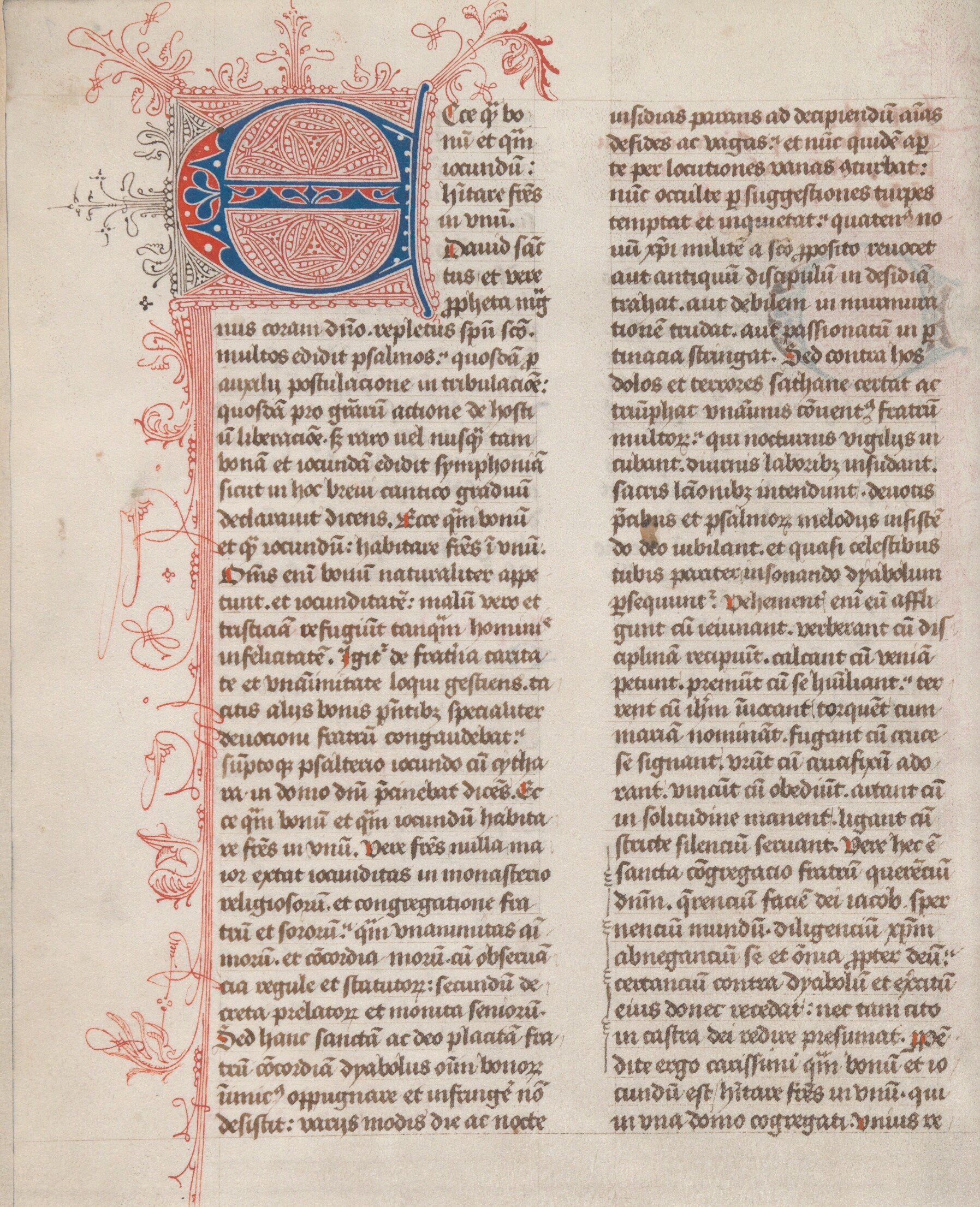
Excerpt from the manuscript "Opera" (Works), written by Thomas à Kempis in the 2nd half of the 15th century

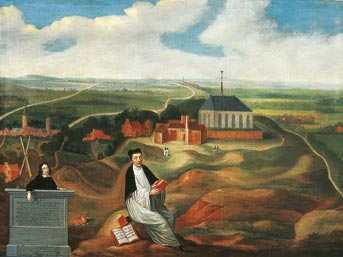
Thomas à Kempis on Mount Saint Agnes – (1569)

Thomas à Kempis (c. 1380 – 1 May 1471; German: Thomas von Kempen; Dutch: Thomas van Kempen) was a German-Dutch Catholic canon regular of the Augustinians and the author of The Imitation of Christ, one of the best known Christian devotional books. His name means "Thomas of Kempen", Kempen, Germany, being his home town.

He was a member of the Congregation of Windesheim, which was part of the Modern Devotion, a reform movement during the late medieval period. Therein, he was a follower of Geert Groote and Florens Radewyns, the founders of the Brethren of the Common Life, of which the Windesheim Augustinians were an offshoot.

== Life ==
Thomas was born in Kempen in the Rhineland. His surname at birth was Hemerken (or Hammerlein, Latinized as Malleolus). His father, Johann, was a blacksmith, and his mother, Gertrud, was a schoolmistress. In his writings he signed himself "Thomas Kempensis" or "Thomas Kempis".

In 1392, Thomas followed his brother, Johann, to Deventer in the Netherlands in order to attend the noted Latin school there. While attending this school, Thomas encountered the Brethren of the Common Life, followers of Gerard Groote's Modern Devotion. He attended school in Deventer from 1392 to 1399.

After leaving school, Thomas went to the nearby city of Zwolle to visit his brother again, after Johann had become the prior of the Monastery of Mount St. Agnes there. This community was one of the Canons Regular of the Congregation of Windesheim, founded by disciples of Groote in order to provide a way of life more in keeping with the norms of monastic life of the period. Thomas himself entered Mount St. Agnes in 1406. He was not ordained a priest, however, until almost a decade later. He became a prolific copyist and writer. Thomas received Holy Orders in 1413 and was made sub-prior of the monastery in 1429.

His first tenure of office as subprior was interrupted by the exile of the community from Agnetenberg in 1429. A dispute had arisen in connection with an appointment to the vacant See of Utrecht. Pope Martin V rejected the nomination of Bishop-elect Rudolf van Diepholt, and imposed an interdict. The Canons remained in exile in observance of the interdict until the question was settled in 1432. During this time, Thomas was sent to Arnhem to care for his ailing brother, where he remained until his brother died in November 1432.

Otherwise, Thomas spent his time between devotional exercises in writing and in copying manuscripts. He copied the Bible no fewer than four times, one of the copies being preserved at Darmstadt, Germany, in five volumes. In its teachings he was widely read and his works abound with biblical quotations, especially from the New Testament.

As subprior he was charged with instructing novices, and in that capacity wrote four booklets between 1418 and 1427, later collected and named after the title of the first chapter of the first booklet: The Imitation of Christ. Thomas More said it was one of the three books everybody ought to own. Thirteen translations of The Imitation of Christ and three paraphrases in English seem to have been published between 1500 and 1700. Thomas died near Zwolle in 1471. There is a legend that he was denied canonization some 200 years after his death by the Catholic Church due to the presence of scratch marks on the interior of his coffin lid, which supposedly disqualifies him from sainthood as it would mean he did not peacefully embrace death. However, there is scant evidence to support that he was buried alive or the idea that the Church would have denied him sainthood if they did discover he died in this manner.

== Works ==
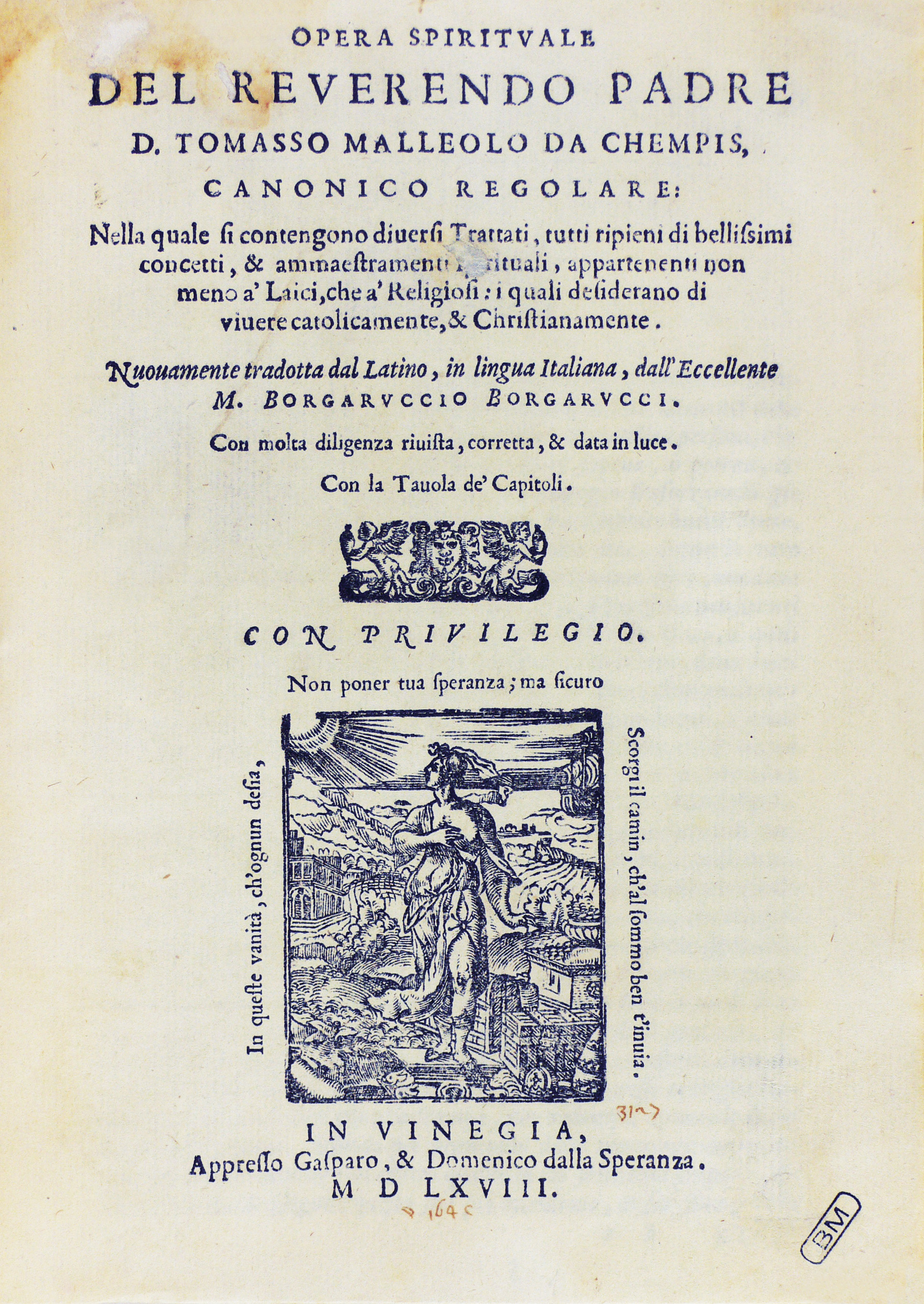
Opera spirituale, 1568

Kempis's 1441 autograph manuscript of The Imitation of Christ is available in the Bibliothèque Royale in Brussels (shelfmark: MS 5455-61).

He also wrote the biographies of New Devotion members—Gerard Groote, Floris Radewijns, Jan van de Gronde, and Jan Brinckerinck. His important works include a series of sermons to the novices of St. Augustine Monastery, including Prayers and Meditations on the Life of Christ, Meditations on the Incarnation of Christ, Of True Compunction of Heart, Soliloquy of the Soul, Garden of Roses, Valley of Lilies, and a Life of St. Lidwina of Schiedam.

- Thomas à Kempis (2007), The Imitation of Christ, Filiquarian, ISBN 978-1-59986-979-7
- Thomas à Kempis (2005), The Imitation of Christ: A Spiritual Commentary and Reader's Guide, Ave Maria Press, ISBN 0-87061-234-4
- Thomas à Kempis (1989), William C. Creasy (ed.), The Imitation of Christ, Mercer University Press, ISBN 0-86554-339-9
- Thomas à Kempis (1955), Harold C. Gardner, S.J. (ed.), The Imitation of Christ, Doubleday, ISBN 978-0-375-70018-7

== Quotations ==
The following quotes are attributed to him:

And when he is out of sight, quickly also is he out of mind.

— The Imitation of Christ, Book I, ch. 23

Without the Way, there is no going,
Without the Truth, there is no knowing,
Without the Life, there is no living.

If thou wilt receive profit, read with humility, simplicity, and faith, and seek not at any time the fame of being learned.

At the Day of Judgement we shall not be asked what we have read, but what we have done.

— The Imitation of Christ, Book I, ch. 3

For man proposes, but God disposes

— The Imitation of Christ, Book I, ch. 19

If, however, you seek Jesus in all things, you will surely find Him.

— The Imitation of Christ, Book II, ch. 7

O quam cito transit gloria mundi,

Oh how quickly the glory of the world passes away!

— The Imitation of Christ, Book I, ch. 3, line 6. Suggested as the origin of the phrase "Sic transit gloria mundi,"
"Thus passes the glory of the world."

In angello cum libello [with slight variations]

In a little corner with a little book

— Shortened form of a motto often ascribed to, or associated with, Thomas a Kempis. The complete saying as reported by an early biographer is a mixture of Latin and Dutch and runs as follows: "In omnibus requiem quaesivi, sed non inveni, nisi in hoexkens ende boexkens," "I have sought everywhere for peace, but I have found it not, save in nooks and in books." (Note: Franciscus Tolensis, Vita Thomae a Kempis, 12: "Ostenditur adhuc ejus effigies, sed admodum deformata poenèque obliterata, cum hoc insigni symbolo, In omnibus requiem quaesivi, sed non inveni, nisi in hoexkens ende boexkens: Hoc est, in abditis recessibus & libellulis." (Eusebius Amort 1759, p. 29))

== Veneration ==
A monument was dedicated to his memory in the presence of the archbishop of Utrecht in St Michael's Church, Zwolle, on 11 November 1897. In 1964, this church closed, causing his shrine to be moved to a new St Michael's Church outside the centre of Zwolle. In 2005, this church also closed and his shrine was moved to the Onze-Lieve-Vrouw-ten-Hemelopneming kerk (Assumption of Mary church) in the centre of Zwolle.
