= Brethren of the Common Life =

14th-century Roman Catholic community

The Brethren of the Common Life (Latin: Fratres Vitae Communis, FVC) was a Roman Catholic pietist religious community founded in the Netherlands in the 14th century by Gerard Groote, formerly a successful and worldly educator who had had a religious experience and preached a life of simple devotion to Jesus Christ. They believed that Christianity should be practiced not only in formal religious settings, but also in everyday life, and they sought to promote a practical spirituality that emphasized personal piety and devotion.

Without taking up irrevocable vows, the Brethren or Sisters banded together in communities, giving up their worldly goods to live chaste and strictly regulated lives in common houses, devoting every waking hour to attending divine service, reading and preaching of sermons, labouring productively such as by copying manuscripts, and taking meals in common that were accompanied by the reading aloud of Scripture: "judged from the ascetic discipline and intention of this life, it had few features which distinguished it from life in a monastery", observes Hans Baron, yet still interacting with the wider community to a certain extent. The Brethren were specially involved in youth education, running or chaplaining many schools and associated hostels. Priests in a brotherhouse would become confessors for the neighbouring sisterhouse.

The Brethren of the Common Life were an important religious movement of the late Middle Ages and the Renaissance, and their emphasis on education, personal piety, and social justice had a profound influence on the religious and intellectual culture of Europe. Over time, the communities took on a more conventional monastic character as observantist canons, monks and nuns.

== Cornerstones ==
The four cornerstones of the Brethren were

- contempt of the world and of self (Latin: contemptus mundi et sui ipsius),
- imitation of the lowly life of Christ (Latin: imitatio humilis vitae Christi),
- good-will (Latin: bona voluntas), and
- the grace of devoutness (Latin: gratia devotionis)

The Confraternity of the Common Life were in many ways similar to the Beghard and Beguine communities which had flourished two centuries earlier but were by then declining. Its members took no vows and neither asked nor received alms; their first aim was to cultivate the interior life, and they worked for their daily bread.

The antifraternal insistence on work distinguishes the Brethren from mendicant (begging) friars; they were attacked by mendicant theologians at the Council of Constance for not having mainstream formal vows initially, but were successfully defended by Pierre d'Ailly and Jean Gerson.

== Devotio Moderna ==
The Brethren's confraternity is the best known fruits of the "Devotio Moderna", (the Modern Devotion), a lifestyle and undogmatic form of piety which some historians have argued helped to pave the road for the Protestant Reformation. In the fifteenth century, the movement spread to southern and western Germany. The Protestant Reformers, including Martin Luther and John Calvin, were influenced by the ideas and practices of the Devotio Moderna.

== Gerard Groote ==
Of wealthy burgher stock, Groote was born in Deventer in the Oversticht possession of the Duchy of Guelders in 1340. Having read at Cologne, at the Sorbonne, and at Prague, he took orders and obtained preferment, a canon's stall at Utrecht and another at Aachen. His relations with the German Gottesfreunde and the writings of John of Ruusbroec, who later became his friend, gradually inclined him to mysticism, and on recovering from an illness in 1373, he resigned his prebends, bestowed his goods on the Carthusians of Arnhem and lived in solitude for seven years.

Feeling himself constrained to go forth and preach, Groote went from place to place calling men to repentance, proclaiming the beauty of Divine love, and bewailing the relaxation of ecclesiastical discipline and the degradation of the clergy. The effect of his sermons was marvelous; thousands hung on his words.

A small band of followers attached themselves to Groote and became his fellow workers, thus becoming the first "Brethren of the Common Life" (Dutch: Broeders des gemeenen levens). The reformer was opposed by many, including the clergy, for his preaching on moral decadence, and in 1383 his license to preach was revoked. Nonetheless, his zeal for purifying the Catholic faith and the morality of its followers won many to his cause. Members of the secular clergy even enrolled themselves in his brotherhood, which, in due course, was approved by the Pope.

== Windesheim Congregation ==
Groote, however, did not live long enough to finish the work he had begun. He died in 1384 and was succeeded by Florens Radewyns, who two years later refounded the famous monastery of Augustinian canons at Windesheim, near Zwolle, which was now the centre of the new association.

== Education and activity ==
The majority of the Brethren were laymen who did go on to not take monastic vows, but they did sign their possessions away to common use on entering the community. They devoted themselves to doing charitable work, chaplaining schools, nursing the sick, studying and teaching the Scriptures, and copying religious and inspirational works. They founded or supported a number of schools that became famous for their high standards of learning. Many famous men attended these schools, including Nicholas of Cusa, Thomas à Kempis, and Erasmus, all of whom studied at the Brethren-associated school at Deventer.

Books and the library were central to the communities of Brethren, whose scrupulous copies of works of piety supported their houses and put the texts in which they found spiritual sustenance in many hands. The houses of the brothers and sisters occupied themselves with literature and education, though not academic theology, and their priests also with preaching. Lay brothers rarely then became priests, however the Brethren encouraged students to become clerics or monks.

When Groote began, education in the Netherlands was still rare, unlike in Italy and the southern parts of the Holy Roman Empire of the German Nation; the University of Leme of the schools of Liège was only a vague memory. Apart from some of the clergy who had studied at the universities and cathedral schools in Paris or in Cologne, there were few scholars in the land; even amongst the higher clergy there were many who were ignorant of the scientific study of Latin, and the ordinary burgher of the Dutch cities was quite content if, when his children left school, they were able to read and write the Medieval Low German and Diets.

Groote determined to change all that. The Brethren worked consistently in the scriptorium; afterwards, with the printing press, they were able to publish their spiritual writings widely. Among them are to be found the best works of 15th-century Flemish prose.

The Brethren were specially involved in youth education, running many schools and associated hostels: in the early 1500s Brethren in Zwolle built a large a house which would hold 200 poor schoolboys. The Brethren spared no pains to obtain good masters, if necessary from foreign countries, for their schools, which became centres of spiritual and intellectual life of the Catholic Church; amongst those whom they trained or who were associated with them were men like Thomas à Kempis, Dierick Maertens, Gabriel Biel, the physician Vesalius, Jan Standonck (1454–1504), priest and reformer, Master of the Collège de Montaigu in Paris, and the Dutch Pope Adrian VI.

Another famous student of the Brethren of the Common Life was Desiderius Erasmus of Rotterdam. His mystical and scholarly efforts produced many works of literature. One of his greatest contributions to the Christian faith was a critical Greek New Testament (1514) which challenged the previous New Testament text translations (specifically the Vulgate). Commonly called Erasmus, he embraced ecclesiastical structure yet challenged Luther's version of the Augustinian view on pre-destination (that due to total depravity, people cannot choose God, but God is the only one who brings people into grace and salvation), the nature of the human will, and the corruption and problems in parts of the late medieval church. He rarely mentioned the Brethren or the devotio moderna; his ad fontes ideology made him little interested in any theology or religion from his millennium, however there are many major points of contact between his thought and the devotio moderna.

Martin Luther studied under the Brethren of the Common Life at Magdeburg before going on to the University of Erfurt.

Through the trade connections of the Dutch Hanseatic cities Deventer and Zwolle the ideas of the Modern devotion spread over the whole of the Hanseatic trade area. Before the fifteenth century closed, the Brethren of the Common Life had placed in all Germany and the Netherlands schools in which teaching was offered "for the love of God alone."

Gradually the course of study, at first elementary, embraced the humanities, philosophy, and theology. The religious orders were not impressed, as the Brethren were neither monks nor friars, but they were protected by Popes Eugene IV, Pius II, and Sixtus IV. The Brethren generally resisted efforts to make them formally a religious order rather than a fraternity, and to cloister the sisters, but nevertheless became progressively more order-like.

Cardinal Nicholas of Cusa may have been their pupil and so became their staunch protector and benefactor. He was also the patron of Rudolph Agricola (Rudolf de Boer), who in his youth at Zwolle had studied under Thomas à Kempis; and through this connection the Brethren of the Common Life, through Cusa and Agricola, influenced Erasmus and other adepts in the New Learning.

More than half of the crowded schools —(in 1500, Deventer had over two thousand students) were swept away in the religious troubles of the sixteenth century. Others languished until the French Revolution, while the rise of universities, the creation of diocesan seminaries, and the competition of new teaching orders gradually extinguished the schools that regarded Deventer and Windesheim as their parent establishments.

=== Impact ===
A 2016 study in the Economic Journal finds that the Brethren of the Common Life "contributed to the high rates of literacy, to the high level of book production and to city growth in the Netherlands."

== Lutheran community in Herford ==
Of the hundred or so men's and women's houses, only a single community adopted Lutheranism at the Reformation.

The community of the Brethren in Herford went over bodily to the Reformation, but the local council nonetheless threatened to close their house. The Brethren wrote to Martin Luther 1532, who defended their community life by writing to the council of the city. To Jacob Montanus and Gerhard Wilskamp he wrote in the end of January 1532: "Your way of life, since you teach and live according to the Gospel, pleases me no end". If only "there had been, and today there were more convents like yours!...Abide by your way of life and use it to spread the Gospel (as you do)!" The house of the Brethren of the Common Life in Herford remained in existence as a Lutheran brotherhood until 1841.

== Revived congregation ==
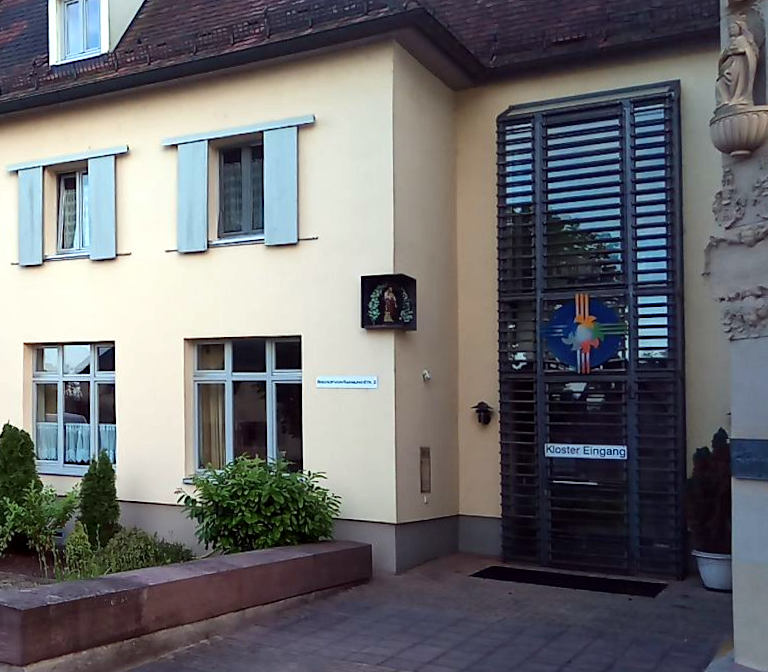
Entrance of the Waghäusel monastery

Since 1975, there is in Germany a revived Congregation of the Brothers of the Common Life, Canonici Regulares Sancti Augustini Fratrum a Vita Communi. It is a constituent member of the Confederation of Canons Regular of St Augustine, its pronominal being CRVC. The superior general of the congregation, Richard Lehmann-Dronke, resides in the motherhouse in Maria Bronnen. Since 2000, the community has also had pastoral care for the Marian shrine of Waghäusel in Nordbaden.

== See also ==
- Canons Regular
- Hendrik Mande
