= Montserrat (given name) =

Montserrat (Catalan pronunciation: [munsəˈrat], [monsəˈrat]), or Maria Montserrat, after the Virgin of Montserrat, is a popular name for girls in Catalonia and several other parts of Catalan-speaking areas. It was the second most common given name for women in Catalonia in 2014, according to the Catalan Statistics Institute.

The name is traditionally abbreviated to Montse, Serrat, Rat, Rateta, Tat or Tóna, and more recently, due to foreign influence, also to Monse.

The name day for Montserrat is celebrated on April 27.

Sometimes this name appears in the Spanish-speaking world as a given name as is, or sometimes translated as Montserrate or Monserrate (where the final "e" is pronounced /e̞/).

== People ==
- Montserrat Abelló (1918–2014), Catalan poet
- Montserrat Artamendi (born 1941), Spanish gymnast
- Montserrat Bassa (born 1965), Spanish politician from Catalonia
- Monserrat Bernabeu Guitart (born 1960), Catalan doctor and mother of former professional footballer Gerard Piqué
- Montserrat Boix (born 1960), Spanish journalist
- Montserrat Caballé (1933–2018), Catalan operatic soprano
- Montserrat Garriga Cabrero (1865–1956), Cuban-Spanish botanist
- Montserrat Carulla (1930–2020), Catalan actress
- Montserrat Cervera Rodon (born 1949), Catalan anti-militarist, feminist, and women's health activist
- Montserrat Cortés Fernández (born 1972), Spanish flamenco singer
- Montserrat Puche Díaz (born 1970), Spanish team handball player and coach
- Montserrat Figueras, Catalan soprano
- Montserrat García (born 1989), Andorran slalom canoer
- Montserrat Gibert (born 1948), former mayor of Sant Boi de Llobregat
- Montserrat Gil Torné (born 1966), Andorran politician
- Montserrat Calleja Gómez (born 1973), Spanish physicist
- Montserrat González (born 1994), Paraguayan tennis player
- Montserrat Grases (1941–1959), Spanish candidate for beatification
- Montserrat Gudiol (1933–2015), Catalonian painter
- Montserrat Guillén (born 1964), Spanish statistician and economist
- Marti Montserrat Guillemat (1906–1990), aka Serramont, Catalan musician
- Montserrat Hidalgo (born 1968), Costa Rican breaststroke swimmer
- Montserrat Julió (1929–2017), Spanish film and television actress
- Montserrat Lombard (born 1982), British actress
- Montserrat Majo (born 1959), Catalan Olympic butterfly swimmer
- Montserrat Marin (born 1968), Spanish handball player
- Montserrat Martí (born 1972), aka Montsita, Spanish soprano
- Montserrat Martín (born 1974), aka Montse, Spanish rhythmic gymnast
- Montserrat Martín Moncusí (born 1966), Spanish archer
- Montserrat Minobis i Puntonet (1942-2019), Catalan feminist journalist
- Montserrat Oliver (born 1966), Mexican fashion model
- Montserrat Pujol (Andorran athlete) (born 1979), Andorran sprinter and long jumper
- Montserrat Pujol (Spanish athlete) (born 1961), Spanish hurdler and runner
- Montserrat Roig (1946–1991), Catalan writer
- Montserrat Ruiz (born 1993), Mexican female mixed martial artist
- Montserrat Sagot, Costa Rican sociologist
- Montserrat Soliva Torrentó (1943-2019), Catalan professor
- Montserrat Teixidor i Bigas (born 1958), Catalan professor at Tufts University
- Montserrat Tomé (born 1982), Spain national football team coach and former midfielder
- Benicio Monserrate Rafael Del Toro Sánchez, Puerto Rican actor
- Montserrat Torrent (born 1926), Catalan organist
- Montserrat Soliva Torrentó (1943–2019), Catalan doctor of chemistry
- Montserrat Tura (born 1954), Catalan surgeon and politician
- Montserrat Vayreda (1924–2006), Catalan poet
- Montserrat Vilà (born 1964), Catalan ecologist

== See also ==
- Montserrat (disambiguation)
- Montserrat (surname)
