= Anselm Viola i Valentí =

Pere Viola i Valentí, better known as Anselm Viola (Torroella de Montgrí, Baix Empordà, 1738 - Santa Maria de Montserrat Abbey, Bages, 25 January 1798), was a composer and teacher of music at the Catalan school of Montserrat. He was of the classic school of composition but with an open mind, as evidenced by his Magnificat in seven voices. He entered the Escolania de Montserrat between 1745 and 1750, where he had Josep Antoni Martí as a teacher, who introduced him to the Italian musical style of the time. It was as a novice of the monastery in 1756 where he took the name of Anselm, and once he had done the monastic profession in Montserrat, he moved to Madrid where he apprenticed to José de Nebra, composer of the court. Later he returned to Montserrat where he dedicated himself to musical education at the School (among his students there was Fernando Sor). His musical output consists of numerous sonatas for harpsichord, of clear pedagogical orientation, and of several religious works. Also worth mentioning are the 18 studies for bassoon solo and, above all, his concerto for bassoon and orchestra, one of the most important of the time for the instrument. He was the author of several sacred works.

== Biography ==
=== Escolania de Montserrat ===
In 1738, at the age of ten, Pere Viola entered the Escolania de Montserrat. Torroella de Montgrí had an important musical tradition and it is likely his earliest musical inclinations developed there. In addition, some of his close relatives also were musicians.

Upon entering Escolania, Viola was a pupil of Benet Esteve, although the true teacher of the boy was the monk Josep Martí. Martí was the composer who led the change of style in that period in Montserrat: he could be considered the progenitor of the Italian style in Montserratine music. This "new style" and pedagogical notes were decisive in the musical formation of Viola. Viola went to Escolania for seven years (up to the age of seventeen or eighteen). There, as with all the students, he received an excellent musical education that was geared towards participation in certain ceremonies of the monastery and sanctuary. One of the main tasks was to take part in the religious functions of the music chapel with the interpretation of the polyphonic works of Montserrat or other renowned composers such as, for example, Joseph Haydn, who had a great influence on Montserratin music during the last third of the eighteenth century.

Pere Violà left Escolania in 1756.

== Benedictine monk ==
After more than seven years in Escolania, he entered as monk in the monastery and took the Benedictine habit on 20 March, 1756. He was called by the name of Anselm. A year later, when he finished the mandatory novitiate, he professed for monastic life on 25 March, 1757. That same year, Narciso Casanovas, who later became a famous composer, joined the choir. The abbot at the time, Maur Salcedo, seeing the musical predisposition of Viola, sent him to Madrid to continue the ecclesiastical studies and to finish his musical education.

=== El Monserratico ===
In 1758, just a year after his profession, Anselm Viola arrived at the monastery of Nuestra Señora de Monserrate in Madrid, known as El Monserratico.

During the approximately ten years of his stay in Madrid he finished the ecclesiastical studies and most probably was ordained a priest. He continued musical studies and was greatly influenced by the musical atmosphere that unfolded in the circles of the court of Charles III of Spain during the beginnings of the reign of that Bourbon monarch.

Viola was influenced by the nucleus of musicians at the Royal Chapel. Through them he internalized the Italian style of the music he had first learned in Montserrat from his teacher Josep Martí. In the Madrid court, the Italian style had replaced the French style since the arrival of Elisabeth Farnese, second wife of Philip V of Spain.

=== School Teacher ===
Between 1763 and 1767/8, Viola returned to the monastery of Montserrat after more than nine years of in Madrid. His musical prestige had grown during the years at the court, as evidenced by the fact that some of his sonatas were incorporated, along with works by Narciso Casanovas or Antonio Soler, in the book "Musical Test of the Monk", by teacher and theorist Pere Codolar.

In 1786, shortly after his return to Montserrat, he was appointed music director at Escolania, a position that had been vacant since the death of his old master Martí, as well as at the chapel of music, positions that he would occupy until his death . The thirty years at Escolania de Montserrat proved to be the time of Viola's greatness, both as director for the school which included overarching management of Montserrat's music, and in his accomplishments as a composer.

=== Illness and death ===
In 1793 he suffered an apoplectic attack that ended his ability to teach the students. He retained, however, the title of master of the music chapel. He died at the nursing home of the monastery on 25 January, 1798.

== As teacher ==
His most important student was guitarist and composer Ferran Sor. It seems that Viola did not react very positively to Sor's enthusiasm for guitar, an instrument for which Viola had little appreciation. Another likely student was the monk Carles Masferrer, for which the Eighteen Studies for Bassoon and the Concert per baix i orquestra must have been written. Another important students were Jacint Boada, Antoni Ràfols, Felip Rodríguez, and Josep Vinyals.

== The composer ==
His facilities as a composer has been little known until recently, when some of his works have been published and some recordings made.

His work represents a conjunction between the Montserratin music tradition - in the line of his predecessors Joan Cererols and Miquel López - and the Italian influence introduced in Montserrat in the mid-18th century and fully assimilated during his stay in Madrid.

His musical production was extensive, but little survives to the destruction of the monastery and the music archive in 1811 and 1812 during the Peninsular War.

The general catalog of works of Viola that have survived shows a variety of different forms: sonatas of binary structure, written with pedagogical functionality, a fugue, masses for choir and orchestra, Eighteen Studies for Bassoon, and a Concerto for bass and orchestra of with a baroque structure, the only example of strictly instrumental music from the School of Montserrat.

== Works ==
Masses:

- Alma Redemptoris Mater
- Scala aretina
- Mass for Five and Nine Voices

Villancico:

- Benaurats aquells qui viuen

Other works in Latin:

- Magnificat for 6 voices
- Magnificat for 7 voices
- Quomodo obscuratum est
- Beatus Vir
- Laetatus Sum

Instrumental works:

- Concerto per baix i orquestra
- Eighteen Exercises for Bassoon
- at least three Sonatas for keyboard

=== Recordings ===
Sonatas 1, 2, and 3 (performed by Paul Bernard, organ) - Muse MAC 9059 side A. (LP record)
