= Montserrat (disambiguation) =

Montserrat is a British Overseas Territory in the Caribbean whose name comes from the Montserrat mountain in Catalonia.

Montserrat or Monserrat may also refer to:

== People ==
- Montserrat (given name)
- Montserrat (surname)

== Places ==
=== Americas ===
- Monserrat, Buenos Aires, a neighborhood in Buenos Aires, Argentina
- Montserrat, a region of Trinidad and Tobago
- Montserrat, Dominican Republic, a municipal district in Baoruco Province
- Montserrat Township, Johnson County, Missouri, township, United States
- Montserrat, Missouri, an unincorporated community, United States

=== Spain ===
- Montserrat (mountain), a mountain in Catalonia, Spain
  - Monistrol de Montserrat, municipality including the monastery and most of the mountain
  - Montserrat (department), the Napoleonic department from 1812 to 1813, during the Peninsular War
  - Olesa de Montserrat, municipality next to the mountain of Montserrat
  - Santa Cecília de Montserrat, a former Benedictine abbey in Marganell (Bages)
  - Santa Maria de Montserrat Abbey, home of:
    - Virgin of Montserrat, a "black Madonna" statue and object of pilgrimage, also patron saint of Catalonia
- Montserrat d'Alcalà, a municipality in Valencia, Spain

== Other ==
- HMS Montserrat (K586), a British frigate in service in the Royal Navy from 1944 to 1946
- Montserrat (album), 2017 album by John Otway
- Montserrat (film), a 1902 Spanish short black-and-white silent documentary film
- Montserrat (play), a 1948 play by Emmanuel Roblès
- Montserrat (typeface), a sans-serif font
- Montserrat College of Art, in Beverly, Massachusetts, United States
- Montserrat station, a commuter rail train station in Beverly, Massachusetts, United States
- "Montserrat" (Hollywood Television Theatre), an American television play

== See also ==
- Cap de la Montserrat cridant, a sculpture by Juli González
- Llibre Vermell de Montserrat, a medieval musical manuscript from the monastery of Santa Maria de Montserrat
- Monsalvat, or Munsalväsche, a place in the Grail legends, a rendering of Monsalvat, associated with Montserrat in Catalonia
- Monserrate, a mountain adjacent to Bogotá, Colombia
- Monserrate & DJ Urba, reggaeton producers
- Monserrate Palace, a palace in Sintra, Portugal
- Nuestra Señora de Montserrat, a church in Madrid, Spain
- Nuestra Señora de Monserrate, a cathedral in Hormigueros, Puerto Rico
- Montferrat, similarly-named Italian region
