= Sebastià Bardolet i Pujol =

Spanish monk (1934–2025)

Sebastià Bardolet i Pujol (13 March 1934 – 16 September 2025) was a Spanish Roman Catholic monk who was abbot of Santa Maria de Montserrat Abbey between 1989 and 2000.

== Biography ==
Bardolet was born in Torelló, Catalonia on 13 March 1934, and was the youngest of eight siblings. He entered the monastery in 1953 and professed his profession there on 6 August 1954. He previously was member of the Escolania de Montserrat, between 1943 and 1948. Bardolet was ordained a priest on 24 September 1960, before graduating in Gregorian chant and musicology from the Pontificio Istituto di Musica Sacra in Rome. He was director of liturgical chant from 1965 to 1968 in Montserrat and then prefect of the choir until 1977. In 1977 he was secretary to the abbot and in 1978 he was appointed prior of the monastery of Montserrat. In 1989, due to the resignation of Abbot Cassià Maria Just, he was elected Abbot of Montserrat.

As abbot, in 1990 he promoted the III Liturgical Congress of Montserrat and in 1995 he had an important participation in the Tarragona Provincial Council. From 1991 to 1996 he renovated the basilica of the monastery and in 1997 he restored the Holy Cave after the fire of 1994. He resigned in April 2000 and was replaced by Josep Maria Soler i Canals. As abbot emeritus, he created the Abbey of Montserrat Foundation 2025 to raise economic funds to reform the architectural complex of Montserrat and its services.

Bardolet died on 16 September 2025, at the age of 91.
