= Santa Cueva =

The name Santa Cueva (Spanish "Holy Grotto") may refer to several places in Spain:

- Santa Cueva de Covadonga, in Principado de Asturias
- Santuario de la Cueva Santa in Altura in Castellón
- Oratorio de la Santa Cueva, church in Cádiz city, in the province of Cádiz
- Cave of Saint Ignatius, in Manresa, in the province of Barcelona
- Santa Cueva de Montserrat, origin of the Virgen de Montserrat (Virgen de la Moreneta) patron saint of Catalonia.
