= Didier Lourenço =

Spanish artist (1968–2023)

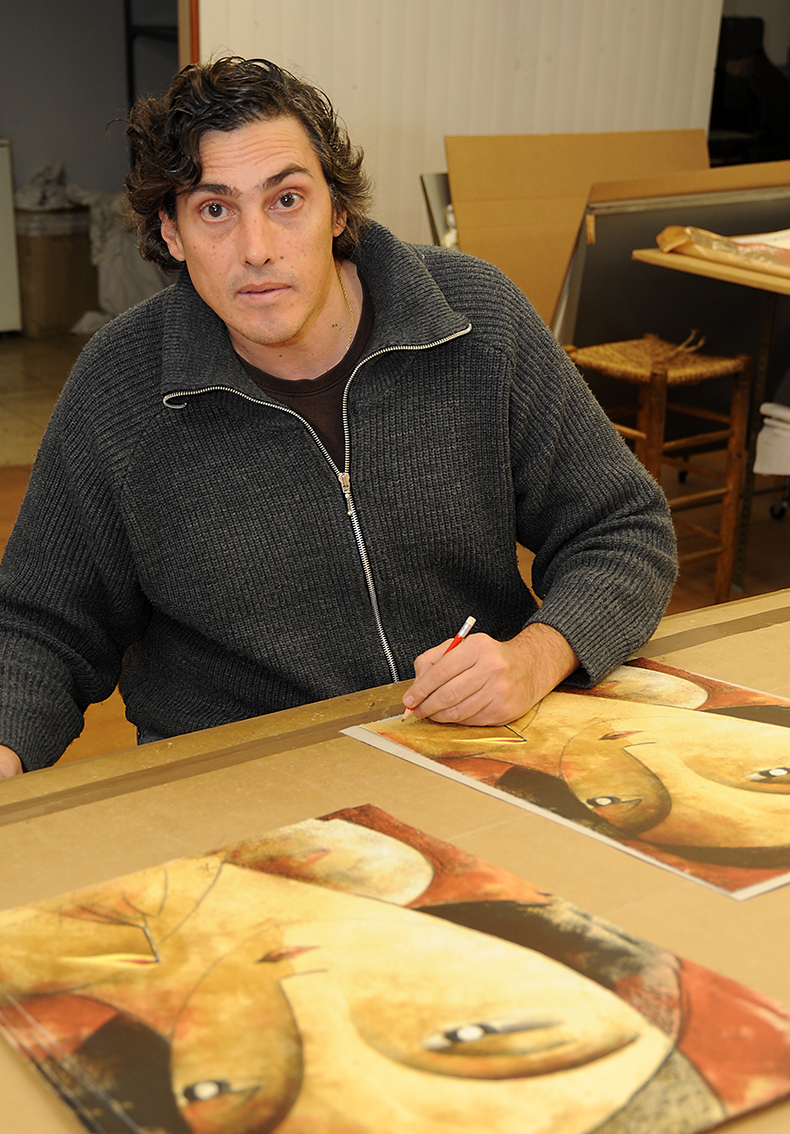
- Lourenço in his Premià de Mar workspace, 2012
- Born: 1968; Premià de Mar, Spain
- Died: 27 July 2023 (aged 55)
- Occupations: Painter, lithographer and sculptor

Didier Lourenço (1968 – 27 July 2023) was a Catalan-Spanish painter.

== Biography ==
His origins as an artist can be found in the lithograph studio of his father, Fulvio, where he began working as an artist at an early age. There, he learned all about lithography and began to develop his first oil paintings, while coming into contact with some of the leading Catalan artists of the late 80s and early 90s such as Josep Maria Subirachs, Francesc Artigau, Josep Pla-Narbona, Javier Montesol, Josep Guinovart, Jordi Alumà, Rafael Bartolozzi Lozano, Perico Pastor i Bodmer, Simo Buson, Montserrat Gudiol, Javier Mariscal, and Joan Pere Viladecans. With these influences, Lourenço, an autodidact artist, began self-defining his creative and very personal style.

In 1991, Lourenço won the Banc Sabadell Prize in the Sala Parés Young Painters contest. With this award he was selected to be a part of a group exhibition, titled "7 New Realities" in Sala Vayreda, in Barcelona. This show was a turning point in the career of Lourenço, and led to many solo exhibits in art galleries around Catalunya. After establishing himself in Barcelona, he quickly began gaining recognition throughout Spain, where his work was shown in cities such as Madrid and Valencia. During this period the artist's work was catapulted into the international market by one of the major art editors in the world.

The first years of this century saw Lourenço gain statewide recognition, while still defining his very personal style. These years also catapulted the artist to the international market thanks to one of the major art poster companies in the world, Winn-Devon.

Thanks to this company, Lourenço's works were reproduced as print collections and distributed and sold worldwide. The success of the painter did not go unnoticed for several art galleries in the United States (New York, Miami, Atlanta, Seattle, Los Angeles, Nashville) and other parts of the globe that became interested in the original paintings.

Didier Lourenço continued to work in his studio in Premia de Mar (Barcelona) and exhibiting his work worldwide, with special recognition during the recent years in Asian countries like South Korea, Singapore and Hong Kong.

Lourenço died of cancer on 27 July 2023, at the age of 55.

== Style ==
As a self-taught artist, Didier Lourenço's work has a very personal and distinctive character, based initially on the Mediterranean landscape, urban landscape and everyday scenes, all of them being elements of the reality surrounding the artist. Over time, his work has evolved into a much more intimate and imaginative work, based on human beings and their emotions. Very important to observe in the works of Lourenço is the richness of nuances and substance built by textures and colors, which give an almost mineral impression.

== Featured lithographies ==
Cliente
Del Monte Fruits
Lindt
Merk
Bassat Ogilvy
Bombers de Barcelona
TV3 25 anys
Gremi de Llibreters
Hiscox
