= Vera Mikol =

American journalist

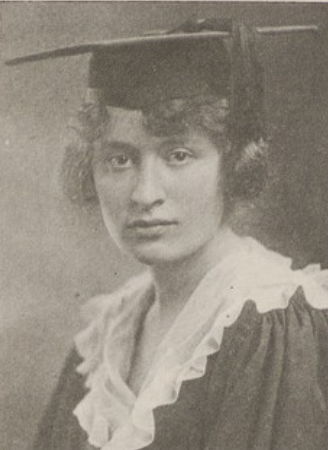
- Vera Mikol, from the 1920 yearbook of Radcliffe College
- Born: November 28, 1899; Chelsea, Massachusetts
- Died: 1982 (aged 82); Santa Barbara, California
- Other names: Vera Mikol Wiese, Vera M. Schuyler
- Occupations: Journalist, researcher
- Spouse(s): Ernst Wiese, Robert Livingston Schuyler

Vera Mikol (November 28, 1899 – 1982), also known as Vera Mikol Wiese and Vera M. Schuyler, was an American journalist and researcher.

== Early life and education ==
Vera Mikol was born in Chelsea, Massachusetts, the daughter of David and Lillie Mikol. Her father was a close acquaintance of William Morris, and active in socialist politics in Boston; he was a leader of the Ladies' Tailors and Dressmakers' Association of America, and he worked as an interpreter for labor leader Samuel Gompers. Her younger sister, Bettina, married David Sinclair, the son of novelist Upton Sinclair.

At age 11, Mikol wrote a four-act play, The Distinguished Princess, which was produced at her school. She graduated from Girls' High School in Boston in 1916. She earned a bachelor's degree from Radcliffe College in 1920. She was secretary of the Radcliffe College chapter of the Intercollegiate Socialist Society. She wrote a story, "The Tower by the Sea", for The Harvard Magazine. She won a scholarship for further studies in France, at the Lycée Jeanne Hachette and the Sorbonne.

After France, she made further studies in Germany and at Columbia University. She was listed as a graduated student in education at the University of California, Los Angeles, in 1939.

== Career ==
In 1926, Mikol was executive assistant to George E. G. Catlin, who chaired a committee studying the "social consequences of the Eighteenth Amendment to the U.S. Constitution" for the Social Science Research Council. From 1930 to 1931, she was a Research Fellow with the Social Science Research Council.

MIkol was a reporter for the New York Daily News, and reported on archaeological finds in Egypt for The New York Times and the Montreal Gazette in 1930. In 1931 she was in Naples, studying piano and possibly working for the United States Foreign Service. She taught in the journalism program at Los Angeles City College.

Mikol was the uncredited research director on dozens of Hollywood films in 1945 and 1946, many of them westerns, thrillers, or comedies. In the 1950s, she presented her research on composer Sigismund Thalberg at a meeting of the American Philosophical Society. She was active in the Los Angeles chapters of Theta Sigma Phi and the Radcliffe Club. Later in life she lived in Palm Springs, and was active in the Opera Guild and the Coachella Valley chapter of the Dickens Fellowship. In the 1970s, she was traveling often, and writing for "golf and art magazines."

== Personal life and legacy ==
Mikol married twice. Her first husband was Austrian journalist Ernst Wiese in 1937. They divorced in 1939. She was living in Pacific Palisades, California in 1957. Her second husband was journalist Robert Livingston Schuyler. She died in Santa Barbara, California in 1982, aged 82 years. The Harvard Radcliffe Institute awards a Vera M. Schuyler Fellowship, named in her memory; novelist Geraldine Brooks, novelist Mako Yoshikawa, historian Steven Zipperstein, anthropologist Nancy Scheper-Hughes, and mathematician Montserrat Teixidor i Bigas are among its past recipients.
