= Josep Gudiol Ricart =

Catalan art historian

José Gudiol Ricart
- Born: Josep Maria Gudiol i Ricart; 1904; Vic, Catalonia, Spain
- Died: 1985 (aged 80–81); Barcelona, Spain
- Other names: José Gudiol, Jose Gudiol
- Known for: Spanish art historian
- Notable work: Ars Hispaniae series
- Children: Montserrat Gudiol

Josep Gudiol i Ricart, also known as José Gudiol in citation (1904–1985), was a Catalan art historian, specializing in Catalan Romanesque painting, Gothic painting and other types of Spanish art.

== Biography ==
Josep Maria Gudiol i Ricart was born in 1904 in Vic, Catalonia, Spain.

Gudiol Ricart published a series of monumental books surveying Spanish art history, the Ars Hispaniae series. The two most important works in the series were, Las Pinturas Murales Románicas de Cataluña (Gudiol and Pijoán, 1948) and Arquitectura y Escultura Románicas (Gudiol and Gaya Nuño, 1948).

He served as director of the Amatller Institute of Hispanic Art (Institut Amatller D'art Hispànic) in Barcelona, Spain.

Gudiol's daughter was the painter Montserrat Gudiol i Corominas (1933–2015).

== Publications ==
- Zervos, Christian; Soldevilla Zubiburu, Fernando; Gudiol, José (1937). L'Art de la Catalogne de la Seconde Moitié du Neuvième Siècle à la Fin du Quinzième Siècle [The Art of Catalonia from the Second Half of the Ninth Century to the End of the Fifteenth Century]. Paris, France: Éditions "Cahiers d'art".
- Gudiol Ricart, Josep (1938). La Pintura Gótica a Catalunya [Gothic Painting in Catalonia]. Vol. 1. Barcelona, Spain: A.D.A.C., Barcelona Col. Monografies d Art Hispànic.
- Cook, Walter W. S.; Gudiol Ricart, José (1950). Ars Hispaniae: Historia Universal del Arte Hispanico; Pintura e Imagineria Romanicas [Ars Hispaniae: Universal History of Hispanic Art, 6th Volume, Roman Painting and Imagery] (in Spanish). Vol. Sexto. Madrid, Spain: Editorial Plus Ultra.
- Gudiol, José (1964). The Arts of Spain. "The World of Art Library" series (1 ed.). London: Thames & Hudson. ISBN 9780500200179.
- Gudiol, José (1984). Goya (in Spanish) (1 ed.). Poligrafa. ISBN 8434304082.
