= Montserrat (surname) =

Montserrat is a surname. Notable people with the surname include:

- Alba Montserrat (born 1984), Catalan football player
- Dolors Montserrat (born 1973), Spanish lawyer and politician
- Dominic Montserrat (1964–2004), British egyptologist and papyrologist
- Enrique Montserrat (born 1935), Spanish gymnast
- Jade Montserrat, British artist and writer
- Joan Sella i Montserrat (born 1960), Catalan journalist
- Joaquín de Montserrat (1700–1771), Valencian viceroy of New Spain
- Josep Montserrat i Torrents (1932–2025), Catalan writer, philosopher, historian and Coptic scholar
- María de Montserrat (1913–1995), Uruguayan writer
- Marti Montserrat Guillemat (1906–1990), Catalan musician
- Nil Montserrat (born 1988), Catalan racing driver
- Ricardo Montserrat (1954–2020), French author
