= Santa Cova de Montserrat =

Mountain in Spain

Coordinates: 41.5882°N 1.8441°E

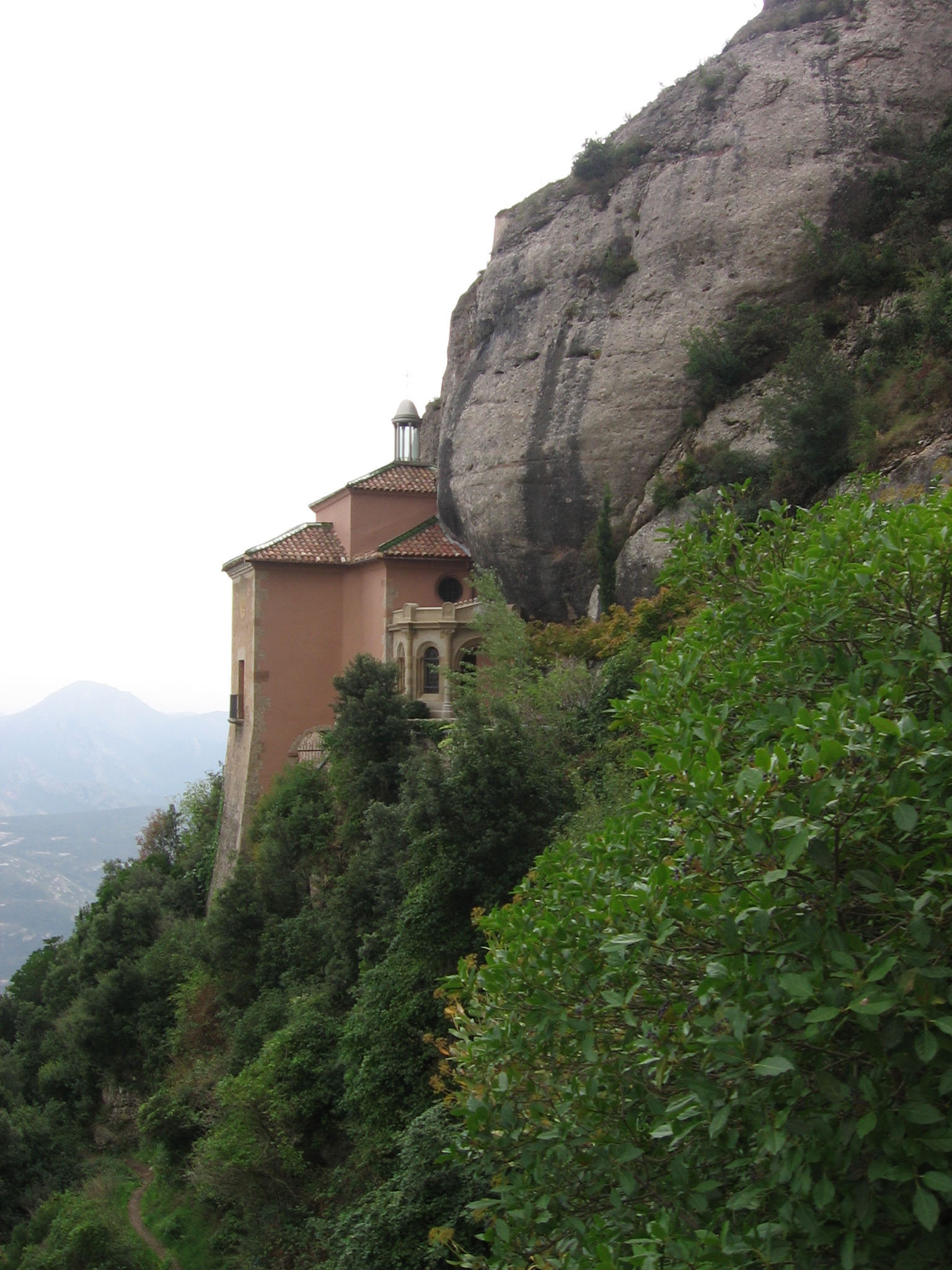
Hermitage of la Santa Cova de Montserrat

The Santa Cova de Montserrat (in Catalan; English: Holy Cave of Montserrat) is the hillside cave on Montserrat where the Virgin of Montserrat was traditionally hidden during the Moorish invasions and later discovered by shepherds in 880. Its discovery made Montserrat into a pilgrimage destination, and led to the founding of the Santa Maria de Montserrat Abbey.

The sanctuary of the Santa Cova is accessed by a path, called the Camí de la Santa Cova, carved along the ridge of the mountain. It was built between 1691 and 1704, thanks to the patronage of Gertrudis de Camporrell, marquess of Tamarit. Between 1896 and 1916, a series of sculptures were placed along the camí, dedicated to the rosary and the 15 mysteries of the Virgin, including works by Antoni Gaudí, Josep Puig i Cadafalch and other modernista artists.

== Legend ==
According to legend, on a Saturday evening in 880, two young shepherds observed a great light descend from heaven and settle halfway up the mountain of Montserrat. The light was accompanied by a beautiful melody. The following week, accompanied by their parents, they saw the same vision again.

The vision continued to repeat in later weeks, even when the boys brought the rector of Olesa de Montserrat. In response, the priest alerted the Bishop of Manresa, and a cave was found which contained the icon of the Virgin Mary. But when a procession tried to move the Virgin down the mountain to Manresa, it became too heavy to carry. This was interpreted as a divine signal that the Virgin should be venerated on Montserrat.

== Chapel of the Santa Cova ==
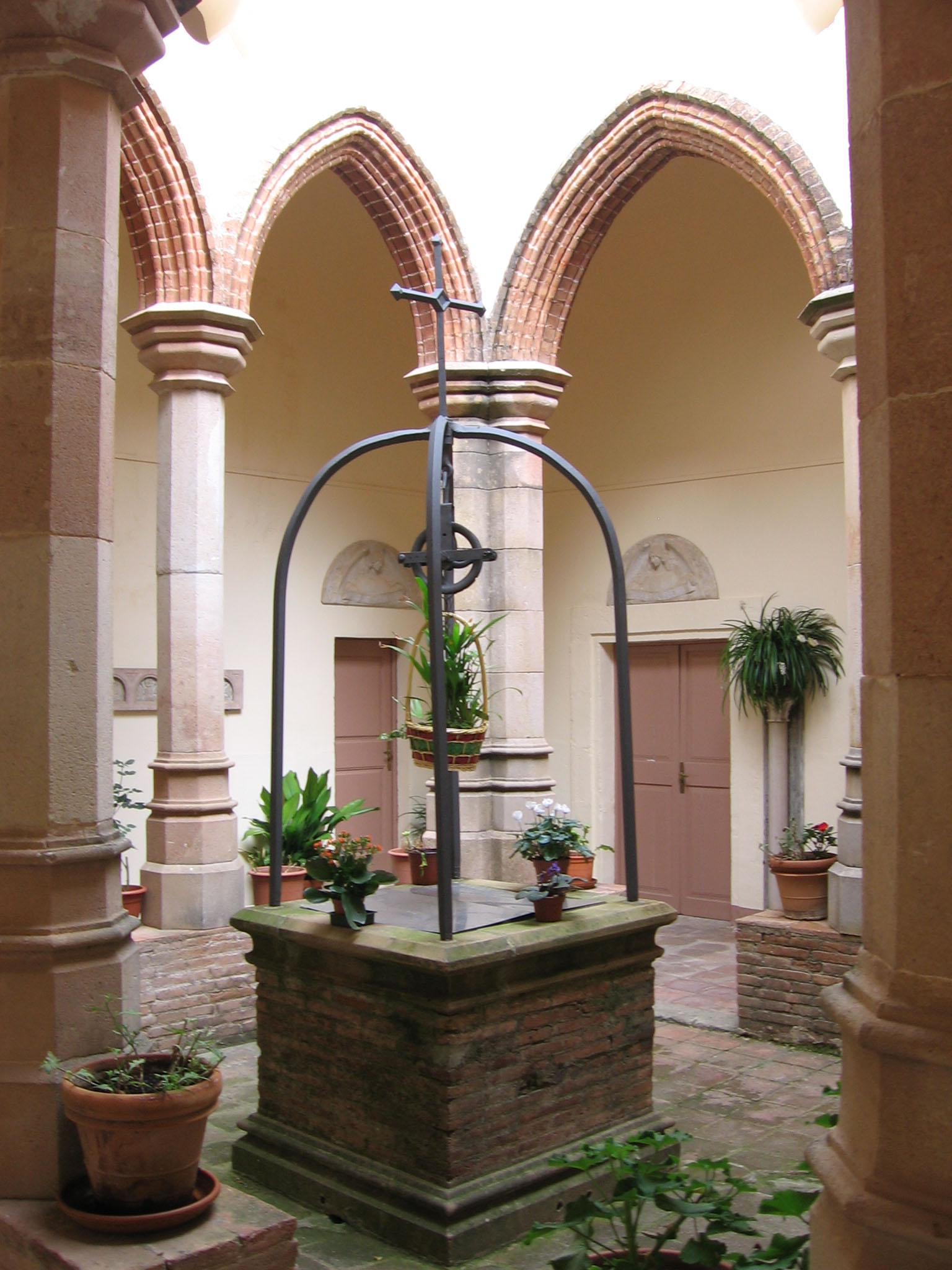
Cloister of the Santa Cova de Montserrat

A chapel was built at the cave between 1696 and 1705, thanks again to the patronage of Gertrudis de Camporrell. Of note is the chapel's vertical orientation atop a steep slope, which serves to emphasize its precipitous location.

The chapel is located just beneath the grotto where the original icon was found, and it was built in the form of a Latin cross. At the crossing is a small dome with a lantern to let in light. Since the original icon is located at the larger abbey, the altar has a reproduction of the Virgin.

Adjacent to the chapel proper is a small cloister, as well as another structure, of three bays, which includes an ex-voto, sacristy, a room for visiting pilgrims, and room for the monk who lives at the sanctuary and welcomes visitors.

Over time, the chapel has been attacked or damaged on numerous occasions. During the Peninsular War (1811–1812), invading French soldiers severely damaged both the monastery and chapel, though the architect Francisco de Paula del Villar y Lozano restored the chapel, whose walls were still standing, between 1857–1859. In 1994, a forest fire destroyed the roofs of all of the chapel's dependencies and cloister, provoking a partial collapse that destroyed much of the interior flooring and furniture. The situation was worsened the following autumn, when heavy rains caused a mudslide and further damaged the chapel and access trail. While repairs were undertaken that winter, a heavy downpour in the autumn of 1995 caused the lantern to collapse into the dome, both of which fell into the chapel. A full restoration was finally finished in march of 1997, when the chapel was reopened to pilgrims.

== Bibliography ==
- AA.VV.: Art de Catalunya, Edicions L'isard, Barcelona, 1998, ISBN 84-921314-5-4.
- AA.VV.: Història de l'art català, Edicions 62, Barcelona, 2005, ISBN 84-297-1997-0.
- Joan Bassegoda Nonell: Los jardines de Gaudí, Edicions UPC, Barcelona, 2001, ISBN 8483015382
