= Lange's conjecture =

Mathematical theorem

In algebraic geometry, Lange's conjecture is a theorem about stability of vector bundles over curves, introduced by Herbet Lange and proved by Montserrat Teixidor i Bigas and Barbara Russo in 1999.

== Statement ==
Let C be a smooth projective curve of genus greater or equal to 2. For generic vector bundles $E_1$ and $E_2$ on C of ranks and degrees $(r_1, d_1)$ and $(r_2, d_2)$, respectively, a generic extension

$$0 \to E_1 \to E \to E_2 \to 0$$

has E stable provided that $\mu(E_1) < \mu(E_2)$, where $\mu(E_i) = d_i/r_i$ is the slope of the respective bundle. The notion of a generic vector bundle here is a generic point in the moduli space of semistable vector bundles on C, and a generic extension is one that corresponds to a generic point in the vector space $\operatorname{Ext}^1$$(E_2,E_1)$.

An original formulation by Lange is that for a pair of integers $(r_1, d_1)$ and $(r_2, d_2)$ such that $d_1/ r_1 < d_2/r_2$, there exists a short exact sequence as above with E stable. This formulation is equivalent because the existence of a short exact sequence like that is an open condition on E in the moduli space of semistable vector bundles on C.
