= Torres de Segre =

- Municipality
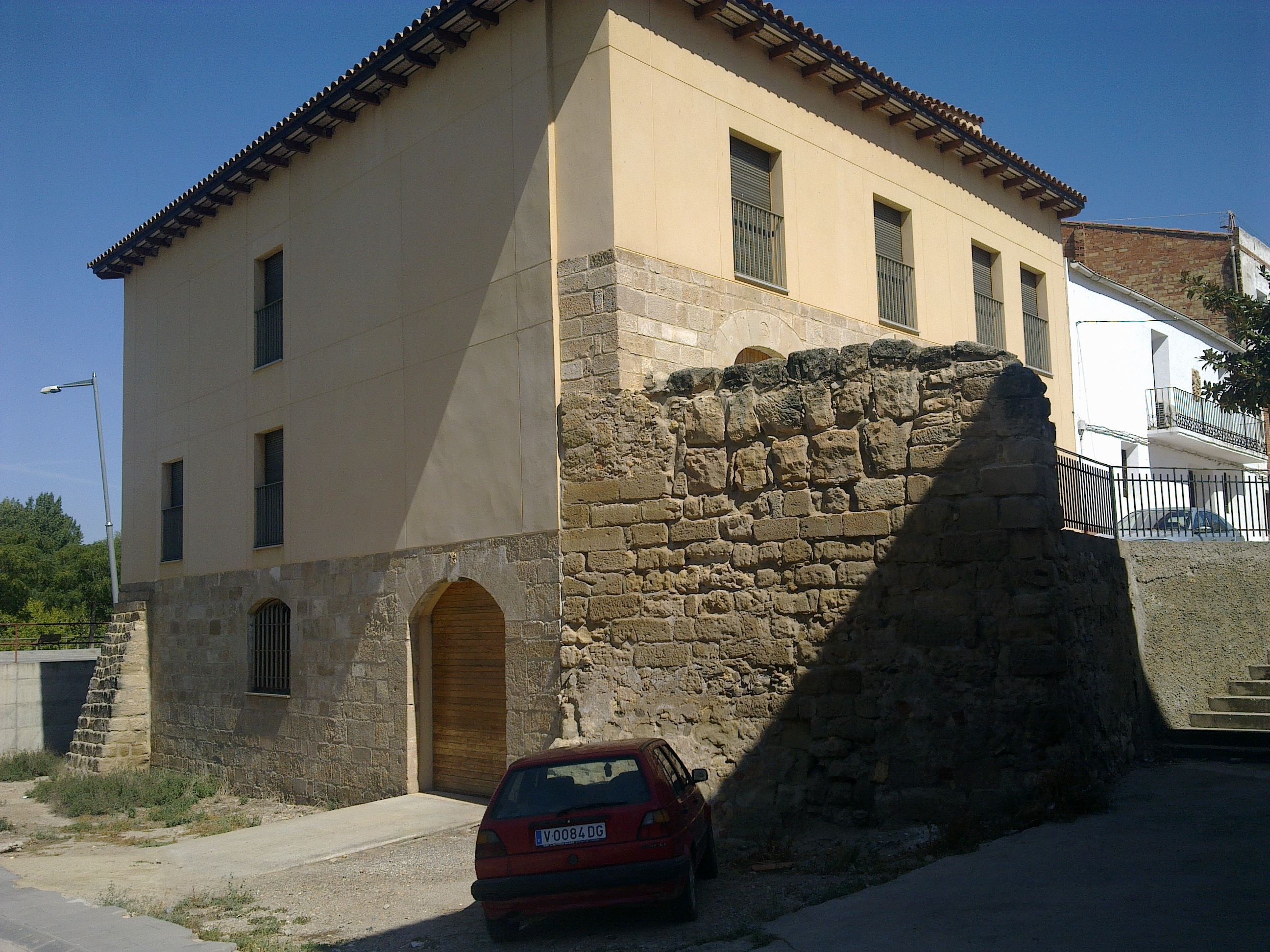
- Torres de Segre castle

- Coat of arms

- Location in Catalonia
- Coordinates: 41°32′N 0°31′E
- Province: Lleida
- Comarca: Segrià

Government
  - Mayor: José Ramón Branzuela Almacellas (2015)

Area
  - Total: 50.6 km^{2} (19.5 sq mi)
- Elevation: 119 m (390 ft)

Population (2025-01-01)
  - Total: 2,317
  - Density: 45.8/km^{2} (119/sq mi)
- Website: torressegre.cat

Torres de Segre (Catalan pronunciation: [ˈtorez ðe ˈseɣɾe]) is a village in the province of Lleida and autonomous community of Catalonia, Spain. It is located by the Segre River.

It has a population of 2,317 (register office, 2025).

== Notable people ==
- Montserrat Soliva Torrentó (1943–2019), Catalan professor
