= Cassià Maria Just =

Spanish cleric and abbot (1926–2008)

Cassià Maria Just i Riba (Catalan pronunciation: [kəsiˈa məˈɾi.ə ˈʒust]; 22 August 1926 – 12 March 2008) was a Spanish Catalan cleric, abbot of Santa Maria de Montserrat from 1966 to 1989.

== Biography ==
=== Early life ===
He was born on 22 August 1926 in Barcelona. At the age of nine, he joined the Escolania de Montserrat to study music. He became a member of the Order of Saint Benedict as a novice of Santa Maria de Montserrat on 6 August 1943. On 27 August 1950 he was ordained a priest. His music studies, focused on the organ, continued in Rome and Paris until 1956. His studies allowed him to compose several polyphonic pieces. From 1957 to 1964 he was the master of novices of Montserrat.

=== Abbot of Montserrat ===
In 1964 he was elected prior of Montserrat abbey. He became abbot in 1966, to replace Aureli Maria Escarré, who had had to go on exile during Francisco Franco's dictatorship because of some public statements against the regime. He continued the path his predecessor had begun. Just gave Montserrat his open-minded and peaceful style, which made him take in believers and non-believers and people from all ideologies in the abbey. During this time, Cassià kept solid ties with Pope Paul VI. His management of the abbey is notable because it took place during an era of changes in Spain and in Catholicism, it was a few years after the Second Vatican Council and the last years of Franco's dictatorship and the Spanish transition to democracy.

=== Later life ===
After ending his job as abbot he was involved in several humanitarian causes. In 1989 he formed a foundation against unemployment and to help disabled people. In 1994, he created a foundation with his name to help people with risk of being excluded from society to find a job.

In 1991 he was given the Cross of St. George award by the Generalitat de Catalunya.

=== Death ===
Late in December 2007, he suffered a stroke which required him to be admitted to hospital Sant Joan de Déu de Manresa. On 9 March he suffered another stroke, recovering from which would have been almost impossible. Cassià died on 12 March 2008 in the infirmary of the monastery.

==== Reactions to death and funeral ====
More than 1,500 persons attended Cassià's funeral. Amongst them were the last three presidents of the Generalitat, Jordi Pujol, Pasqual Maragall and José Montilla; Marius Rubiralta, the vice-chancellor of the University of Barcelona; the former archbishop of Girona, Jaume Camprodon and Josep Caminal, the former director of the Gran Teatre del Liceu.

== Political and religious views ==
The abbot was always a defender of human rights. and showed support for left-wing politics as well as Catalan nationalism. He opposed the Francoist regime. This made him be known as the "abad rojo" (red abbot).

He was a strong critic of some official positions of the Church. For him most part of the leaders of the Church were locked in ideas from the past which had to change. He believed the sexual morals of the Roman Catholic Church were outdated, and showed a favourable position towards the use of contraceptives. Cassià Maria also asked the Church to review its positions on homosexuality, euthanasia, and abortion.

== See also ==
- Roman Catholicism in Spain
