= Joan Cererols =

17th-century Spanish composer

- Born: Joan Cererols Martorell; 9 September 1618; Martorell, Spain
- Died: 27 August 1680 (aged 61); Santa Maria de Montserrat Abbey, Spain

Joan Cererols (9 September 1618 – 27 August 1680) was a Spanish composer and Benedictine monk. His musical production includes a Requiem (or Missa pro defunctis) composed in the mid-seventeenth century during the great plague which ravaged Barcelona, and a Missa de Batalla (Battle Mass) which celebrates the conquest of the Kingdom of Naples.

Cererols was born in Martorell, Catalonia. He entered the choir school Escolania de Montserrat around 1626. Cererols took his first steps in music under the direction of Father Joan Marc, a famous organist. After ten years in the escolania, Joan was admitted as a novice at the Monastery of Montserrat on 6 September 1636, at age eighteen. The polychoral dialogue texture with a slight gap between the vocal entries within each choir which lightens his style and contrasts with that of the composers of the earliest generation is supposed to be an influence of Marc.

In 1648, Cererols received the permission of Marc to visit Madrid where he could meet the new generation of musicians. After his return, he was confirmed as a member of the monastic community. After the death of Marc in 1658, Joan Cererols became choirmaster in his home monastery, a position he held until his death there in 1680. He was 61 years old.

== Recordings ==
- Joan Cererols: Missa pro Defunctis / Missa de Batalla

La Capella Reial de Catalunya – Jordi Savall, dir. Astrée (Auvidis) E 8704 [CD] – Astrée (Naïve) "Musica Iberica" ES 9924 CD

- Joan Cererols: Missa pro Defunctis / Vespers

Currende – Guillemette Laurens – Erik van Nevel, dir. Accent (Note 1) ACC 94106 CD
