= Montserrat Calleja Gómez =

Spanish Physicist

- Born: 20 April 1973 (age 53); Ourense, Galicia, Spain
- Education: University of Santiago de Compostela
- Known for: Physics
- Awards: Miguel Catalán (2012)
- Scientific career
- Fields: Physics, Bionanomechanics
- Workplaces: Institute of Micro and Nanotechnology
- Doctoral advisor: Ricardo García

Montserrat Calleja Gómez (born 20 April 1973) is a Spanish physicist who specializes in Bionanomechanics. She is currently a research professor at the Institute of Micro and Nanotechnology in Madrid, Spain.

== Early life and career ==
Montserrat was born in the Spanish Province of Ourense, Galicia, Spain. She obtained her degree in physics from University of Santiago de Compostela in 1998. She finished her Master's Degree in 2000 with the thesis "Optimizing the AFM dynamic mode for nanolithograph". She obtained her doctoral degree from the same University in 2002, after working under the supervision of Ricardo García at the Micro and Nanoelectronics Institute of Madrid specializing in nanotechnology and biosensors. Her PhD thesis was on the “Local oxidation of silicon surfaces by Atomic Force Microscopy and nanolithography applications”. She held a postdoctoral position as a Marie Curie fellow in the Technical University of Denmark – MIC where she worked on the nanofabrication of cantilever-based sensors under the supervision of Annia Boysen. She led the NANOFORCELLS project, whose goal was to study the mechanical properties of cells and its relationship with cancer. From 2008 to 2012, she was the head of the Devices, Sensors and Biosensors department at the Institute of Micro and Nanotechnology. One of her patented inventions is a nano-mechanical mass spectrometer to weight individual proteins of cells. She was the co-founder of Mecwins SA and Nanodreams SL.

== Notable publications ==
- Tamayo, J.; Kosaka, PM; Ruz, JJ; San Paulo, Á; Calleja, M (2013). "Biosensors based on nanomechanical systems". Chemical Society Reviews. 43 (3): 1287–1311. doi:10.1039/c2cs35293a. hdl:10261/88330. PMID 23152052.
- García, Ricardo; Calleja, Montserrat; Rohrer, Heinrich (1999). "Patterning of silicon surfaces with noncontact atomic force microscopy: Field-induced formation of nanometer-size water bridges". Journal of Applied Physics. 86 (4): 1898–1903. Bibcode:1999JAP....86.1898G. doi:10.1063/1.370985. hdl:10261/22353.
- García, Ricardo; Calleja, Montserrat; Perez-Murano, Francesc (1998). "Local oxidation of silicon surfaces by dynamic force microscopy: Nanofabrication and water bridge formation". Applied Physics Letters. 72 (18): 2295–2297. Bibcode:1998ApPhL..72.2295G. doi:10.1063/1.121340. hdl:10261/21052.
- Gil-Santos, Eduardo; Ramos, Daniel; Martínez, Javier; Fernández-Regúlez, Marta; García, Ricardo; San Paulo, Álvarez; Calleja, Montserrat; Tamayo, Javier (2010). "Nanomechanical mass sensing and stiffness spectrometry based on two-dimensional vibrations of resonant nanowires". Nature Nanotechnology. 5 (9): 641–5. Bibcode:2010NatNa...5..641G. doi:10.1038/nnano.2010.151. hdl:10261/27442. PMID 20693990.
- Mertens, Johann; Rogero, Celia; Calleja, Montserrat; Ramos, Daniel; Martín-Gago, José Ángel; Briones, Carlos; Tamayo, Javier (2008). "Label-free detection of DNA hybridization based on hydration-induced tension in nucleic acid films". Nature Nanotechnology. 3 (5): 301–7. doi:10.1038/nnano.2008.91. hdl:10261/25497. PMID 18654528.

== Awards ==
- Miguel Catalán Award for researchers under 40 years old (2012).
