= Montserrat Soliva Torrentó =

Catalan doctor of chemistry (1943–2019)

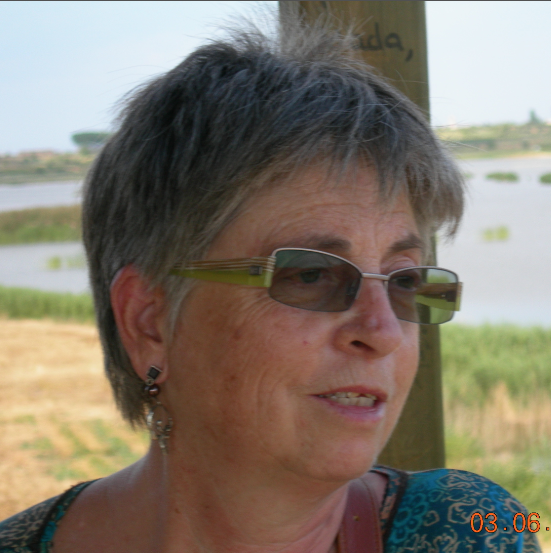
Montserrat Soliva Torrentó

Montserrat Soliva Torrentó (1 January 1943 - 15 September 2019) was a Catalan doctor of chemistry. She served as a professor of the Higher School of Agriculture of Barcelona of the Polytechnic University of Catalonia, and had been a leading authority in Spain on the subject of composting. In 2012, she was the recipient of the Environment Award for the research career.

== Biography ==
Montserrat Soliva Torrento was born in Torres de Segre, Lleida, 1943. She received a degree in Chemical Sciences from the University of Barcelona, and a PhD from the Institute of Fundamental Biology from the Autonomous University of Barcelona.

She worked for six years at the Laboratorio Químico-Textil de fibras artificiales de la SAFA in Blanes, and was a professor for 32 years at the School of Agriculture of Barcelona where she was responsible for subjects related to Agricultural Chemical Analysis and Management and treatment of organic waste. She specialized in the characterization, diagnosis and application of organic waste to the soil. After she retired, she continued to collaborate with the Organic Waste Characterization, Diagnosis and Composting group, of the Barcelona School of Agriculture (ESAB-UPC).

Soliva's research primarily focused on composting, with the mission of preserving and improving the environment, protecting the soil and increasing agricultural productivity. She directed more than 150 Ph.D. projects related to these topics, participated in numerous research projects, and advised companies and administrations on issues related to waste treatment. In addition, she published numerous scientific publications.

Soliva died in Blanes on 15 September 2019. She was the daughter of Napoleó Soliva Moner, a teacher of Blanes, where she worked for 30 years and in which she has a school dedicated to her name (Napoleó Soliva School) in recognition of her teaching career.

== Awards ==
- 2012, Environment Award, Generalitat of Catalonia
