= Montserrat Gil Torné =

Andorran politician

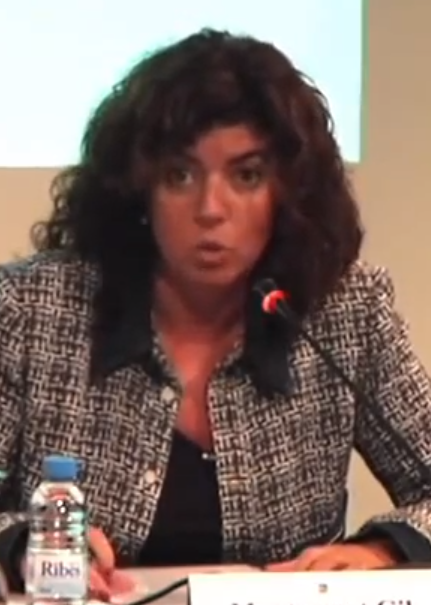
Montserrat Gil Torne

Montserrat Gil Torne (born 9 December 1966) is an Andorran politician in the Liberal Party of Andorra (PLA). Until the 2009 general election she served as Minister for Health, Social Welfare and Family, and is a member of the National Executive Committee of the PLA.
