= Santuario de la Cueva Santa =

Coordinates: 39.8425°N 0.6139°W

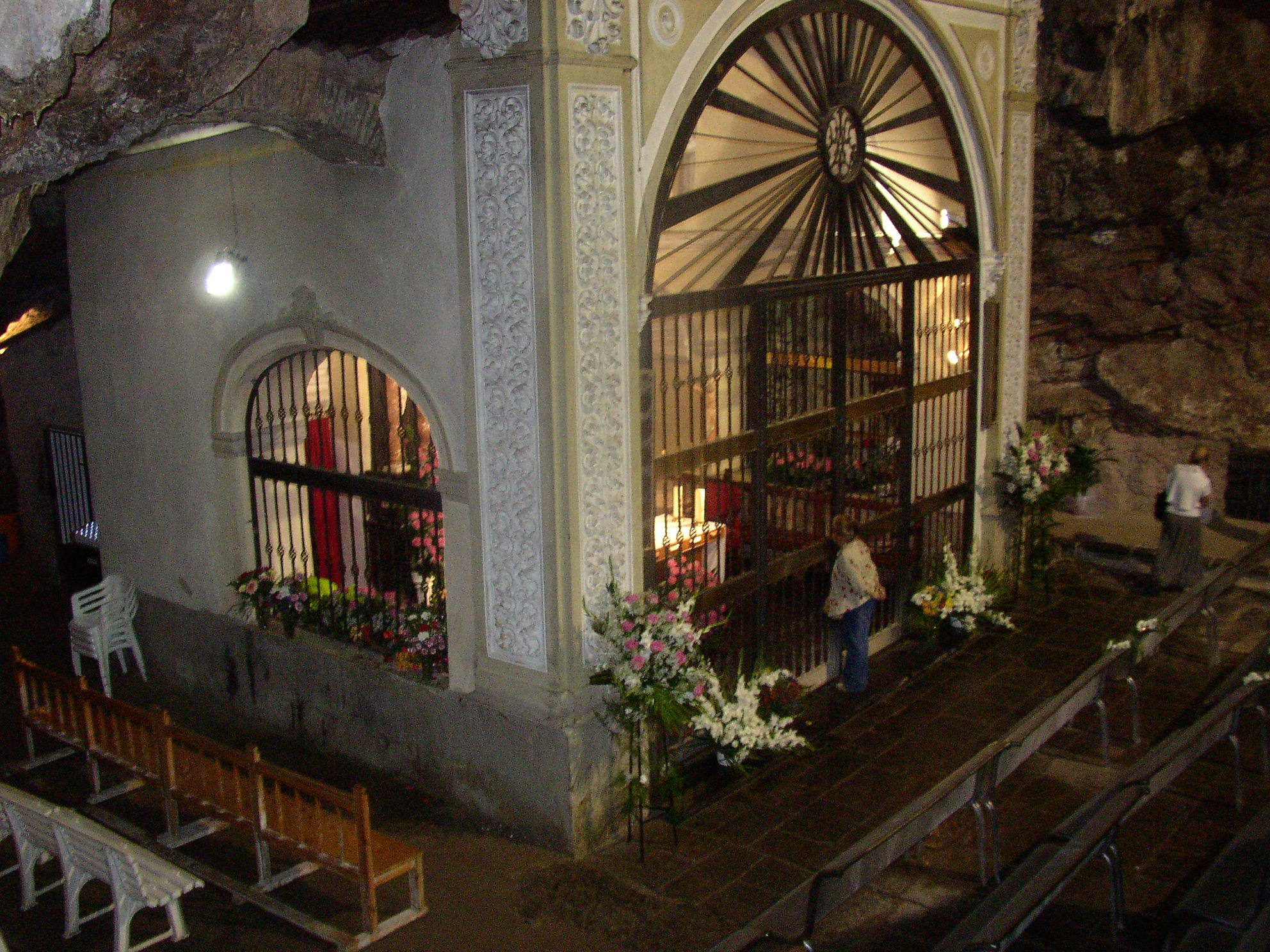
Santuario de la Cueva Santa

The Santuario de la Cueva Santa, also called la cueva del Latonero, is a Roman Catholic cave-chapel in Altura, Spain. It was made into a chapel by shepherds.
