= Montserrat Teixidor i Bigas =

Spanish mathematician

- Born: February 25, 1958 (age 68); Barcelona, Spain

Academic background
- Education: University of Barcelona (BSc, PhD)
- Thesis: Geometry of linear systems on algebraic curves
- Doctoral advisor: Gerard Eryk Welters

Academic work
- Discipline: Mathematics
- Sub-discipline: Linear systems Algebraic curves Pure mathematics
- Institutions: University of Liverpool; Radcliffe College; Tufts University

Montserrat Teixidor i Bigas (born February 25, 1958) is a Spanish-American academic who is a professor of mathematics at Tufts University in Medford, Massachusetts. She specializes in algebraic geometry, especially Moduli of Vector Bundles on curves.

== Education ==
Teixidor i Bigas was born in Barcelona in 1958. She earned a bachelor's degree and PhD from the University of Barcelona, where she wrote her dissertation, "Geometry of linear systems on algebraic curves", under the supervision of Gerard Eryk Welters.

== Career ==
She worked in the department of pure mathematics at the University of Liverpool, where she wrote "The divisor of curves with a vanishing theta-null", for Compositio Mathematica in 1988.

In 1997, she proved Lange's conjecture for the generic curve, with Barbara Russo, which states that "If $0<s\le n'(n-n')(g-1)$, then there exist stable vector bundles with $s_{n'}(E)=s$." They also clarified what happens in the interval $n'(n-n')(g-1)<s\le n'(n-n')g$ using a degeneration argument to a reducible curve.

She took up an appointment as an Associate Professor of Mathematics at Tufts University, and has been on the faculty of Tufts since 1989. She has been a reviewer for several journals, including the Bulletin of the American Mathematical Society, the Duke Mathematical Journal, and the journal of algebraic geometry. She has held visiting positions at Brown University and the University of Cambridge. She was also a co-organizer of the Clay Institute's workgroup on Vector Bundles on Curves.

In 2004, she spent a year at Radcliffe College as a Vera M. Schuyler Fellow, devoting her time to study of "the interplay between the geometry of curves and the equations defining them."

== Selected publications ==
- Montserrat Teixidor i Bigas, "Brill-Noether theory for vector bundles," Duke Math. J. Volume 62, Number 2 (1991), 385-400.
- Montserrat Teixidor i Bigas Curves in Grassmannians, Proc. Amer. Math. Soc. 126 (1998), no. 6, 1597–1603
- Montserrat Teixidor i Bigas "Green's conjecture for the generic $r$-gonal curve of genus $g\ge 3r-7$," Duke Math. J. 111 (2002), no. 2, 195–222.
- Montserrat Teixidor i Bigas Existence of coherent systems, Internat. J. Math. 19 (2008), no. 4, 449–454.
- Ivona Grzegorczyk, Montserrat Teixidor i Bigas, Brill-Noether theory for stable vector bundles, Moduli spaces and vector bundles, 29–50, London Math. Soc. Lecture Note Ser., 359, CUP, Cambridge (2009)
- Montserrat Teixidor i Bigas, Vector bundles on reducible curves and applications, Clay Mathematics Proceedings (2011)
- Tawanda Gwena, Montserrat Teixidor i Bigas, Maps between moduli spaces of vector bundles and the base locus of the theta divisor
- Brian Osserman, Montserrat Teixidor i Bigas Linked alternating forms and linked symplectic Grassmannians, Int. Math. Res. Not. IMRN 2014, no. 3, 720–744.
