= Ricardo Montserrat =

French writer and author (1954–2020)

- Born: 12 April 1954; Saint-Brieuc, France
- Died: 18 October 2020 (aged 66); Concepción, Chile
- Occupations: Author; Writer

Ricardo Montserrat (12 April 1954 – 18 October 2020) was a French author, novelist, essayist, and translator.

== Biography ==
Born in 1954 in Brittany to Catalan antifascist parents exiled and opposed by the regime of Francisco Franco, Montserrat found solace in the theatre in his childhood. In Chile, during the reign of Augusto Pinochet, he took action against the dictatorship's misdeeds and produced approximately forty works on the topic. Upon his return to France in 1992, he continued to write and service himself to those oppressed by authoritarian dictators.

Since 2006, Montserrat wrote about the Popular Front, extreme violence, and utopian happiness. In 2010, he launched a series of works on the dark history of Nord-Pas-de-Calais, published by Éditions Baleine and covered by La Voix du Nord, L'Avenir de l'Artois, Nord éclair, and France Télévisions. He was associated with the Société des Auteurs et Compositeurs Dramatiques, the Société des gens de lettres, and others.

Ricardo Montserrat died in Concepción, Chile on 18 October 2020 at the age of 66.

== Publications ==
=== Novels ===
- Les Périlleuses Mémoires de Tito Perrochet (1992)
- Là-bas, la haine (1993)
- Aziliz, ou les Filleuls de l'Ankou (1996)
- No Name (1999)
- En E Enkou, Entre la Mort (2009)

=== News and Tales ===
- Rêves de travail (1995)
- Pâté de gangster (1997)
- Le Livre des livres
- Les Deux Anges et le Titanic (1998)
- Judas (1999)
- Mort de faim (2000)
- Katu (2002)
- Dix petites noires (2000)
- Le Rouge dans le noir (Ultima - Hasta - L'Heure O) (2001)
- Ode à la boîte de thon Hénaff (2003)
- Taol Lagad (2003)
- ABC des colères du présent (2005)
- Mort de femme
- Les Pommes d'or (2005)
- Le Vendredi noir (2007)
- Ma vie est un photoroman (2008)
- B’ffroi (2008)
- Nordpasdepapiers, Deux fleurs bleues (2009)
- Decimas (2015)
- Nutopie (2016)
- Nosotros (2016)

=== Poetry ===
- Espace vécu (1998)
- Ville rouge (2002)

=== Essays ===
- Luis Guiu (1996)
- Chemins vicinaux et voies de traverse (1999)
- À corps écrits (1999)
- Le Silence et la Peur (2000)
- Maladie de la jeunesse (2001)
- L’Homme-livre (2002)
- Être et savoir (2003)
- Demain en France (2006)
- Les Paris de l’écriture collective (2008)
- Au commencement... (2014)

== Filmography ==
- Sauve-moi (2000)
- Va, petite ! (2002)
- Sempre vivu ! (2007)
- Una guerra sin fin (2007)
- Une histoire de jeunes sans histoire (2012)
