= Virgin of Montserrat =

Marian advocation venerated in the monastery of Montserrat

The Virgin of Montserrat La Moreneta
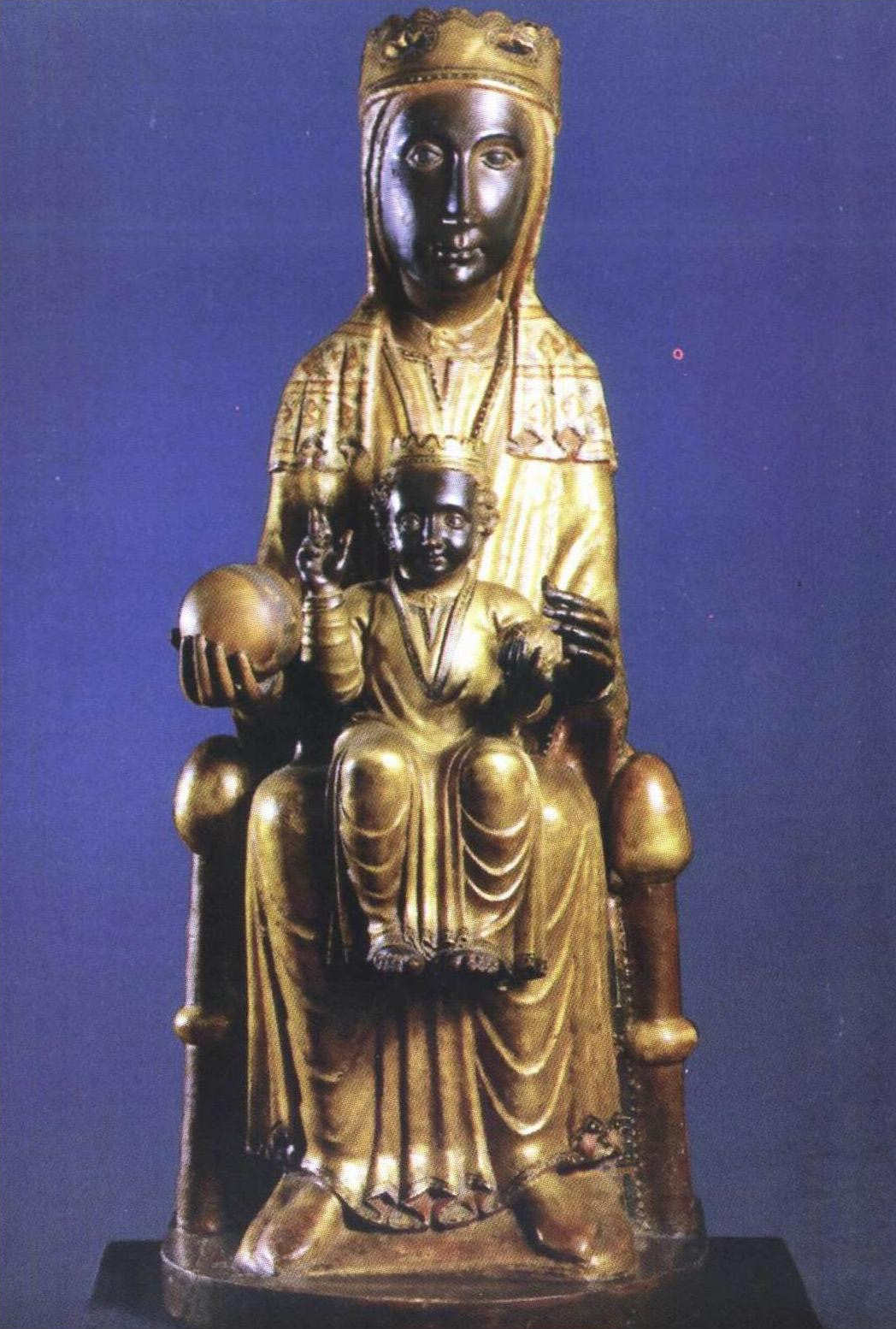
- Our Lady of Mount Serrat

Our Lady of Montserrat Patroness of Catalonia
- Venerated in: Roman Catholic Church
- Major shrine: Santa Maria de Montserrat Abbey, Catalonia, Spain
- Attributes: Polychrome statue of Mary with the Child Jesus depicted as the Throne of Wisdom holding an orb in her right hand
- Patronage: Catalonia

Our Lady of Montserrat or the Virgin of Montserrat (Catalan: Mare de Déu de Montserrat) is a Roman Catholic image of the Blessed Virgin Mary associated with an enthroned statue of the Madonna and Child enshrined at the monastery of Santa Maria de Montserrat in Catalonia, Spain. She is the patroness saint of Catalonia, an honour she shares with Saint George (Sant Jordi in Catalan). Miracles have been attributed to the statue.

Pope Leo XIII granted the image a decree of canonical coronation in 11 September 1881. The image is one of the Black Madonnas of Europe, hence its native Catalan name, La Moreneta (English: the petite dark one). The Romanesque sculpture is crafted in wood from the late 12th century.

An 18th-century similar statue is also displayed in Saint Peter's Basilica which was gifted by the former President of Brazil, João Goulart on the papal election of Pope Paul VI in 1963. The image has been on display for Papal Masses since the pontificate of Pope Benedict XVI.

== History ==
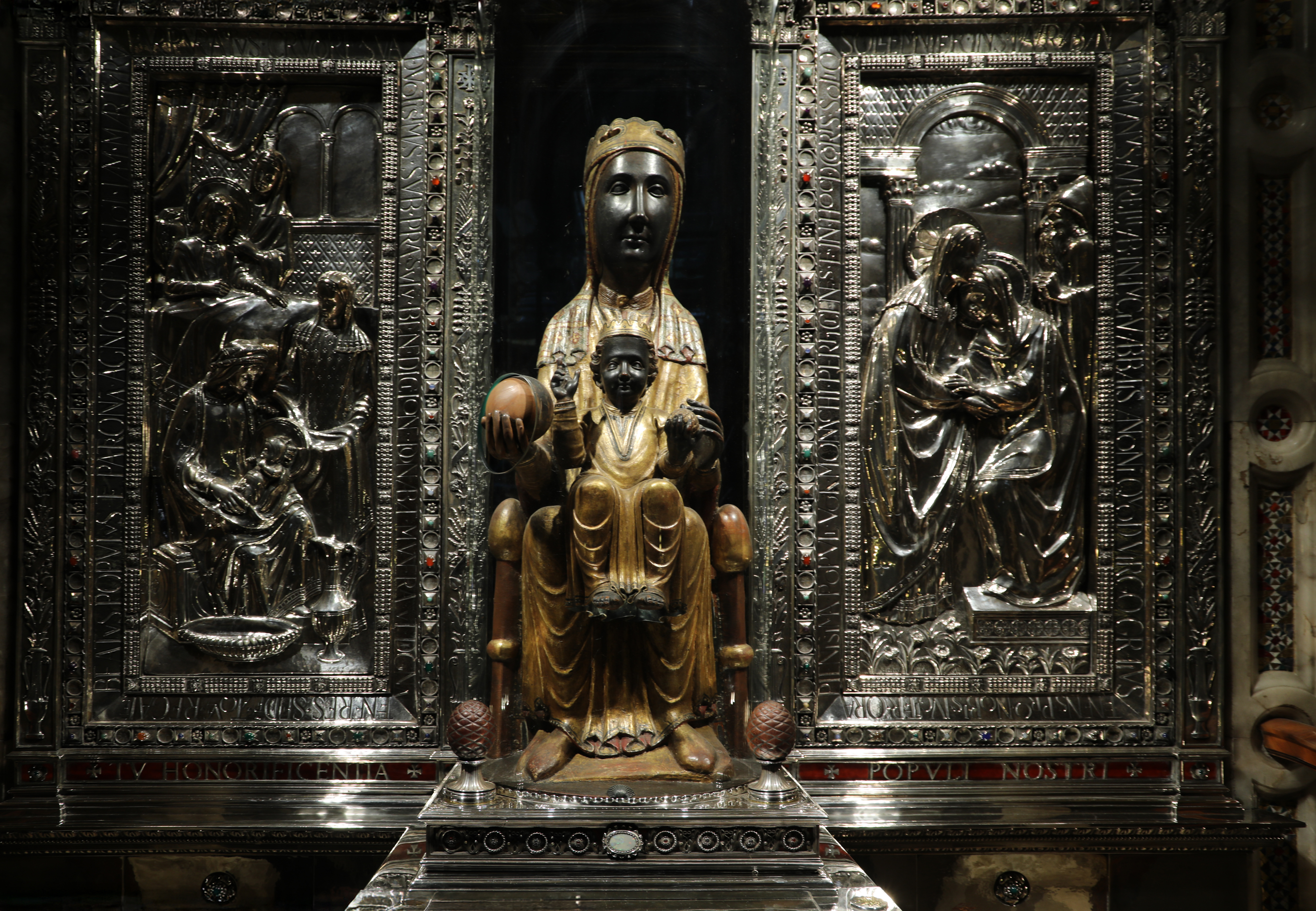
"La Moreneta"

The mountain of Montserrat has been of religious significance since pre-Christian times, when the Romans built a temple to honor the Roman goddess Venus.

By one account, the image of the Madonna was moved to Montserrat in 718, to avoid the danger posed by invading Saracens.

Legend has it that the Benedictine monks could not move the statue to construct their monastery, choosing to instead build around it. The statue's sanctuary is located at the rear of the chapel, where an altar of gold surrounds the icon, and is now a site of pilgrimage.

== Description ==
The 95-cm (38-inch) wooden statue shows evidence of Byzantine conventional and stylized form, and is painted in polychrome. The reliquary statue of Sainte-Foy in Conques (southern France) may have been a model. The art-historical designation for this type of pose is called "Throne of Wisdom". The body is thin, the face elongated. She holds an orb of the earth in her right hand. The Child's hand is raised in a formalized and traditional Eastern blessing.

In 2001, renovators working for the government observed that the black hands and face of La Moreneta had over the centuries undergone a change in colour. They attribute the change—from a lighter tone to black—either to prolonged exposure to candle smoke or a chemical reaction caused by a varnish used as a paint sealant. The statue was repainted black by successive generations of restorers. A series of tests, including X-rays, revealed the statue's original colour and also showed that the last repainting took place at the turn of the 19th century.

== Veneration ==
After making a pilgrimage to Our Lady of Montserrat around 1203, Peter Nolasco went to Barcelona where he began to practise various works of charity. Nolasco became concerned with the plight of Christians captured in Moorish raids and decided to establish the Merecedarians, a religious order to succor these unfortunates.

Upon his recovery from battle wounds, Ignatius of Loyola visited the Benedictine monastery of Montserrat (on 25 March 1522), where he laid down his military accoutrements before the image. He then led a period of asceticism before later founding the Society of Jesus.

The hymn to the Virgin of Montserrat, known as "el Virolai" and sung at noon each day by the Escolania de Montserrat boys' choir, begins with the words: "Rosa d’abril, Morena de la serra..." (Rose of April, dark-skinned lady of the mountain...). Therefore, this virgin is sometimes also known as the "Rosa d'abril". Her feast is kept on April 27.

== Patronage ==
The statue has always been considered one of the most celebrated images in Spain. "La Moreneta" is one of Catalonia's two patron saints, together with Sant Jordi (Saint George).

== Given name ==
The name Montserrat, traditionally abbreviated to Serrat, Rat, Rateta, Tat or Tóna, and also to Montse in recent years, is a popular girl's name in Catalonia.
