= Montserrat Gudiol =

Catalonian painter

- Born: Montserrat Gudiol i Corominas; 9 June 1933; Barcelona, Spain
- Died: 25 December 2015 (aged 82); Barcelona, Spain
- Other name: Montserrat Gudiol Corominas
- Father: José Gudiol Ricart

Montserrat Gudiol i Corominas (9 June 1933 – 25 December 2015) was a Catalonian painter.

== Biography ==
Gudiol was born in Barcelona as the daughter of the art historian José Gudiol Ricart, who authored many books and ran a medieval painting restoration studio. She trained in his studio and began painting on her own in 1950.

In 1980 she made a monumental Saint Benedict for the Abbey of Montserrat and in 1981 she was the first woman to enter the Royal Academy of Fine Arts of Sant Jordi (Reial Acadèmia Catalana de Belles Arts de Sant Jordi). Gudiol died in Barcelona.

== Works ==
She is known for her portrayals of (mostly female) figures portrayed in space with ambiguous backgrounds. Some of her work seems to recall Hieronymus Bosch with a wink at her father's studio, and others seem to reflect the works of famous painters of her day such as Picasso.
