= Marti Montserrat Guillemat =

Catalan musician

Martí Montserrat Guillemat (sometimes erroneously cited as Guillamet, b: El Morell, Tarragona, July 4, 1906 – d: Barcelona, January 12, 1990), also known as Serramont, was a Catalan musician.

Composer, conductor, pianist, accordionist and organist. The Serramont Orchestra was founded in 1932, with slight variations from Musette Serramont Orchestra or Serramont and José de Morato Orchestra, was active more than three decades. He performed throughout Spain and in several countries: Portugal, Morocco, Algeria, Belgium, Switzerland and France. He accompanied popular singers of the era as Mario Visconti. Throughout his career, he performed in nightclubs as the Rigat and El Oro del Rin. His orchestra was the first to perform on Spanish TV at their Catalan studio in Miramar (Barcelona).

At a very young age he learned to play the piano by ear and at the age of 9 he used to play at his father's café in El Morell. Years later, he also in other surrounding villages until the family moved to Barcelona and Martin studied in the Conservatori Superior de Música del Liceu.

His repertoire dominated the dance music. His first composition, the schottish Ni Pintao dates from 1925. In 1927 he worked as a pianist at the Principal Palace, where he met Carlos Gardel, who showed interest in the tango by Serramont La gloria del águila, which was recorded in 1928. It is also remarkable the paso-doble Mi emoción al ver a Arruza (a famous bullfighter) which was recorded by the baritone Marcos Redondo around 1944. Serramont also composed songs like Avelina, performed by the tenor Emili Vendrell in 1932 and the sardana El noi de l'acordió in 1949. He took a role in films as a composer, and even as a performer: Un enredo de família (1943) is one example. He marriaged Maria Balart, from who he had two daughters, Maria Antonia and Montserrat.
