= Escolania de Montserrat =

Choir and music school

The Escolania de Montserrat, or simply the Escolania (Catalan pronunciation: [əskuləni.ə]) is a boys' choir of sopranos and altos based at the Benedictine abbey Santa Maria de Montserrat near Barcelona, Catalonia, Spain. When the repertory requires it, they are accompanied by the Montserrat Chapel Choir, composed of old choirboys and the monks of the Ministry Chapel Choir. The Escolania of Montserrat, which belongs to the Monastery of Montserrat, is one of the oldest boys choirs in Europe. Records show that the Escolania has existed as a religious and musical institution since the 14th century. It is composed of more than fifty boys, from ages nine to fourteen, originating from various towns in Catalonia, the Balearic Islands, and the Valencian community. During their time at the Escolania, they complete courses at the Primary, and beginning of Secondary levels, as well as corresponding musical studies. Each student must study two instruments; the piano, as well as a second orchestral instrument of their choice. Along with this, they study Musical Language, Orchestra, and participate in the choir (the distinguished focus of the school).

== Musical Activities of the Choir ==
The school choir sings daily in the Basilica, often in front of large groups of pilgrims and visitors from around the world. The midday singing of Salve Regina has become the most attended act of the Sanctuary. They have released numerous albums, and have toured in various countries such as: Hungary, Switzerland, France, Italy, Ireland, Belgium, Germany, Poland, Russia, where they have performed three times (Moscow 2011 & 2013, and St. Petersburg 2011), United States (2014) and China (2015). In March 2023 they performed 3 concerts in Australia as part of the Adelaide Festival.

== History ==
- 1025: The Benedictine Community of Montserrat was founded.
- 12th Century: Period of the Virgin of Montserrat. Pilgrims started to climb the mountain to venerate the Virgin.
- 1307: First documentation showing the existence of the Escolania, which is also the first reference to the choir robes worn today.
- 1479: The choir sang for the Catholic King Fernando during his visit to Barcelona.
- 1494: Abbot García de Cisneros spoke of the importance of religious music in relation to the choristers of the Escolania, which was made up of about 20 boys at the time.
- 16th Century: Bartomeu Garriga, a chorister at the time, promised that when he was older, he would make a great temple for the Virgin. In 1560, as Abbot of the Monastery, he started to construct the current Basilica.
- 17th-18th Century: Period of growth, with the first appearance of Masters of the Escolania. This title was given to monks that directed the choir and cultivated a new repertoire of compositions.
- 1889-1909: Fr. Manuel Guzmán introduced a new style to the sound of the choir, and continued on to teach future directors of the Escolania.
- 1909-1911: Fr. Ramir Escofet became director.
- 1911-1933: Fr. Anselm Ferrer, who studied in Italy, became the director and composer. He created the first recordings of the Escolania and evolved the tone of the choir.
- 1933-1936: Blessed Fr. Àngel Rodamilans was director as well as a martyr during the Civil War.
- 1936-1939: The monks and students needed to abandon Montserrat during the Spanish Civil War.
- 1939-1953: Fr. David Pujol was director.
- 1953-1997: Fr. Ireneu Segarra, director and composer. Under his leadership, the choir grew to fifty students, and released numerous records. They also began to perform concerts outside of Montserrat for the first time in the 1960s, including international tours.
- 1997-2000: Fr. Jordi-Agustí Piqué was the director.
- 2000-2007: Joaquim Piqué was the first lay director.
- 2007–2014: Bernat Vivancos was the director.
- 2014-Present: Llorenç Castelló is the current director.
