= Eternal feminine =

Transcendental idealisation of femininity

The eternal feminine (German: das Ewig-Weibliche), a concept first introduced by Johann Wolfgang von Goethe at the end of his play Faust (1832), is a transcendental ideality of the feminine or womanly abstracted from the attributes, traits and behaviors of a large number of women and female figures. In Faust, these include historical, fictional, and mythological women, goddesses, and even female personifications of abstract qualities such as wisdom. As an ideal, the eternal feminine has an ethical component, which means that not all women contribute to it. Those who, for example, spread malicious gossip about other women or even just conform slavishly to their society's conventions are by definition non-contributors. If there is no element, however slight, of transcendence, of moral beauty or worth, nothing that "draws us on high" (zieht uns hinan — the last line of Faust), there is no eternal feminine. Since the eternal feminine appears without explanation (though not without preparation) only in the last two lines of the 12,111-line play, it is left to the reader to work out which traits and behaviors it involves and which of the various women and female figures in the play contribute them. On these matters Goethe scholars have achieved a fair degree of consensus. The eternal feminine also has societal, cosmic and metaphysical dimensions.

Since Goethe's time the concept of the eternal feminine has been used by a number of philosophers, psychologists, psychoanalysts, theologians, feminists, poets and novelists. By some it has been employed or developed in ways congruent with Goethe's original conception, but by others in ways that depart from it considerably in one or more respects, not always felicitously. A complicating factor is that when the expression "eternal feminine" passed into popular usage, it tended (except among the knowledgeable) to lose any connection with Goethe's original idea and to be taken as referring to the prevailing cultural stereotypes of what constitutes the feminine.

== Goethe ==
The concept of the "eternal feminine" was introduced by Goethe in the "Chorus Mysticus" at the end of Faust, Part Two (1832):

Everything transient
Is but a symbol;
The insufficient
Here finds fulfilment;
The indescribable
Here becomes deed;
The eternal-feminine
Draws us on high.

Although Goethe does not introduce the eternal feminine until the last two lines of the play, he prepared for its appearance at the outset. "Equally pertinent in this regard", writes J. M. van der Laan, "are Gretchen and Helen, who alternate with each other from start to finish and ultimately combine with others to constitute the Eternal-Feminine" At the beginning of Part I, Act IV, Faust glimpses in the passing clouds "a godlike female form" in which he discerns Juno, Leda, Aurora, Helen and Gretchen. This "lovely form" does not dissolve, but rises into the aether, drawing, Faust says, "the best of my soul forth with itself"—rather as the eternal feminine does in the last line of the play. Also embodiments of the eternal feminine are four other women who appear with the redeemed Gretchen at the end of Part II, Act V: Magna Peccatrix (the "great sinner" who anointed Jesus), Mulier Samaritana (the Samaritan woman at the well), Maria Aegyptiaca (Mary of Egypt), and Mater Gloriosa (Mary, mother of Jesus). Then there are Galatea, who appears in Part II, Act II as a surrogate for Aphrodite; the Graces Aglaia (representing beauty), Hegemone (representing creativity), and Euphrosyne (representing joy), who feature briefly in Part II, Act I; and even the uncanny Mothers, whom Faust visits in Part II, Act I to conjure up Helen. Sophia, the biblical personification of divine wisdom, does not appear per se in Faust, but she is subtly present in Helen, not to mention the other women; her attributes (Wisdom 7:23–26) recall those of the female figures manifested in the clouds; and she is alluded to in Goethe's repeated references to eternal light (cf. Wisdom 7:26). Significantly, the women who contribute to the eternal feminine often appear in groups, and at times one of them calls up the image of another. In Helen there are hints of Gretchen (in the cloud scene) and Sophia; Galatea appears as an Aphrodite figure. The eternal feminine is a communal affair, a sisterhood.

However, not all the female figures who appear in the play contribute to the eternal feminine. As van der Laan notes, "Lieschen, who gossips about the misfortunes of Barbara, pregnant out of wedlock, does not possess the qualities later to be associated with the Eternal-Feminine. These qualities are also lacking in the witches of the Walpurgis Night. Only a select number of the play's many feminine figures contribute something of themselves to the construction of the ideality Goethe finally reveals at the end of the play."

The subversive side of Goethe's eternal feminine is highlighted by Nietzsche scholar Carol Diethe, who observes that Goethe, like Nietzsche in a different way later, used the concept to challenge the "blinkered bourgeois morality" of nineteenth-century Germany: "In Goethe's case, that morality ought to have put the child murderess Gretchen beyond the pale: at the end of Faust I (1808), she is not just a fallen woman but a felon, which is precisely why Goethe places her in the redemptive role, forcing his wealthy Weimar theater audience to show tolerance, willy-nilly."

A host of female figures—van der Laan mentions at least fifteen, not counting the Mothers—contribute something of themselves and their various symbolic possibilities to the eternal feminine. The range of connotations is extraordinarily diverse. While the eternal feminine symbolizes such qualities as beauty, truth, love, mercy, and grace, it "also personifies the transcendent realm of ultimate being, of divine wisdom and creative power which forever exceeds human reach, but at the same time ever draws us into itself." Goethe's "Eternal Feminine," writes the Korean-American philosopher T. K. Seung, "is the supreme cosmic power for the governance of the world." The "feminine principle", which "operates in every human heart", is "a cosmic principle." Seung sees a parallel to the Taoist descriptions of Yin and Yang, observing that in Chinese philosophy "Yin is the feminine principle; Yang is the masculine principle.... But Yin is the mother of all things. The primacy of Yin over Yang is expressed by the phrase 'Yin and Yang.' The Chinese never say 'Yang and Yin.' The ancient Chinese belief [is] that Yin is stronger than Yang." Citing the opinion of Goethe scholar Hans Arens that "the Eternal-Feminine is not simply to be equated with love. Rather, it is the eternal or divine which reveals itself in the feminine," van der Laan concludes: "As the symbolic representation of divine wisdom and creative power, the Eternal-Feminine can never be grasped or possessed. Beyond all human reach and comprehension, the eternal and divine always draws Faust and humanity onward toward itself."

The Goethean concept of the eternal feminine is an ideal for both men and women, to the same degree, if not in the same way. This is shown in the use of common-gendered terms like "us" (Goethe's uns), "humanity" or "people" to refer to those whom it draws upward and on. As Lawrence Kramer notes, "the 'Chorus Mysticus' of Goethe's Faust is deliberately left ungendered at the conclusion of a slowly evolving antiphony of male and female voices. Goethe's chorus removes sexual difference from the sphere of persons to the sphere of principles: the eternal feminine is precisely that which beckons, leads onward, an 'us' that is both male and female." In Goethe's mature thought (he finished writing Faust, Part Two shortly before his death at the age of eighty-two), encompassing the range of human experience requires transcending the traditional stuff of patriarchy, as it tends to efface the feminine. His introduction in his magnum opus of the eternal feminine is an attempt to redress this imbalance and achieve a more comprehensive vision. In T. K. Seung's words, "the noble forms of the Eternal Feminine"—symbolized in the play by the "godlike female form" in the clouds in which Faust discerns Juno, Leda, Aurora, Helen and Gretchen—"are Goethe's transcendent forms, which stand above all positive norms and which enable us to transcend the narrow perspective of our individual self. This power of transcendence is provided by the Eternal Feminine."

== Feminist Transcendentalism ==
=== Margaret Fuller ===
The right to pursue self-culture (Bildung) regardless of sex, race, or social position was at the heart of the project of nineteenth-century New England Transcendentalism. "Self-culture," declared Transcendentalist lecturer John Albee in 1885, "must be held up and measured on the Goethean plan." He was the husband of Harriet Ryan Albee, the founder of Channing Home.

"Goethe always represents the highest principle on the feminine form," wrote feminist Transcendentalist Margaret Fuller in her essay "Goethe" (1841) In Woman in the Nineteenth Century (1845), she wrote that Goethe, "educating the age to a clearer consciousness" of what humanity can be, "elevating the human being, in the most imperfect states of society, by continual efforts of self-culture," takes "as good care of women as of men." "He aims at a pure self-subsistence, and free development of any powers with which they may be gifted by nature as much for them as for men. They are units [individuals] addressed as souls. Accordingly, the meeting between man and woman, as represented by him, is equal and noble." His major female characters are "very individual, yet arouse an infinite expectation. ... Their different characters have free play, ... for nothing is enforced or conventional." They anticipate "an era of freedom" in which "New individualities shall be developed in the actual world."

As illustrations of Goethe's "highest principle on the feminine form", Fuller mentions Margaret (Gretchen) in Faust, Iphigenia in Iphigenia in Tauris (1787), Leonora in Torquato Tasso (1790) and (in "Goethe") Ottilie in Elective Affinities (1809). Most of her exemplars, however, are drawn from Wilhelm Meister's Apprenticeship (1795–1796) and its sequel, Wilhelm Meister's Journeyman Years (1821). She mentions eight female characters from these novels, but, like later Goethe scholars, she regards five as of primary significance. These are the artistic, androgynous Mignon ("the lyrical element in Woman"); the pragmatic, self-sufficient estate manager Theresa; the deeply religious Beautiful Soul (die schöne Seele); the contemplative Macaria ("a pure and perfected intelligence embodied in feminine form"); and the "beautiful Amazon" (die schöne Amazone) Natalie, who first appears on horseback to rescue Wilhelm when he is attacked and wounded by bandits. Fuller notes that "Mignon and Theresa wear male attire when they like, and it is graceful for them to do so." And Natalie, when Wilhelm first sees her, is wearing a man's overcoat. (It is a cold night.) Fuller, who could shoot rapids in an Indian canoe or ride twenty miles horseback without fatigue, had an appreciation for practical clothing.

For Fuller, "man and woman... are the two halves of one thought.... I believe that the development of the one cannot be effected without that of the other." Furthermore, "male and female... are perpetually passing into one another.... There is no wholly masculine man, no purely feminine woman." Fuller, who disliked expressions like "She has a masculine mind", expressed this idea in terms drawn from classical mythology: "Man partakes of the feminine in the Apollo, woman of the masculine in the Minerva." One of the most warlike of the classical goddesses, Minerva embodied a fierce independence. Fuller had no doubt that women were thoroughly capable of being sea-captains or military leaders and that there would one day be "a female Newton".

=== Ednah Dow Cheney ===
Fuller's tragically premature death means that for a considered reflection on the meaning of the eternal feminine from a feminist Transcendentalist perspective we must go to Ednah Dow Cheney, who in 1885 gave a lecture at the Concord School of Philosophy on "Das Ewig-Weibliche". (Cheney also discusses the eternal feminine in her 1897 address, "The Reign of Womanhood", and in her memoir, Reminiscences, published in 1902.) Goethe's lines on the eternal feminine, she noted, come at the very end of his last and greatest work: "We may almost say that they are the last important utterance of his mind, the climax of all his thought, all his experience. They are the final summing up in his thought of human life." She then asked why Goethe, rather than using some "more general term" such as "Divine Humanity", found "his true expression in 'Das Ewig-Weibliche'? Why does he use the word, which implies difference of sex, and the eternally directing function of one aspect of the eternal thought, instead of employing a phrase that would express the whole?" Her answer was that Goethe wished to express "the essential nature" of the power which he thus invoked: "It is not the feminine in its manifestation"—i.e. actual female-sexed bodies—"but in its original character" This "original character" is what she had called a little earlier "one aspect of the eternal thought". Ontologically, it is prior to women (or woman), but it "manifests" in them (rather than in men).

Cheney then attempts to define what this "aspect" is. She surveys Goethe's novels, poems, plays, autobiographical writings, even his scientific works on botany and colour theory, and concludes that it is relation. In Goethe's view, she writes, "It is for the truth of relation that we come into mortal existence,—not to know ourselves, not to save ourselves, not to be ourselves except in relation.... The relation of Man to Woman is typical of this great law.... Throughout the universe, only relation is creative.... When Man and Woman see each other, they begin to apprehend the Universe." Mere identity—the self prior to relation—is "not complete". It "can only be perfected by fitting itself to others, accepting the welfare of others as more its own than its own personality." She quotes Goethe scholar Herman Grimm: "Goethe was persuaded that all phenomena stand in mutual relation, and therefore nothing can be demonstrated by the study of isolated parts." She observes that "the idea of womanhood always suggests that of relation, symbolizing as she does the attractive forces of existence, beauty winning to union,...in one all-comprehensive word, love." Or, in more abstract terms, "The attractive principle is at once attraction which stimulates action and the centripetal power which holds action true to its centre." This puts woman "in the van of the world's progress of evolution". The "highest human relation" is love. "Woman's misery, man's degradation, is the result of the broken law of love." Women know this better than men because they test life "by a more delicate analysis than masculine logic supplies". They consider "things in their relations". That is why in "the great work in which Goethe sought to read the riddle of life,... das Weibliche is the moving power". The "one simple thought" that runs all through Faust is expressed "in the last grand verse", where is revealed "that which enters into every faith, which underlies the beautiful in art, the ideal in philosophy, the essence of morality, the meaning of life. It is the sense of the relation of the individual to the universal. We never think, never can think, of the feminine alone. It is not what separates her from others, but what gives the power of union, which makes her feminine, and so creative. And the masculine knows itself only in relation to the feminine. So it is that the eternally feminine 'draws us by sweet leadings' of beauty to love, to union, to new creation."

At this point, however, Cheney confronts a difficulty which she knows will have occurred to some of her listeners, one which she pondered to the end of her life. "But in using these words," she says, "we must remember that these human forms which we live among, and which flit past us like the changing phantoms in Goethe's half-mocking drama are but shadows and types." Sex, as it has evolved from its earliest beginnings "to its beautiful outcome in the highest human relation,... is a shadowing forth of a... duality", a "double strand"—the masculine and the feminine. But if this "double strand... represents duality, it equally represents unity and universality." We "may as well divide the rainbow by arbitrary lines" as seek to separate characteristics so "unstable and interchangeable", so "constantly blended in manifestation... and in the highest natures the most perfectly". Earlier in the lecture, she had spoken of how impossible it is to trace the distinction of sex in mental life: "In externals, in the realm of form, it is easy enough to make divisions, but in any finer sense it can only be felt, no analysis has ever been keen enough to detect it." Common stereotypes, such as that men are governed by judgment while women are swayed by feelings, are "a delusive cheat". Their wide acceptance had led the Transcendentalist writer Theodore Parker to argue that "in a semi-barbarous civilization, such as ours still is," men take any suggestion that sexual difference extends to the mind as "the pretext for a claim of sovereignty, and a power of oppression" over women.

Parker's claim that "There is no sex in souls," however, does not convince Cheney. "Masculine" and "feminine" may be but "shadows and types", but they can hardly be dispensed with. The best course, in her view, is to be pragmatic, to give them meanings that, rather than conveying harmful stereotypes, can actually be useful from a feminist and a societal perspective. The definitions she offers, while nonarbitrary—they are in line with her idea that the core meaning of the eternal feminine is relation—are extremely general as well as highly abstract (the terminology is largely drawn from physics), and are clearly to be taken metaphorically—that is, as pointers to something which by its very nature ("shadows and types") eludes precise definition. The masculine represents force, the feminine attraction. The masculine is centrifugal, the feminine is centripetal. The masculine stands for apartness ("Faust is the unrelated man"), the feminine for union. Typically, in a society in which the masculine dominates, man has "largely taken the material aggressive part of the life of the world, and... woman, in so far truly his worst enemy, has yielded to his exactions and fostered his pride of authority and self-love." Such a society is harmful to both sexes, but especially to women. Indeed, for Cheney, the world's most fearful evil "is the wrong against woman,... which seems to be rooted in the ages, and to-day casts its poisonous slime over all countries, and all societies". What is required, therefore, is radical reform—the loftiest goal, Fuller had said, of the fully realized soul—so that "evident wrongs are eliminated and both sexes will develop in freedom and finally into perfect harmony". This harmony is not achievable without the free development of women. Ideally, the masculine and the feminine "play an equal part in the great drama of Life". Given the disharmony between the sexes and in society in general, however, "as the feminine represents attraction, this is the leading principle which draws us upward and on."

== Nietzsche ==
Friedrich Nietzsche had an ambivalent attitude to the eternal feminine. As Carol Diethe notes, on the one hand he mocked the self-righteous Wilhelmine women who fancied themselves its embodiment in relation to their husbands when actually they were (in Nietzsche's opinion) morally and spiritually bankrupt. On the other hand, his respect for Goethe meant he could not reject the notion outright, and for a time he even seems to have hoped that Lou Andreas-Salomé—a woman who also fascinated Rilke and Freud—would be to him a kind of spiritualized manifestation of the eternal feminine as helpmeet or muse. To his intense disappointment, however, she declined this role. Possibly, Diethe says, this was what made his tone so bitter when he came to attack the Wilhelmine version of the eternal feminine. Diethe also suggests that perhaps it is no coincidence that the phrase Ewige Wiederkehr (Eternal Recurrence) is remarkably similar to Ewig-Weibliche. Nietzsche had discussed the Eternal Recurrence with Lou Salomé on Monte Sacro in Rome in 1882. Frances Nesbitt Oppel also sees a connection here. She views the language of earth-symbolism—mother earth symbolizing transience and perishability—in Thus Spoke Zarathustra (1883–1892) as feminine, indicating that Nietzsche wants to emphasize the feminine nature of his doctrine: "The 'eternal feminine' in Zarathustra is the 'eternal return' which draws us ever downward, to the earth, to time, to the transitory." The feminine principle is articulated by Nietzsche within a continuity of life and death, based in large part on his readings of ancient Greek literature, since in Greek culture both childbirth and the care of the dead were managed by women.

Since, unlike Diethe, Oppel fails to distinguish between Goethe's eternal feminine and the Wilhelmine version of it, she tends to describe the former in terms more appropriate to the latter. Referring to its appearance at the end of Faust, for instance, she writes, "This mode of the eternal feminine reproduces the social injunction on the two-sex model to be wives, mothers, and moral guardians of men, and of their families." She is on firmer ground when she observes that the Nietzschean critique of the eternal feminine "is tied to another equally provocative polemic directed at Christianity". In Dawn (1881), Nietzsche writes of the hostility of "men of conscience" such as himself "to the whole of European feminism (or idealism, if you prefer that word), which is forever 'drawing us upward' and precisely thereby 'bringing us down'". For an anti-democrat like Nietzsche, Christianity, idealism and feminism were all part of the general levelling down of Western modernity to a mediocre 'herd' which was destroying its capacity to produce the exceptional individuals necessary to survival and growth. Thus, in The Happy Science (1882), he tells us that "'feminism' means 'of the feminine,'... connoting 'belief in God and Christian conscience: that is... feminism. It means idealism, in whatever form." In Twilight of the Idols (1888), he writes: "The Imitatio Christi is one of the books I cannot hold in my hands without experiencing a physical resistance: it exhales a parfum of the 'eternal feminine'." In Beyond Good and Evil (1886), he notes the parallels between what "Dante and Goethe believed of woman—the former when he sang 'ella guardava suso, ed io in lei' [she (Beatrice) looked upward, and I with/through her], the latter when he translated it as 'the eternal womanly draws us upward'."

In Beyond Good and Evil, Nietzsche says that his views on women depend on something unteachable deep down—that what we call our "convictions" about the sexes are mere "signposts to the problem which we are—or, better, the great stupidity which we are". After this admission, he hopes "that I will be allowed to speak out a few truths" about women, so long as people realize that they are "only my truths". Julian Young writes: "He concedes, in other words, that his views may be infected by a degree of prejudice. The source of prejudice this extremely self-aware man has in mind is surely obvious: the trauma of the Salomé affair." Young observes that by 1885 "the majority of Nietzsche's friends and admirers were not just women but feminist women", such as Malwida von Meysenbug, Helen Zimmern and Meta von Salis. According to Young, Nietzsche was inviting his feminist friends "to scrutinize his views very carefully with an eye to separating the philosophical from the possibly pathological." And that is what they did, for as Young notes, "Nietzsche's views on women are not merely offensive to modern opinion. They were offensive, too, to progressive opinion in the nineteenth century, including of course the opinion of many educated women." Nevertheless, many feminists were attracted to Nietzsche's philosophy by the accord they perceived between his message of liberation and their own. Their solution was to treat his anti-feminism as a personal quirk rather than an essential part of his philosophy. Young cites the example of Meta von Salis, who wrote that "a man of Nietzsche's breadth of vision and sureness of instinct has the right to get things wrong in one instance". Nietzsche, she thought, had made a reasonable but false generalization from the run of contemporary women to "the eternal feminine" and had failed to see that, while "the woman of the future who realizes a higher ideal of power and beauty in harmonious coexistence has not yet arrived", she will arrive.

"Perhaps," Nietzsche wrote in 1888, "I am the first psychologist of the eternal feminine. They all love me." In the second sentence he is clearly referring to his feminist friends; in the first not so much, since, as the comment by Meta von Salis just cited indicates, their conception of the eternal feminine was rather different from his (as he was well aware). The whole passage, notes Penelope Deutscher, "seems rather tongue-in-cheek". Quite how convoluted interpreting Nietzsche on the eternal feminine can be is suggested by another comment by Deutscher: "we might say that any notion of the eternal feminine that Nietzsche does invoke to denounce the idealist notion of an eternal feminine is a re-valued 'eternal feminine' and not the 'same', idealist eternal feminine he denounces".

"Man is a coward when confronted with the Eternal Feminine," Nietzsche wrote in 1888, "—and the females know it." As he explains in Beyond Good and Evil, "That in woman which arouses respect and often enough fear is her nature, which is 'more natural' than man's, her genuine, cunning, beast-of-prey suppleness, the tiger's claws under the glove, the naïveté of her egoism, her ineducability and inner wildness, and how incomprehensible, capacious and volatile her desires and virtues are." To go from "this dangerous and beautiful cat 'woman'" to "'woman as clerk'" is "stupidity,... an almost masculine stupidity". It doesn't even lessen the danger of abuse. "To lose an instinct for the ground on which she is surest of victory, to neglect to practice the art of her own proper weapons,... to seek with virtuous audacity to destroy man's faith that there is a fundamentally different ideal concealed in woman, that there is something eternally, necessarily feminine...—what does all this mean if not a crumbling away of feminine instinct, a loss of femininity?" Femininity is both "natural" and an art. In The Gay Science, Nietzsche had written that women are "first of all and above all actresses,... they 'put on something' even when they take off everything. Woman is so artistic." There is much here to arouse the ire of feminists—though some qualities Nietzsche ascribes to women, like egoism and ineducability, he also ascribes to himself, and he utilizes metaphors of animality, acting and concealment (particularly masks) for both sexes. There are also ideas, however, from which some feminists in the following decade were to take inspiration.

== New Woman ==
A representative feminist ideal of the 1890s, the New Woman, was often associated with the Eternal Feminine. Both were seen by conservative thinkers as "a threat to the male sphere". The New Woman has been succinctly described as "intelligent, educated, emancipated, independent and self-supporting". One representative article from 1895 claimed that it was impossible to go anywhere or read anything "without being continually reminded of the subject which lady-writers love to call the Woman Question", and observed: "'The Eternal Feminine,' the 'Revolt of the Daughters,' the Woman's Volunteer Movement, Women's Clubs, are significant expressions and effective landmarks." The main New Woman writers were Sarah Grand, Mona Caird and George Egerton (Mary Chavelita Dunne) in Britain and Kate Chopin and Charlotte Perkins Gilman in the United States.

Owing to her outspokenness about female desire, George Egerton was the most controversial of the New Women writers. Not only did she make the earliest reference to Nietzsche in English literature, but Nietzsche is the most frequent reference in her writings. Unsurprisingly, the Eternal Feminine in her fiction has a strongly Nietzschean stamp. In "A Cross Line", the first story in Keynotes (1893), Egerton's first collection, the female protagonist laughs softly to herself at "the denseness of man", musing that "the wisest of them can only say we are enigmas. Each one of them sits about solving the riddle of the ewig weibliche—and well it is that the workings of our hearts are closed to them, that we are cunning enough or great enough to seem to be what they would have us, rather than be what we are. But few of them have had the insight to find out the key to our seeming contradictions.... They have all overlooked the eternal wildness, the untamed primitive savage temperament that lurks in the mildest, best woman. Deep in through ages of convention this primeval trait burns, an untameable quantity that may be concealed but is never eradicated by culture—the keynote of woman's witchcraft and woman's strength." In passages like this, as Iveta Jusová observes, Egerton apparently "re-asserts the traditional unproductive binary division between (female) nature and (male) culture", but this assumption is "in the end undermined by Egerton's own discourse", which "exposes this postulate as impossible and locates presumably precultural 'nature' and desire within a larger concept of culture". Or, as Elke D'hoker argues (as paraphrased by Eleanor Fitzsimons), "Egerton avoids essentialism by presenting a pluralistic expression of women's desires."

== Charlotte Perkins Gilman ==
"'The eternal feminine,'" writes Charlotte Perkins Gilman in Women and Economics (1898), "means simply the eternal sexual." Whatever is masculine or feminine is sexual, so "to be distinguished by femininity is to be distinguished by sex." She gives an example: "'A feminine hand' or 'a feminine foot' is distinguishable anywhere." Gilman differentiates between primary sex characteristics (male or female reproductive organs), secondary sex characteristics (e.g. in women, enlarged breasts and widened hips), and what she calls sex-distinctions. The last, unlike the first two, are cultural rather than biological, and can be either "normal" or "excessive". Excessive sex-distinction (such as confining women to the home or denying them work they are fully capable of doing) does no one any good. As Gilman is at pains to show in Women and Economics and her other writings, to be "over-feminine" (or "over-masculine") has decidedly negative effects both on the individuals concerned and on society.

Gilman's use of the term "eternal feminine" tends to be in the Goethean mode. Criticizing the contemporary fashion in women's hats, she writes, "The first, last, and ever dominant necessity is to express as loudly as possible, not the 'eternal feminine,' but that abnormal pitiful femininity of ours, a femininity which has surrendered its solemn grandeur of womanhood, and put on, jackdaw-like, the ostentatious plumage of an alien creature." In "Woman and the State" (1910), she writes, "The 'eternal womanly' is a far more useful thing in the state than the 'eternal manly.'" In The Home: Its Work and Influence (1910), she writes with savage irony of a man with "a parasite wife" (i.e. a conventionally housebound, over-feminine one) coming home "to satisfying companionship with the 'eternal feminine.'" That Gilman is being ironic is clear from her later characterization of the "parasite wife" as a "dainty domestic vampire" with "insatiable demands" which the deluded husband "pours forth his life's service to meet."

== Psychoanalysis ==
=== Sigmund Freud ===
Sigmund Freud's only mention of the eternal feminine occurs in The Interpretation of Dreams (1900), where it is associated with female assertiveness and leadership. Freud recounts how a female colleague, Louise N., asked him to lend her something to read. He offered her She (1887), by H. Rider Haggard. "A strange book, but full of hidden meaning," he began to explain; "the eternal feminine, the immortality of our emotions..." But she interrupted him to say that she was already familiar with the book, and asked, with a touch of sarcasm, "Have you nothing of your own?... When are we to expect these so-called ultimate explanations of yours which you promised even we shall find readable." That night Freud has a dream in which his pelvis is dissected while Louise N. stands near. As the dream proceeds, Freud's anxieties about the reception of his as-yet-unpublished Interpretation of Dreams blend uneasily with several plot elements from She and Heart of the World, another novel by Rider Haggard. Freud notes that in both novels a woman is the leader—like Louise N. in their conversation—but he also notes that She "instead of finding immortality for herself and the others perishes in the mysterious subterranean fire". As Kathy Alexis Psomiades writes, "In this way, She becomes a figure for Freud himself, and his struggle for immortality in his works."

=== Carl Jung ===
The Swiss psychoanalyst Carl Jung was an avid reader of Goethe since adolescence, and he regarded the Faust poems as having quasi-Biblical authority. He discussed the Eternal Feminine in a number of his books, notably his 1946 The Psychology of the Transference.

=== Rollo May ===
For Rollo May in Love and Will (1969), it is through relation that the eternal feminine "draws us upward". May associates the eternal feminine with eros, which he describes as "the power which attracts us"; that which "draws us from ahead"; "the drive toward ... union with our own possibilities, union with significant other persons"; the yearning for "arete, the noble and good life"; "the mode of relating" through which we seek "new dimensions of experience which broaden and deepen" our own being and that of others. In the context of the Cold War, May sees the atom bomb as symbolic of "our alienation" from ourselves, from others and from nature. He writes, "It is not a far cry from experiencing the splitting of the atom as gaining power over the 'eternal feminine.'"

In The Cry for Myth (1991), May writes that Goethe's depiction of Faust "reflects the essence of the behavior of modern man." The depiction is hardly flattering. Does it, May asks rhetorically, apply to Goethe himself? He cites Ortega's judgement that "Goethe had never really found himself, never lived out ... his true destiny in life." Ednah Dow Cheney had seen it as Goethe's "tragedy" that he "never had a full and perfect relation to a woman," but expended himself in "transitory affections." A century later, May, too, brings up the unfulfilling and at times exploitative nature of Goethe's liaisons with women, and wonders whether he wrote Faust partly "to relieve his own guilt." And yet Faust is redeemed. The play's final words "sing out the saving quality of the eternal feminine."

May's explanation for this is that "Each myth in human history is interpreted according to the needs of the society which it reflects. Marlowe's Renaissance needed ... bringing literal hell into the picture. But Goethe's Enlightenment needed a quite different abreaction." One of Goethe's purposes in writing Faust, May says, "was to explore the myths of the life of humanism, to search out every way to help human beings discover and live by their greatest callings." Progress for Goethe "meant human beings learning to be conscious of their richest unique capacities, and thus have 'life and have it more abundantly.' ... This is embodied in the 'eternal feminine.'"

== Zora Neale Hurston ==
In a much-quoted passage from Zora Neale Hurston's autobiographical essay "How It Feels to Be Colored Me" (1928), the eternal feminine, including its cosmic aspect, contributes significantly to Hurston's secure sense of self-worth as a black American woman:

At certain times I have no race. I am me. When I set my hat at a certain angle and saunter down Seventh Avenue, Harlem City, feeling as snooty as the lions in front of the Forty-Second Street Library, for instance.... The cosmic Zora emerges. I belong to no race nor time. I am the eternal feminine with its string of beads.

I have no separate feeling about being an American citizen and colored. I am merely a fragment of the Great Soul that surges within the boundaries. My country, right or wrong.

As one scholar observes immediately before quoting the above passage, "If one wanted to find an example of a black American woman who is at ease with being black and yet being convinced that she is an authentic part of greater humankind, one should read Hurston's essay." Hurston continues:

Sometimes I feel discriminated against, but it does not make me angry. It merely astonishes me. How can any deny themselves the pleasure of my company. It's beyond me.

== Later developments ==
In the last third of the twentieth century, the eternal feminine was often regarded, typically without reference to Goethe's original conception, as a psychological archetype or philosophical principle that idealizes an immutable concept of "woman". It was seen as one component of gender essentialism, the belief that men and women have different core "essences" that cannot be altered by time or environment. Such a conceptual ideal was particularly vivid in the 19th century, when women were often depicted as angelic, responsible for drawing men upward on a moral and spiritual path. Among those virtues variously regarded as essentially feminine are "modesty, gracefulness, purity, delicacy, civility, compliancy, reticence, chastity, affability, [and] politeness".

Sandra Gilbert and Susan Gubar state that for Goethe, "woman" symbolized pure contemplation, in contrast to masculine action—a dubious claim since, as Rollo May points out, Goethe's drama "ends with a verse that lauds action." The German word "getan" at the end of the line immediately preceding "Das Ewig-Weibliche" (The Eternal-Feminine) refers specifically to doing, acting, accomplishing. Besides, the "us" that the Eternal-Feminine leads onward is equally male and female.

== In classical music ==
The concluding lines of Goethe's Faust on the "eternal feminine" were set to music by Robert Schumann in the last chorus of his Scenes from Goethe's Faust, by Franz Liszt at the end of the last movement of his Faust Symphony, and by Gustav Mahler in the last chorus of his Eighth Symphony.

== In popular culture ==
In Wide Is the Gate, the fourth novel of the Lanny Budd series by Upton Sinclair, Lanny says to Gertrud Schultz, "What Goethe calls das ewig weibliche is seldom out of my consciousness; I don't think it is ever entirely out of any man's consciousness."

== See also ==
- The Angel in the House
- Cult of Domesticity
- Gender role
- Ideal womanhood
- Erich Neumann (psychologist)
- New Woman
- Separate spheres
- Thealogy
- Yamato nadeshiko
