= Virgin Soil (short story) =

Short story written by Mary Chavelita Dunne

Virgin Soil is a short story written by Mary Chavelita Dunne under her pseudonym George Egerton. This story was published as part of a series of short stories in a book called Discords. Discords was published in 1894 by Roberts Brothers in Boston, Massachusetts.

== Plot ==
This short story opens with a post wedding scene between a gray-haired older man and a seventeen-year-old bride. The daughter cries on her mother after the ceremony and her mother responds by telling her she is married now and that she must obey her new husband. Then the bride and groom depart together on a train to begin their married life. The story flashes forward five years and the once young bride has come back home to see her mother. She has not been home since her marriage and remembers her childhood fondly as she wonders through her childhood home. Then she sees her mother resting in a chair and is astonished how she has not aged significantly within those five years. She stops to observe her own reflection in a mirror and notice how much she has aged since her wedding day. She notices that her spark, innocence, and youth is gone and then quickly turns to her mother and shakes her awake. Her mother is excited to see her but Flo, her daughter, responds harshly stating she needs to speak with her. The two of them sit down for tea to talk.

Flo's mother asked how her husband is. And Flo responds by telling her he is currently in Paris with another woman. Her mother is shocked while her daughter comments how she only wishes that he took these trips more frequently. Her mother then scolds Flo for not saving from her husband of the sin of adultery. Flo states that she is leaving her husband because she is very unhappy. She explains that the fundamentals of marriage are unequal and essentially legal prostitution. Her mother remarks that she thought her daughter's husband, Philip, was such as respectful match. Flo explains that her marriage and the hurt it caused her is her mother's fault because her mother did not prepare her for what marriage was and instead only advised her to obey her husband. She said that she was sold in exchange for a home, clothes, and food. She was clueless as to what her wifely duties included and the amount of intimacy that would be given to him. Her marriage stole her sweetness and youth and caused her to hate herself and her mother for placing her in this position. The story flashes to later in the evening as Flo is sleeping and her mother kisses her and slips notes into her bag. In the morning, Flo leaves and takes the train in the opposite direction of where her home with Philip is.

== Scholarship ==
This story is representative of the evolution of women's roles and power in society during the time that the story is written. These women roles are in a direction juxtaposition when comparing Flo to her mother character. Flo's mother is a stereotypical Victorian woman with an old-fashioned mindset . The mother at her daughter's wedding shows no signs of maturity as she offers no advice, no explanation of sex, and instead tells her to simply obey her new husband, the advice she most likely received from her own mother . Her responds to Flo explaining her harmful marriage and her decision to leave is what will society think and the scandal that will ensue . Flo sets herself apart from her mother first in her appearance as she is described with firm, strong features. Flo represents the brand-new view version of womanhood. A woman who understands of the unfairness of power in society and the lack of justice for women's roles in the nineteenth century.

The evolution of women in society is also represented by Flo's character development throughout the story. The first half of the story depict Flo as a young innocent bride that is a victim to a “gray-haired man” with “strong white teeth”. When Flo returns to her childhood home five year later, she has had to learn about men, the power imbalance to women, and the role of marriage. Flo is no longer a victim and has grown the strength to break free from her marriage and confront her mother. Flo's youth and innocence has disappeared, and this transformation is marked by her change in appearance.

While Flo details the horrors of her marriage, her mother remarks that if only she would have had a child, then Flo may have been happier. However Flo states that this would have been her last straw to carry his child inside of her. This has been interpreted by many scholars as an illusion to a possible abortion that Flo may have obtained. Abortion was criminalized in 1803 and thus covert and secretive in nature. Flo was trapped in a marriage and her duties included submitting to her husband's every sexual need. This story paints abortion as a byproduct of marriage abuse during this time period and as a woman's last line of defense from their continued victimization.

Flo's decision to confront her mother and blame her for her marriage abuse represents some of the rage of the New Women movement. Flo states that “whatever of misery is in the whole matter rests solely and entirely with you mother”. At first glance, Flo angry towards her mother may seem misplace; however this is a common critique of New Women authors. They place blame on women for aiding in the continued oppression of women by mothers molding their daughters into willing victims for the social norm of unequal position of marriage often ripe with abuse.
