= The Imitation of Christ =

Devotional book by Thomas à Kempis

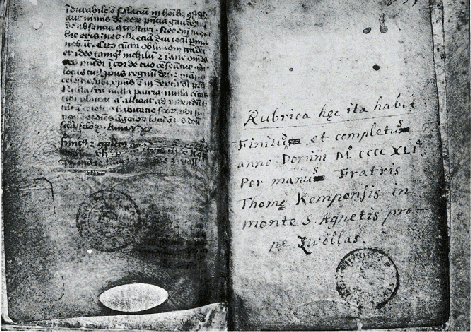
- The manuscript of De Imitatione Christi. Koninklijke Bibliotheek, Brussels, Belgium
- Author: Thomas à Kempis
- Original title: De Imitatione Christi
- Language: Latin
- Genre: Christian devotional literature
- Publication date: c. 1418–1427
- Publication place: Holy Roman Empire
- Dewey Decimal: 242
- LC Class: BV4821 .A1
- Text: The Imitation of Christ at Wikisource

The Imitation of Christ is a Christian devotional book by Thomas à Kempis, composed in Medieval Latin as De Imitatione Christi c. 1418–1427. The devotional text is divided into four books of detailed spiritual instructions: (i) "Helpful Counsels of the Spiritual Life", (ii) "Directives for the Interior Life", (iii) "On Interior Consolation", and (iv) "On the Blessed Sacrament". The devotional approach of The Imitation of Christ emphasises the interior life and withdrawal from the mundanities of the world, as opposed to the active imitation of Christ practised by other friars. The devotions of the books emphasize devotion to the Eucharist as the key element of spiritual life.

The Imitation of Christ is a handbook for the spiritual life arising from the Devotio Moderna movement, which Thomas followed. The Imitation is perhaps the most widely read Christian devotional work after the Bible, and is regarded as a devotional and religious classic. The book was written anonymously in Latin in the Netherlands c. 1418–1427. Its popularity was immediate, and after the first printed edition in 1471–1472, it was printed in 745 editions before 1650. Apart from the Bible, no book had been translated into more languages than the Imitation of Christ at the time.

== Background and history ==
=== Background ===
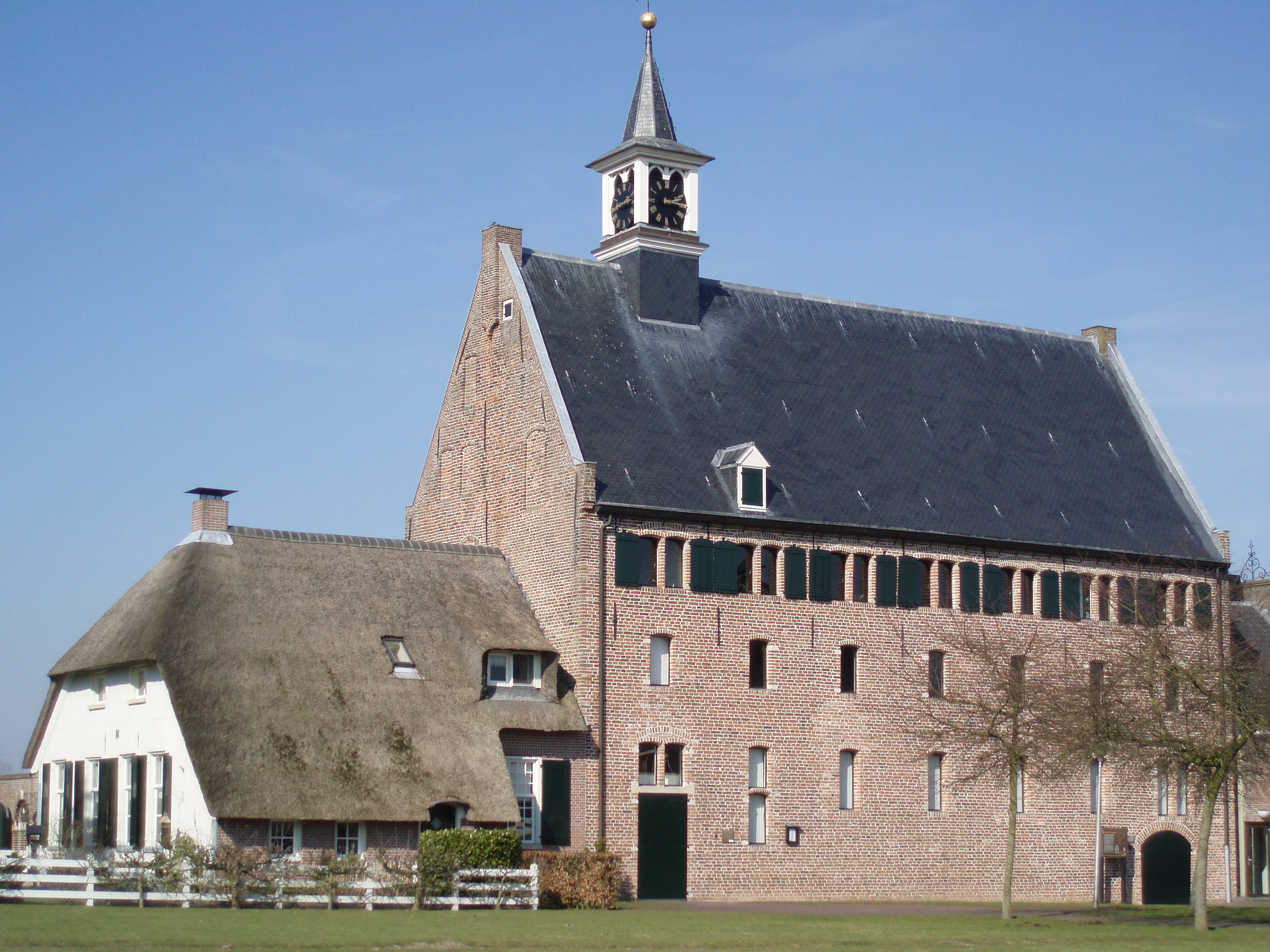
Modern photo of Windesheim (Netherlands), where Devotio Moderna took root

The ideal of the imitation of Christ has been an important element of Christian theology, ethics and spirituality. References to this concept and its practice are found in the earliest Christian documents, such as the Pauline Epistles.

The imitation of Christ is the subject of some of Gregory of Nyssa's Latin ascetical works: Ad Harmonium quid nomen professione christianorum sibi velit ("To Harmonius, that is, what matters the name and profession of a Christian"); Ad Olympium monachum et qualem oporteat esse Christianum ("To the monk Olympius, what a Christian should be").

Saint Augustine viewed the imitation of Christ as the fundamental purpose of Christian life, and as a remedy for the imitation of the sins of Adam. Saint Francis of Assisi believed in the physical as well as the spiritual imitation of Christ, and advocated a path of poverty and preaching like Jesus who was poor at birth in the manger and died naked on the cross. The theme of imitation of Christ existed in all phases of Byzantine theology, and in the 14th-century book Life in Christ, Nicholas Cabasilas viewed "living one's own personal life" in Christ as the fundamental Christian virtue.

Against this backdrop, the Devotio Moderna movement was started by Geert Groote who was highly dissatisfied with the state of the Church and what he perceived as the gradual loss of monastic traditions and the lack of moral values among the clergy. The initial focus of Devotio Moderna was the rediscovery of genuine pious practices and conversion and re-conversion of the lukewarm clergy. The Imitation was written within the Devotio Moderna community, as it was flourishing in Northern Europe, but grew far beyond that movement which came to an end with the Protestant Reformation.

=== History ===
The Imitation was written anonymously in Latin in the Netherlands c. 1418–1427, and until the seventeenth century, was attributed without much dispute to Thomas à Kempis who, according to Mabillon, was still assumed to be the author in 1651. Taking advantage of the anonymous nature of the book, however, and driven by an esprit de corps exaggerated by national sentiment, Italian Benedictines attributed the Imitation to Giovanni Gersen, the abbot of Saint Etienne de Verceil c. 1250, and French scholars claimed it to be the work of Jean Gerson, the renowned chancellor of the University of Paris. Other scholars attributed it to Bonaventure, Bernard of Clairvaux, Henri Kalkar or Ludolph of Saxony. These controversies have led some critics to allege that the Imitation was merely an impersonal compilation of various mystical authors of the Middle Ages. Nevertheless, Thomas à Kempis is generally accepted as the author by modern scholars and several sources of authority, including members of his own order, name Kempis as the author. Furthermore, various contemporary manuscripts, including one autograph codex, bear his name.

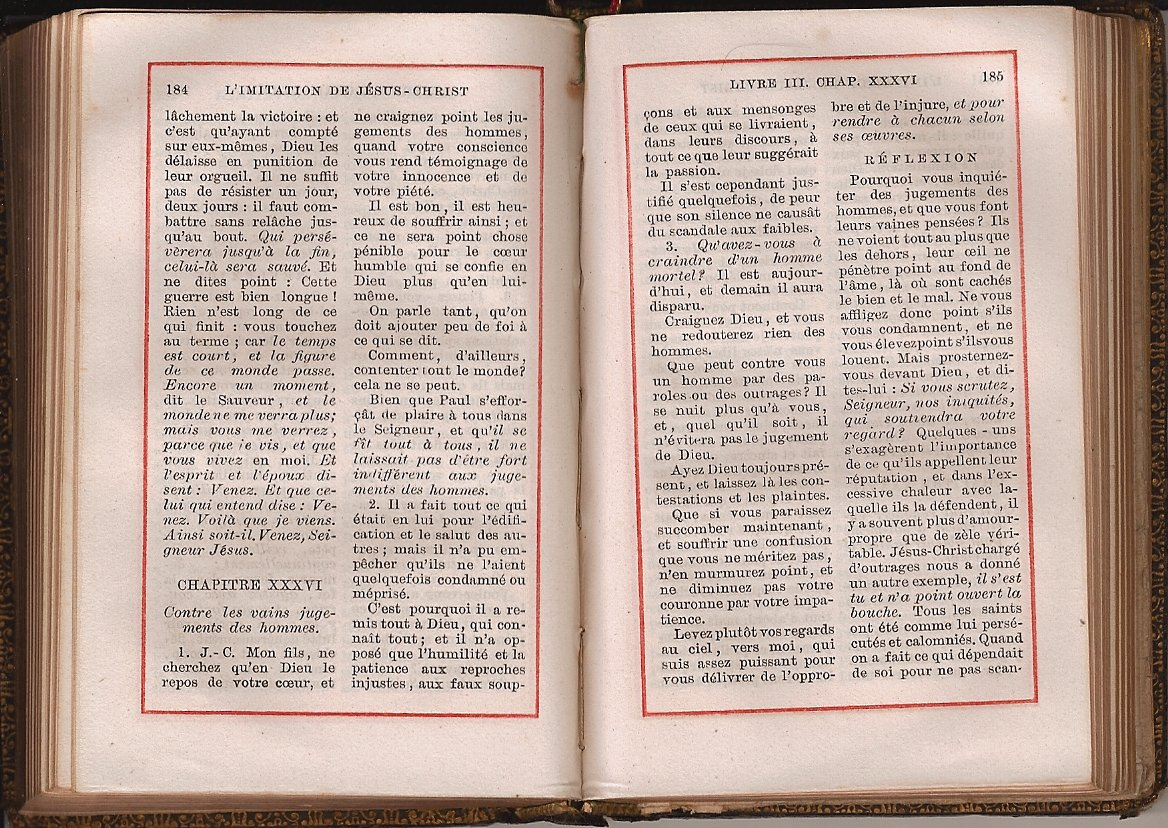
An 1874 edition from Tours, France

Joseph N. Tylenda, S.J., writes that the book's anonymous composition is "not surprising" since the author writes in the Imitation that one should "love to be unknown" (Book 1, Ch. 2). Regarding the anonymity of the work, William C. Creasy also notes that the author of the Imitation wrote, "Do not let the writer's authority or learning influence you, be it little or great, but let the love of pure truth attract you to read. Do not ask, 'Who said this?' but pay attention to what is said" (Book 1, Ch. 5).

By 1471, the manuscripts of the book were so frequently hand-copied and passed across monasteries, that there are around 750 extant manuscripts of the Imitation. Thomas à Kempis's 1441 autograph manuscript of the book is available at the Bibliothèque Royale in Brussels. The first printed edition appeared in Augsburg c. 1471–72. By the end of the 15th century, the book had more than 100 printed editions and translations in Italian (1480), Catalan (1482), German (1486), French (1488), Low German (1489), Spanish (1490), Portuguese and Dutch (1496).

The book received an enthusiastic response from the very early days, as characterized by the statement of George Pirkhamer, the prior of Nuremberg, regarding the 1494 edition: "Nothing more holy, nothing more honorable, nothing more religious, nothing in fine more profitable for the Christian commonwealth can you ever do than to make known these works of Thomas à Kempis."

The number of counted editions exceeds 2,000; 1,000 different editions are preserved in the British Museum; 770 in the Biblioteca de Catalunya Kempis Collection; the Bullingen collection, donated to the city of Cologne in 1838, contained at the time 400 different editions. De Backer enumerates 545 Latin and about 900 French editions. A critical edition was published in 1982.

== Teachings ==
The Imitation of Christ is divided into four books which provide detailed spiritual instructions.

=== Book One ===
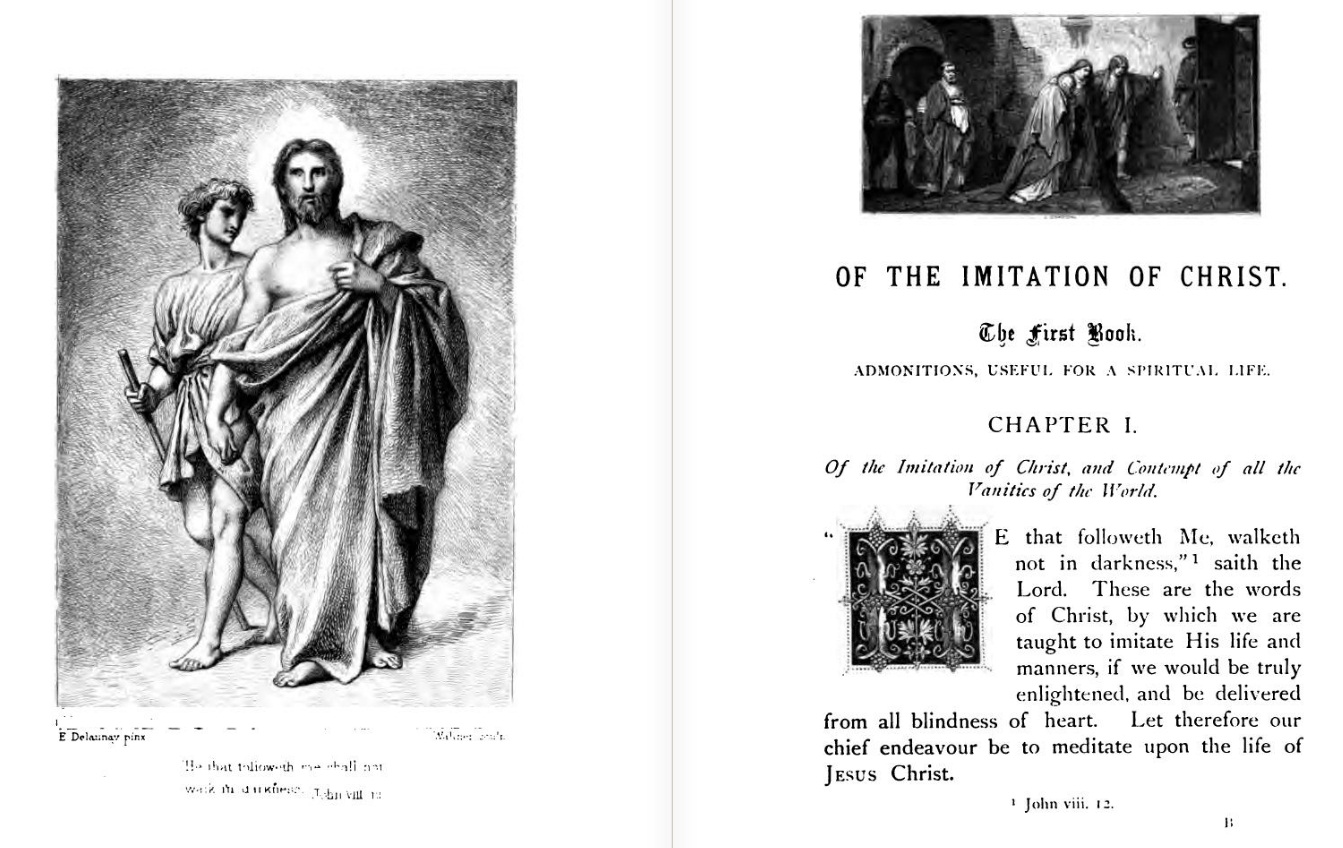
Chap. 1 from The Imitation of Christ, Chapman & Hall (1878)

Book One of the Imitation is titled "Helpful Counsels of the Spiritual Life". The Imitation derives its title from the first chapter of Book I, "The Imitation of Christ and contempt for the vanities of the world" (Latin: "De Imitatione Christi et contemptu omnium vanitatum mundi"). The Imitation is sometimes referred to as Following of the Christ, which comes from the opening words of the first chapter—"Whoever follows Me will not walk into darkness." Book One deals with the withdrawal of the outward life—so far as positive duty allows and emphasizes an interior life by renouncing all that is vain and illusory, resisting temptations and distractions of life, giving up the pride of learning and to be humble, forsaking the disputations of theologians and patiently enduring the world's contempt and contradiction.

Kempis stresses the importance of solitude and silence, "how undisturbed a conscience we would have if we never went searching after ephemeral joys nor concerned ourselves with affairs of the world..." Kempis writes that the "World and all its allurements pass away" and following sensual desires leads to a "dissipated conscience" and a "distracted heart" (Chap. 20). Kempis writes that one should meditate on death and "live as becomes a pilgrim and a stranger on earth...for this earth of ours is no lasting city" (Chap. 23). On the Day of Judgement, Kempis writes that a good and pure conscience will give more joy than all the philosophy one has ever learned, fervent prayer will bring more happiness than a "multi-course banquet", the silence will be more "exhilarating" than long tales, holy deeds will be of greater value than nice-sounding words (Chap. 24).

Kempis writes one must remain faithful and fervent to God, and keep good hope of attaining victory and salvation, but avoid overconfidence. Kempis gives the example of an anxious man who, oscillating between fear and hope and with grief went to the altar and said: "Oh, if only I knew that I shall persevere to the end." Immediately he heard the divine answer, "What if you knew this? What would you do? Do now what you would do then, and you will be very safe." After this the man gave himself to God's will, and his anxiety and fear of the future disappeared (Chap. 25).

=== Book Two ===
Book Two of the Imitation is "Directives for the Interior Life". The book continues the theme of Book One, and contains instructions concerning "inward peace, purity of heart, a good conscience—for moderating our longings and desires, for patience, for submission to the will of God, for the love of Jesus, for enduring the loss of comfort, and for taking up the Cross." Kempis writes that if we have a clear conscience, God will defend us, and whomever God chooses to help no man's malice can harm. Kempis writes that when a man humbles himself, "God protects and defends him...God favors the humble man... and after he has been brought low raises him up to glory" (Chap. 2). Kempis stresses the importance of a good conscience—"The man whose conscience is pure easily finds peace and contentment... Men only see your face, but it is God who sees your heart. Men judge according to external deeds, but only God can weigh the motives behind them" (Chap. 6). Kempis writes we must place our faith in Jesus rather than in men and "...Do not trust nor lean on a reed that is shaken ...All flesh is grass, and all its glory shall fade like the flower in the field" (Chap. 7). Kempis writes that a false sense of freedom and overconfidence are obstacles for spiritual life. Kempis writes that "Grace will always be given to the truly grateful, and what is given to the humble is taken away from the proud" (Chap. 10).

Kempis writes that we must not attribute any good to ourselves but attribute everything to God. Kempis asks us to be grateful for "every little gift" and we will be worthy to receive greater ones, to consider the least gift as great and the most common as something special. Kempis writes that if we consider the dignity of the giver, no gift will seem unimportant or small (Chap. 10). In the last chapter, "The Royal Road of the Cross", Kempis writes that if we carry the cross willingly, it will lead us to our desired goal, but on the other hand if we carry our cross grudgingly, then we turn it into a heavy burden and if we should throw off one cross, we will surely find another, which is perhaps heavier. Kempis writes that by ourselves we cannot bear the cross, but if we put our trust in the Lord, He will send us strength from heaven (Chap. 12).

=== Book Three ===
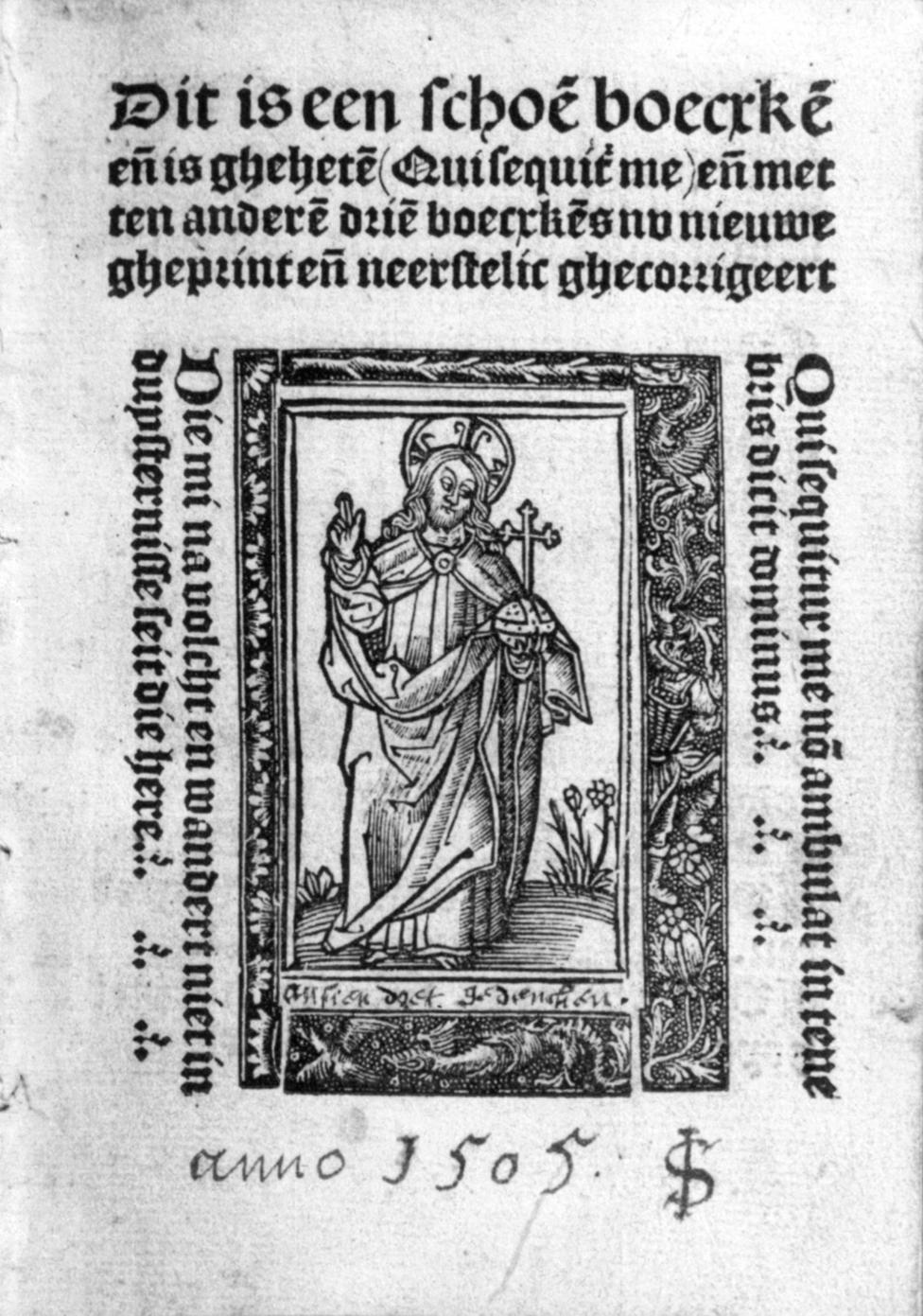
The 1505 edition, Museum Catharijneconvent, Utrecht, the Netherlands

Book Three, entitled "On Interior Consolation", is the longest among the four books. This book is in the form of a dialogue between Jesus and the disciple.

Jesus says that very few turn to God and spirituality, since they are more eager to listen to the world and desires of their flesh than to God. Jesus says that the world promises things that are passing and of little value, which are served with great enthusiasm; while He promises things that are most excellent and eternal and men's hearts remain indifferent (Chap. 3). Jesus says that the "man who trusts in Me I never send away empty. When I make a promise I keep it, and I fulfill whatever I have pledged—if only you remain faithful...unto the end" (Chap. 3).

Jesus says that spiritual progress and perfection consists in offering oneself to the divine will and not seeking oneself in "anything either small or great, in time or in eternity" (Chap. 25). Jesus says do not be anxious about the future—"Do not let your heart be troubled and do not be afraid." Jesus advises the disciple that all is not lost when the result is not as planned, and when one thinks he is farthest from Jesus, it is then that Jesus is nearest, and when one thinks that all is lost, it is then that victory is close at hand. Jesus says not to react to a difficulty as if there were no hope of being freed from it (Chap. 30).

Joseph Tylenda summarizes the central theme of the third book with the teaching in Chapter 56, "My son, to the degree that you can leave yourself behind, to that degree will you be able to enter into Me. Just as desiring nothing outside you produces internal peace within you, so the internal renunciation of yourself unites you to God." Jesus gives his important teaching, "Follow Me...I am the Way, the Truth, and the Life. Without the Way, there is no going; without the Truth, there is no knowing; without Life, there is no living. I am the Way you are to follow; I am the Truth you are to believe; I am the Life you are to hope for" (Chap. 56).

=== Book Four ===
Book Four of the Imitation, "On the Blessed Sacrament", is also in the form of a dialogue between Jesus and the disciple. Kempis writes that in this Sacrament spiritual grace is conferred, the soul's strength is replenished, and the recipient's mind is fortified and strength is given to the body debilitated by sin (Chap. 1).

Jesus says that the sooner one resigns wholeheartedly to God, and no longer seeks anything according to one's own will or pleasure, but totally places all in God's hands, the sooner will one be united with God and be at peace. Jesus continues, "Nothing will make you happier or please you as much as being obedient to the divine will" (Chap. 15). Jesus also delivers his "changeless teaching" — "Unless you renounce all that you have, you cannot be my disciple" (Chap. 8).

To receive the Sacrament, Jesus says "make clean the mansions of your heart. Shut out the whole world and all its sinful din and sit as a solitary sparrow on a housetop and, in the bitterness of your soul, meditate on your transgressions" (Chap. 12). Jesus says that there is no offering more worthy, no satisfaction greater, for the washing away of sins than to offer oneself purely and completely to God at the time the Body of Christ is offered in the Mass and in Communion (Chap. 7).

== Influence ==
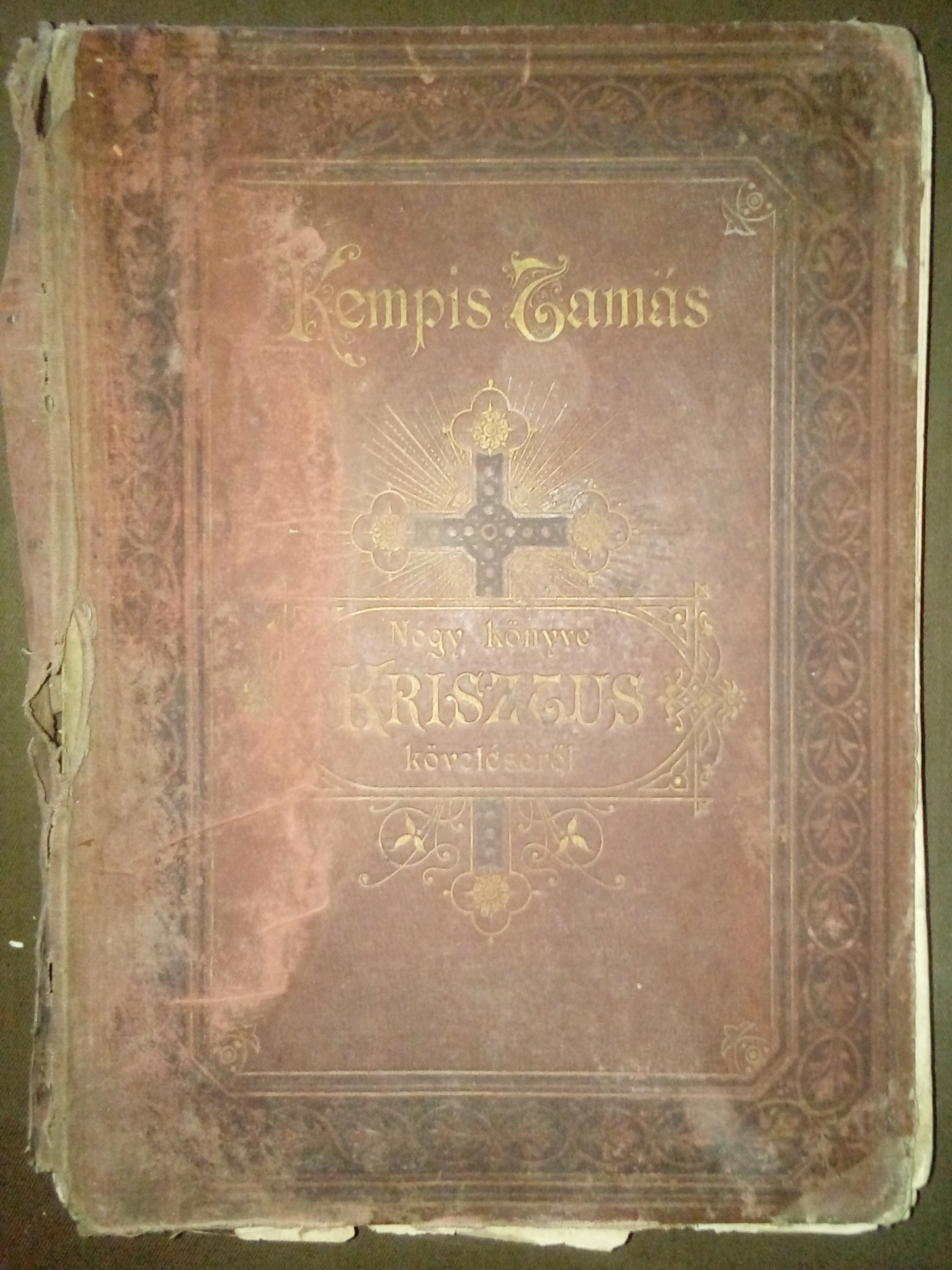
Hungarian edition, 1891, Nagyvárad

The Imitation of Christ is regarded as the most important devotional work in Catholic Christianity and is the most widely read devotional work next to the Bible. Apart from the Bible no Christian book has been translated into more languages than the Imitation of Christ.

The book was admired by the following individuals: Saint Thomas More, Chancellor of England and renowned humanist who was executed by King Henry VIII of England; Saint Ignatius of Loyola, founder of the Society of Jesus, Erasmus of Rotterdam, Louis XVI; and twentieth-century American Catholic author and monk Thomas Merton. It also has been admired by many others, both Catholic and Protestant. The Jesuits give it an official place among their "exercises". Kempis' Imitatio Christi was in close parentage with Ignatius of Loyola of the Devotio moderna movement, and also it was affirmed and practiced by St. Francis de Sales, profoundly influencing his Introduction to the Devout Life.

John Wesley, the founder of the Methodist movement, listed The Imitation among the works that influenced him at his conversion. General Gordon carried it with him to the battlefield.

José Rizal, the Philippine polymath and national hero, reportedly read the book whilst incarcerated within Fort Santiago in Intramuros, Manila, shortly before the Spanish colonial government executed him by firing squad for sedition on 30 December 1896.

Swami Vivekananda, the 19th-century Hindu philosopher and founder of the Vedanta Society, drew a number of parallels between the teachings of the Imitation and the Bhagavad Gita. Vivekananda wrote a preface and a translation of the Imitation in 1899. Vivekananda would always carry a copy of the Bhagavad Gita and the Imitation. Spiritual writer Eknath Easwaran compared the teachings of the Imitation with the Upanishads.

The Imitation of Christ was an early influence on the spirituality of Saint Thérèse of Lisieux, who used it in her prayer life, distilled its message and used it in her own writings which then influenced Catholic spirituality as a whole. Thérèse was so attached to the book and read it so many times that she could quote passages from it from memory in her teens. In her own autobiography she claims that she had memorized it in its entirety.

The theologian Shailer Mathews wrote that the Imitation presents an accurate description of the Christ of the Gospels, and gives an unbiased reading of the words of Jesus. He also wrote "For centuries men have found in it inspiration to sacrifice and humility, and to severest self-examination...He who has never come under its influence has missed something that would have made him more humble and more ambitious for purity of life."

The Spanish crypto-Muslim writer known as the Young Man of Arévalo included adaptations of many passages from the Imitation in his Islamic devotional work Summary of the Account and Spiritual Exercise. He replaced specific Christian contexts and features with Islamic ones, while keeping the spiritual and moral meaning intact. The adaptation of Christian devotional literature in his Islamic work was likely the result of his being obligated to attend missionary sermons (after forced conversions of Muslims in Spain), and a lack of access to actual Islamic literature.

== Criticisms ==
The theologian Hans Urs von Balthasar wrote:

It rejects and eliminates every speculative element not only of scholasticism but also of mysticism, and yet, at the same time, it abstracts from the colourful multiplicity of the Bible and—since it is written for those who have turned from the world—disregards the world, in all its richness, as a field for Christian activity... In place of the openhearted readiness of a Catherine of Siena, a subdued and melancholy resignation runs through the book.... [T]here is an excess of warnings about the world, the illusions of egoism, the dangers of speculation and of the active apostolate. In this way, even the idea of the imitation of Christ does not become the dominant perspective. There is no mention of the mediation of the God-man, of access through Christ, in the Holy Spirit, to the Father. The mystery of the Church, therefore, does not come into view either. The individual is unaware that his love of God can only be fulfilled if it expands into love of neighbor and into the apostolate. All [that] remains is a flight from the world, a world that has not been brought home in Christ.

René Girard wrote: "Neither does Jesus propose an ascetic rule of life in the sense of Thomas à Kempis and his celebrated Imitation of Christ, as admirable as that work may be".

Friedrich Nietzsche stated that this was "one of those books which I cannot hold in my hand without a physiological reaction: it exudes a perfume of the Eternal-Feminine which is strictly for Frenchmen—or Wagnerians".

== See also ==
- Christian mysticism
- Vita Christi
- What Would Jesus Do?
