= Giovanni Gersen =

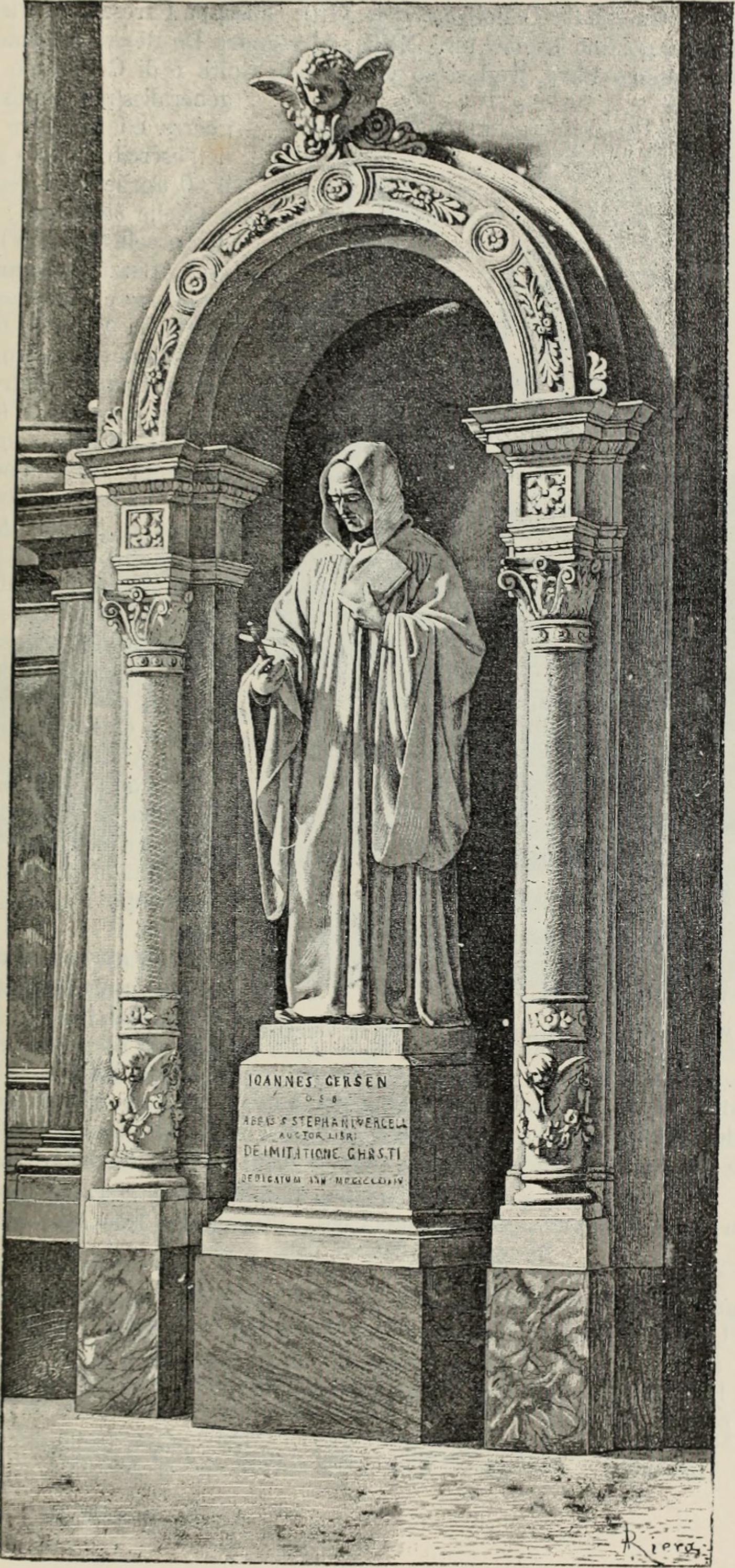
Monument to Giovanni Gersen in Vercelli Cathedral, Italy. Print from 1890.

Giovanni Gersen (born 1243), born in Cavaglià as Giovanni da Cavaglià, was an Italian Christian monk of the Benedictine order. Due to a scarcity of source material, not much is known about his life, and his very existence is a matter of doubt, as his name appears to be nothing more than an alteration of "Gerson". He is one author to whom the Imitation of Christ is attributed, having allegedly written it between 1220 and 1240.
