= A Cross Line =

"A Cross Line" is a short story written by George Egerton, also known as Mary Chavelita Dunne. The story appeared in a collection of short stories titled Keynotes, published in 1893. It follows the interaction between a woman and a fisherman.

== Plot ==
The short story begins by introducing a woman. She meets a fisherman and asks him where the river stream is most plentiful with trout. Their conversation becomes more playful as they continue to speak to one another. They flirt with each other and exchange playful banter, but they never cross the line with physical touch because the woman is married.

== Reception ==
When Egerton first published Keynotes, she received rather positive reactions. She was praised for depicting women's experiences and for presenting their souls to her audience. The short stories were well received until criticism began to arise. The subject matter Egerton presented was a bit shocking to many readers. The sexual nature and non-traditional depiction of women caused reviewers to deem her works "indecent." Her works were targeted due to the reviewers' claims of aggressiveness and lack of manners.
