= The Meaning of Anxiety =

1950 book by Rollo May

- First edition
- Author: Rollo May
- Language: English
- Genre: Non-fiction
- Publication date: 1950

Meaning of Anxiety is a book by Rollo May. It was published first in 1950 and then again in a revised 1977 edition. The book is notable for questioning fundamental assumptions about mental health and asserts that anxiety in fact aids in the development of an ultimately healthy personality. The revised edition discusses the in-between two and half decades of research on anxiety, especially that of Charles Spielberger. Other researchers and their work mentioned include Richard Lazarus, James Averill, and Seymour Epstein among others. May says his views are close to those of H. D. Kimmel, a critic of behaviorists.

== See also ==
- Personality development
- Rollo May
