= The Cry for Myth =

1991 book by Rollo May

- First edition (US)
- Author: Rollo May
- Language: English
- Subject: Psychology, psychotherapy
- Genre: Existential Psychology
- Publisher: Delta
- Publication date: 1991 W. W. Norton & Company
- Publication place: U.S.A
- Pages: 320
- ISBN: 0-385-30685-7

The Cry for Myth (1991) is a book by the American existential psychologist Rollo May, in which he proposes that modern people need myths to make sense of their lives, and that without myth they are prey to anxiety and addiction.

The book explores numerous myths from Classical Greece through to twentieth century writers, and shows their relevance to the personal existential dilemmas of today. The book is divided into four parts: "The function of myths," "Myths in America," "Myths of the Western World" and "Myths for Survival."

== The function of myths ==
=== What is a myth? ===
Myths are like the beams in a house: not exposed to outside view, they are the structure which holds the house together so people can live in it.

— (p 15)

"Myths are narrative patterns that give significance to our existence." (p 15) "As long as our world and society remain... empty of myths, which express beliefs and moral goals, there will be depression... and suicide." (p 21) "In such directionless states as we find ourselves near the end of the twentieth century, it is not surprising that frantic people flock to the new cults, or resurrect the old ones, seeking answers to their anxiety and longing for relief from their guilt or depressions, longing for something to fill the vacuum of their lives." (p 22)

Max Muller, writing in 1873, states "Depend upon it, there is mythology now as there was in the time of Homer, only we do not perceive it, because we ourselves live in the very shadow of it, and because we all shrink from the full meridian light of truth."

Myths are dramatic representations of the human condition. "Myth... is an eternal truth in contrast to an empirical truth. The latter can change with every morning newspaper, when we read of the latest discoveries in our laboratories. But the myth transcends time" (p 27). Oedipus is a man who cries out,"I must find out who I am!".

=== Our personal crises in myths ===
Myths contribute to our lives in at least four ways:

- they give us a sense of who we are
- they make possible our loyalties to communal groups
- they support our moral values
- they address the mysteries of creation and creativity

"When Jean-Paul Sartre needed a modern drama to communicate to the despairing French people, while Paris was being occupied by the Germans in World War II, he chose the ancient drama of Orestes." (p 40)

"Arthur Miller's Death of a Salesman presents a powerful myth for millions of Americans and for this reason is played time and again over television and on stages throughout America" (p 43). "Willy was a salesman. And for a salesman, there is no rock bottom to the life. He don't put a bolt to a nut... He's a man way out there in the blue, riding on a smile and a shoeshine. And when they start not smiling back—that's an earthquake." Willy Loman, the salesman, has lived by the "dream of coming out number-one." In the end it has not been enough; he commits suicide—"he never knew who he was"—he never had a satisfying personal myth.

=== In search of our roots ===
"Our powerful hunger for myth is a hunger for community. The person without a myth is a person without a home... To be a member of one's community is to share its myths, to feel the same pride that glows within us when we recall the Pilgrims at Plymouth Rock, or Washington crossing the Delaware, or Daniel Boone and Kit Carson riding into the West. The outsider, the foreigner, the stranger is the one who does not share our myths, the one who steers by different stars, worships different gods." (p 45)

Alex Haley found it necessary to search out his ancestor Kunta Kinte in West Africa to establish his roots and enhance his sense of personal identity. The popularity of his book and television series Roots may indicate that large numbers of Americans feel rootless.

== Myths in America ==
=== The Great Myth of the New Land ===
Our most powerful and persuasive myth, which has had an amazingly widespread influence in this country and wherever radio is heard throughout the world, is that of the lone cowboy and the west.

— (p 96)

=== Individualism and Our Age of Narcissism ===
Americans cling to the myth of individualism as though it were the only normal way to live, unaware that it was unknown in the Middle Ages (except for hermits) and would have been considered psychotic in Classical Greece.

— (p 108)

=== Gatsby and the American Dream ===
Jay Gatsby embodies the potential tragedy of success.

The son of shiftless and unsuccessful farm people of North Dakota, Jim Gatz reflected the American myth of Proteus... He believed he could recreate himself, deny his parentage and his roots and build a new identity.

— (p 129)

== Myths of the Western World ==
=== The Therapist and the Journey Into Hell ===
The author proposes that the relationship between Dante and Virgil, in the Divine Comedy, is analogous to the relationship between client and therapist in psychotherapy. The client's journey into self-knowledge is a journey into hell. Dante's masterpiece prefigures the process of psychotherapy. "A person's hell may consist of confronting the fact that his mother never loved him; or it may consist of fantasies of destroying those a person loves most, like Medea destroying her children" (p 155). The therapist's task is "to be guide, friend, and interpreter to persons on their journeys through their private hells and purgatories" (p 165). "Human beings can reach heaven only through hell. Without suffering—say as an author struggles to find the right word with which to communicate his meaning—or without a probing of one's fundamental aims, one cannot get to heaven." (p 166)

=== Peer Gynt: A Man's Problem in Loving ===
"Peer Gynt could be called the myth of males in the twentieth century, for it is a fascinating picture of the psychological patterns and conflicts of contemporary man." (p168) Peer Gynt is torn between two desires: "one desire is to be admired by women, and the other desire is to be taken care of by the same women." (p169)

"The reason Peer Gynt is a man for all nations is that the character and the myth are the product of Ibsen's profound self-knowledge" (p 170) "Running through Peer Gynt in the myth, and in Ibsen's drama, is the theme of the lost self and the arduous process of recovering it" (p 170)

Peer Gynt begins as a man who seduces women and then leaves them. He always avoids commitment. He escapes confronting himself by compulsive activity. Losing his delusions of self-importance throws him into despair. He sees that he is lonely. At first the increasing self-knowledge of his own emptiness leads to envy of the happiness of others. But his spitefulness eventually heals and becomes generosity.

He becomes able to commit to a relationship with Solvieg, who chooses him out of her personal integrity, whereas his mother "clung to him out of her deprivation".

"The ultimate meaning of this myth, even more true today than it was in Ibsen's day, is that all such narcissistic egocentricity leads to self-destruction." (p 190) "The renunciation of the narcissistic self is the beginning of authentic selfhood" (p 192) and the capacity to love.

== See also ==
- Thomas Mann, 1956, Joseph and his brothers, London, Secker & Warburg.
