= Friedrich Nietzsche's views on women =

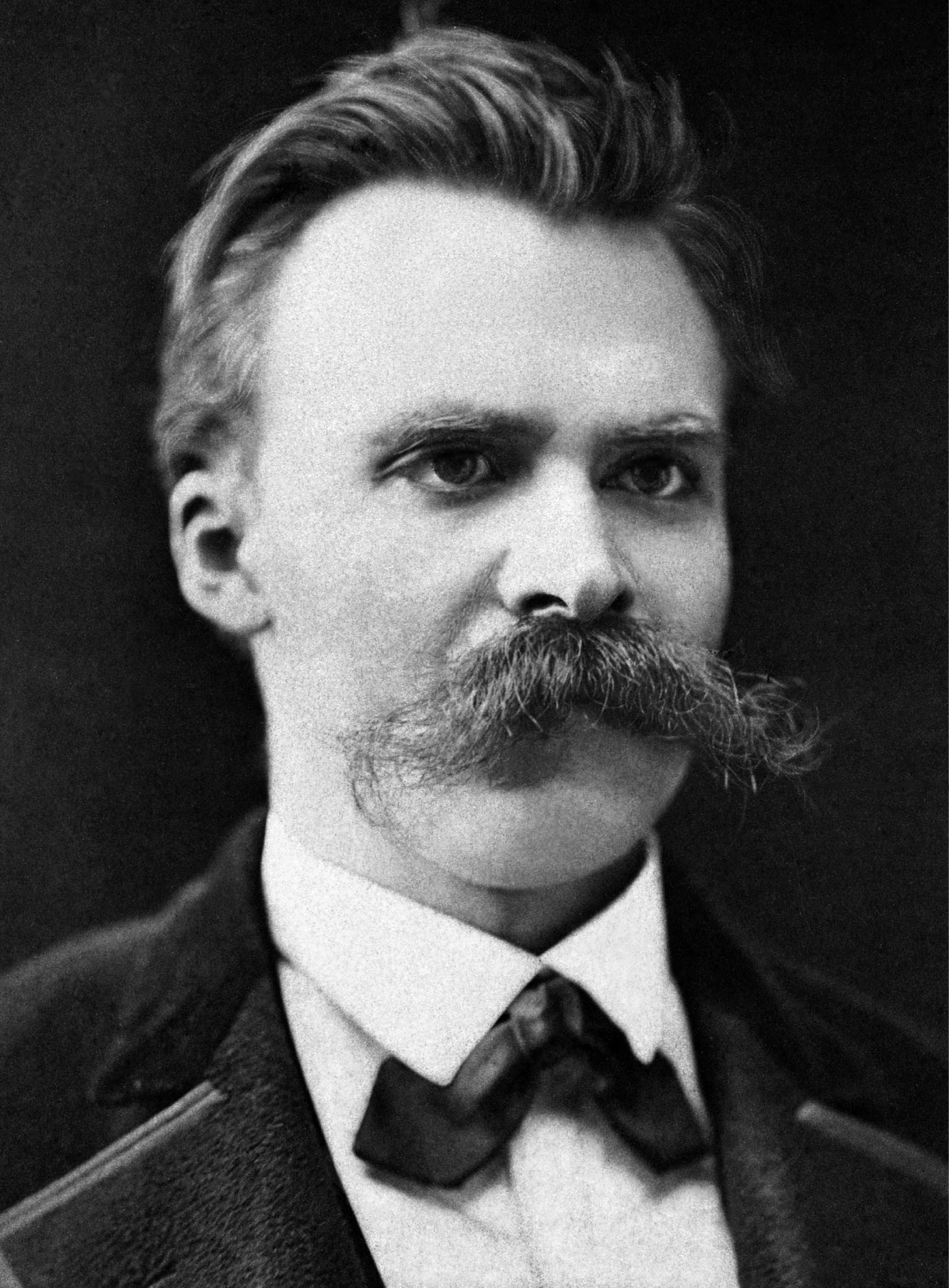
A photograph of Nietzsche taken c. 1875

Friedrich Nietzsche's views on women have attracted controversy, beginning during his life and continuing to the present.

As Leonard Lawlor and Zeynep Direk point out, "What Nietzsche says — and repeats with hysterical insistence — is that woman is the source of all folly and unreason, the siren figure who lures the male philosopher out of his appointed truth-seeking path."

Some recognize that Nietzsche made these remarks from a consciously relative position of his own perspective, and while they show little patience for his remarks overall, they recognize that however odious his individual opinion of women may have been, he was not advocating it as a model for others.

== Assessments by contemporaries ==
Ida von Miaskowski was the wife of the economist August von Miaskowski, who taught at the University of Basel. Between 1874 and 1876 Nietzsche had close relations with her family. In her memoir of Nietzsche, published seven years after his death, she remarked:

In the eighties, when Nietzsche's later writings containing some of the oft-quoted sharp words against women appeared, my husband sometimes told me jokingly not to tell people of my friendly relations with Nietzsche, since this was not very flattering for me. It was just a joke. My husband, like myself, always kept friendly memories of Nietzsche [···] his behavior precisely towards women was so sensitive, so natural and comradely, that even today in old age I cannot regard Nietzsche as a despiser of women.

Despite Nietzsche's writings being viewed as being misogynistic by many, others, such as Anthony Ludovici, insist that he is only an anti-feminist, not a misogynist.

=== Relationship with Salomé ===
Lou Andreas-Salomé, who knew Nietzsche very well, claimed that he had proposed to her (according to her, she refused him) and that there was something feminine in Nietzsche's "spiritual nature". According to her, Nietzsche considered genius to be a feminine genius.

== Philosophical influences ==
Scholars of Aristotle have drawn comparisons between Aristotle's views on women and those of Nietzsche. They have argued that Nietzsche may have borrowed much of his political philosophy from the latter.

== Apparent misogyny as rhetorical strategy ==
Frances Nesbitt Oppel interprets Nietzsche's attitude towards women as part of a rhetorical strategy.

...Nietzsche's apparent misogyny is part of his overall strategy to demonstrate that our attitudes toward sex-gender are thoroughly cultural, are often destructive of our own potential as individuals and as a species, and may be changed. What looks like misogyny may be understood as part of a larger strategy whereby "woman-as-such" (the universal essence of woman with timeless character traits) is shown to be a product of male desire, a construct.

Kathleen Merrow writes:

Nietzsche's metaphors of 'woman' — far from being misogynist — reveal a positive, affirmative 'woman.' His use of this metaphor radically dislocates traditional conceptions of the relationship masculine/feminine as it dislocates the 'truth' of metaphysics. I argue that the metaphor 'woman' is central to Nietzsche's attack on traditional philosophy and notions of truth.

Lawrence J. Hatab wrote:

If the "emancipation of women" means "equality", that is to say, affirming and recommending the participation of women in "man's world", it is clearly Nietzsche's view that this represents not a step up but in fact a regressive decline and loss of power. If feminine traits could be characterized as: playfulness, adornment, instinctiveness, unpredictability, sensuality, nurturing; and masculine traits, on the other hand, as: seriousness, rationality, orderliness, desensualization, a "career", then Nietzsche seems to be saying that the repudiation of feminine traits in favor of masculine traits is an exchange of strength for weakness.

=== Truly but self-critically misogynistic ===
Babette Babich takes up this same quote as below, recognizing that "[a]lthough Nietzsche as generously as ever saves his commentators the labor of interpretation, the problem recurs precisely because of the nature of what he proceeds to call his truths." But instead of focusing on putative misogyny she opines:

Much more [...] must be thought to affect everything Nietzsche writes about woman. Rather than mere psychological digs and constructions, rather than a simple expression of his own misogyny, Nietzsche's philosophic expression of the nature of woman reflects and repeats the possibilities of the affirmation or denial of illusion. This is Nietzsche's understanding of truth, and to this extent Nietzsche was able to exploit his own misogyny, in style, tracing the Platonic metaphor as such.

== Degree of importance ==
=== View that misogynistic statements are significant ===
Kelly Oliver and Marilyn Pearsall have even suggested that Nietzsche's philosophy and anthropology cannot be understood or analyzed apart from his remarks on women. They opine that, even though Nietzsche's work has been useful in the development of some feminist theory, it cannot be considered feminist per se: "While Nietzsche challenges traditional hierarchies between mind and body, reason and irrationality, nature and culture, truth and fiction — hierarchies that have been used to degrade and exclude women — his remarks about women and his use of feminine and maternal metaphors throughout his writings confound attempts simply to proclaim Nietzsche a champion of feminism or women."

=== Nietzsche's own caveating ===
Cornelia Klinger states in her book Continental Philosophy in Feminist Perspective: "Nietzsche, like Schopenhauer a prominent hater of women, at least relativizes his savage statements about woman-as-such." One of Nietzsche's own statements is cited in support of this assertion:

"Whenever a cardinal problem is at stake, there speaks an unchangeable "this is I"; about man and woman, for example, a thinker cannot relearn but only finish learning–only discover ultimately how this is "settled in him." At times we find certain solutions of problems that inspire strong faith in us; some call them henceforth their "convictions." Later–we see them only as steps to self-knowledge, signposts to the problem we are–rather, to the great stupidity we are, to our spiritual fatum, to what is unteachable very "deep down".

After this abundant civility that I have just evidenced in relation to myself I shall perhaps be permitted more readily to state a few truths about "woman as such"–assuming that it is now known from the outset how very much these are after all only–my truths." (Beyond Good and Evil, Section 231)

== Selected quotes ==
Nietzsche wrote specifically about his views on women in Section VII of Human, All Too Human, which seems to hold women in high regard; but given some of his other comments, his overall attitude towards women is ambivalent. For instance, while in Human, All Too Human, he states that "the perfect woman is a higher type of human than the perfect man, and also something much more rare, " there are a number of contradictions and subtleties in Nietzsche's thought elsewhere which are not easily reconcilable. At times he could speak both in praise and in contempt of women, as in the following passage: "What inspires respect for woman, and often enough even fear, is her nature, which is more “natural” than man's, the genuine, cunning suppleness of a beast of prey, the tiger's claw under the glove, the naiveté of her egoism, her uneducatability and inner wildness, the incomprehensibility, scope, and movement of her desires and virtues." (Beyond Good and Evil, section 239.)

His attitude can sometimes be entirely disparaging: "From the beginning, nothing has been more alien, repugnant, and hostile to woman than truth—her great art is the lie, her highest concern is mere appearance and beauty. " In section 6 in "Why I Write Such Excellent Books" of Ecce Homo, he claims that "goodness" in women is a sign of "physiological degeneration", and that women are on the whole cleverer and more wicked than men—which in Nietzsche's view, constitutes a compliment. Yet he goes on to claim that the feminist campaign for the emancipation of women was merely the resentment of some women against other women, who were physically better constituted and able to bear children.

Other writings include:

"Woman's love involves injustice and blindness against everything that she does not love... Woman is not yet capable of friendship: women are still cats and birds. Or at best cows... (Thus Spoke Zarathustra, On the Friend)

"Woman! One-half of mankind is weak, typically sick, changeable, inconstant... she needs a religion of weakness that glorifies being weak, loving, and being humble as divine: or better, she makes the strong weak—she rules when she succeeds in overcoming the strong... Woman has always conspired with the types of decadence, the priests, against the 'powerful', the 'strong', the men-" (The Will to Power - 864, Second German edition of 1906)
