= Love and Will =

1969 book by American existential psychologist Rollo May

- First edition
- Author: Rollo May
- Language: English
- Genre: Existential Psychology
- Publisher: W. W. Norton & Company
- Publication date: 1969
- Pages: 352
- ISBN: 978-0-393-33005-2

Love and Will (1969) is a book by American existential psychologist Rollo May, in which he articulates the principle that an awareness of death is essential to life, rather than being opposed to life.

The book explores how the modern loss of older values, whose structures and stories provided society with explanations of the mysteries of life, forces contemporary humanity to choose between finding meaning within themselves or deciding that neither oneself, nor life, has meaning. May argues that the core issue informing modern Western man's struggles is the failure to understand the significance, origin, and dynamic interrelationship between love and will.

== Love and Will in Our Modern World ==
The author proposes that love and will are interdependent processes that both influence and create new awareness within consciousness. Both involve the self-affirmation and self-assertion of the individual who allows themselves to affect, as well as be affected by, another. Their interrelated nature is emphasized by the fact that when they are not healthily and adaptively related to each other they can end up undermining each other's efficacious expression. While in the past they were consistently valued as the solution to life's problems, in our modern age of transition and uncertainty they have themselves become the most significant source of anxiety we must grapple with. (page 12)

=== The Age of Transition ===
"The old myths and symbols by which we oriented ourselves are gone, anxiety is rampant; we cling to each other and try to persuade ourselves that what we feel is love; we do not will because we are afraid that if we choose one thing or one person we'll lose the other, and we are too insecure to take that chance." (Page 14)

May argues that in the West people have become disoriented as a result of past traditions and external sources of meaning no longer adequately reconciling their inner experiences with the understanding or requirements of today's external world. As a result of this disequilibrium, people have had to turn inward to seek answers as to how they should live their lives more than ever before. The responsibility such self-exploration and uncertainty entails provokes a great deal of anxiety that the many experience as overwhelming. When individuals feel they cannot cope with this anxiety, they often compensate for it by cutting themselves off from their confusing feelings at the cost of both healthy growth and relatedness to others. The author refers to this orientation as a "Schizoid state" where one is at variance with their deepest drives. While other cultures encouraged such individuals to participate in constructive creative endeavors in order to reconcile with themselves through meaningfully exploring and expressing the various constituent elements of their person, Western culture instead encourages people to become apathetic and mechanistic in their orientation. This self-alienation and repression prevents the fulfillment of both our individual and collective potentials.

=== Care in Love and Will ===
"Care is a state in which something does matter; care is the opposite of apathy. Care is the necessary source of eros, the source of human tenderness." (page 289)

May proposes that eros begins physiologically, with care being its psychological component. He states that the human capacity for care is predicated on our ability to feel pain. Quoting the philosopher Martin Heidegger, he explains that "Conscience is the call of Care," and "manifests itself as care." Our awareness of ourselves as human beings and our capacities to relate meaningfully is informed by our finite natures. Care is described as relational, where an individual is required to orient themselves towards the external other in a significant manner. May argues that Care is the necessary antidote for the apathy, disengagement, and desire for external stimulants symptomatic of a nihilistic sense of meaninglessness that he believed Western society faces.

=== Creating of Consciousness ===
"Contrary to the usual assumption, we all begin life not as individuals, but as 'we'; we are created by the union of male and female, literally of one flesh, produced by the semen of the father fertilizing the egg of the mother. Individuality emerges within this original "we," and by virtue of this 'we.'" (page 316)

The author compares the creation of new consciousness and gradual actualization of individuality to the Biblical story of the Fall in the Garden of Eden.

=== Reconciling Love and Will ===
May asserts that the ultimate solution to such fundamental concerns is to deepen our relationship with the various elements of our beings, to resolve the alienation between our innate drives and conscious wills, and in the process deepen our intimacy with others.

=== Definitions of Love ===
In this work, May identifies and defines five types of love:

- Libido : A biological drive satisfied via sexual intercourse or some other release of sexual tension.
- Eros : A psychological desire that seeks after an enduring union with a loved one leading to new creation. Drives individuals towards higher forms of being and deeper relationships. Begins physiologically but deepens psychologically as a result of caring for the other.
- Philia : The non-sexual intimate friendship between two people.
- Agape: Esteem for the other, the concern for the other's welfare beyond self-interest, dispassionate or disinterested love. Usually considered to be the love of God for man.
- Manic : Impulsive, emotionally driven love. Feelings fluctuate between hot and cold. Involves polarized, oscillating perceptions of the other.

== Reception ==
Love and Will went on to become Rollo May's most popular work, becoming a best-seller and being awarded with the Ralph Waldo Emerson Award for humane scholarship in 1970.

== See also ==
- Eros
- Daimonic
- Existential Psychotherapy
