= George Pirkhamer =

German theologian

George Pirkhamer (also Georg Pirkhamer or Jörg Pirkhamer) was a Roman Catholic theologian and prior at Nuremberg, Germany in the 15th century.
