= George Egerton =

Irish writer and feminist (1859–1945)

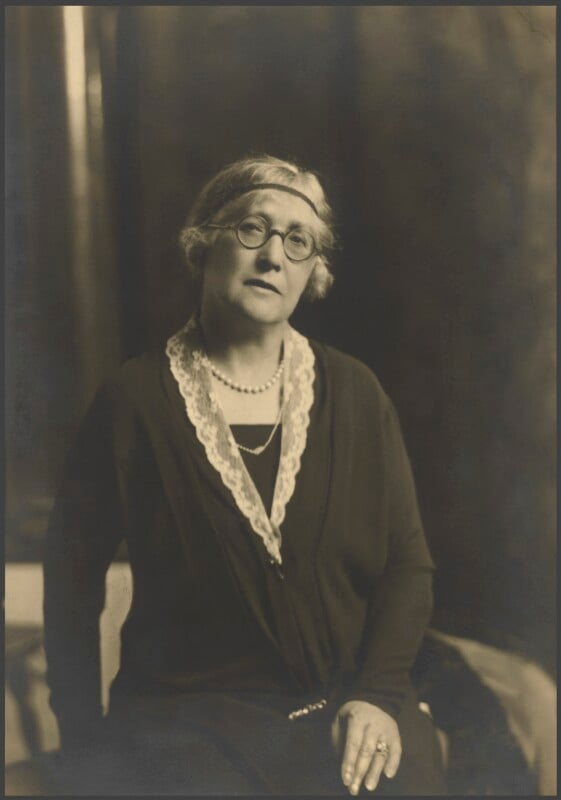
- Egerton c. 1930–36
- Born: Mary Elizabeth Annie Dunne; 14 December 1859; Melbourne, Colony of Victoria
- Died: 12 August 1945 (aged 85); Crawley, Sussex, England
- Occupation: Writer
- Spouses: Henry Peter Higginson (m. 1888; died 1889); Egerton Tertius Clairmonte (m. 1891; div. 1901); Reginald Golding Bright (m. 1901; died 1941)
- Children: 1

Mary Chavelita Dunne Bright (née Mary Chavelita Dunne, formerly Higginson and Clairmonte; 14 December 1859 – 12 August 1945), better known by her pen name George Egerton (pronounced Edg'er-ton), was an Irish writer of short stories, novels, plays and translations, noted for her psychological probing, innovative narrative techniques, and outspokenness about women's need for freedom, including sexual freedom. Egerton is widely considered to be one of the most important writers in the late nineteenth century New Woman movement, and a key exponent of early modernism in English-language literature. Egerton referred to herself throughout her life as "intensely Irish".

== Early life ==
Egerton was born Mary Chavelita Dunne in 4 December 1859 at a British Army base in Melbourne, Colony of Victoria to Captain John Joseph Dunne (1837–1910), an Irish Catholic army officer, writer and member of the Home Rule movement, and Isabel Dunne (née George-Bynon; 1833–1875), a Welsh Protestant. (Note: Egerton's mother is also cited as Elizabeth Dunne.) The eldest of six siblings, Egerton was raised in a Catholic household. (Note: Also cited as being eldest of five siblings.)

The family lived in Australia, New Zealand and Chile before returning to Dublin when Egerton was 11 years old. In Ireland, Egerton was educated at a private Catholic school. Following the death of her mother in 1875, Egerton was sent to school in Germany. Returning to Ireland in 1877 to care for her younger brothers and sisters, Egerton later trained as a nurse in London.

In 1884, Egerton went to America in order to find work. Egerton spent two years in New York in an abortive attempt to earn money to support her father, brothers and sisters. Failing at this endeavour (though some of her experiences in the USA would serve as inspiration for her 1898 novel The Wheel of God), she returned to live in England.

== Literary career ==
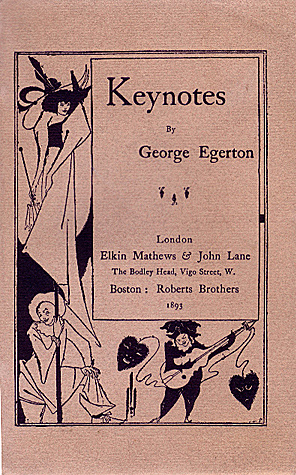
Cover of Keynotes

Egerton's first book of short stories, Keynotes, was published by John Lane and Elkin Mathews of the Bodley Head in 1893 and illustrated by Aubrey Beardsley. Like other Bodley Head and Beardsley-illustrated publications, it is associated with both the literary fin de siècle and "Decadent" movements. Keynotes was phenomenally successful (and notorious) on both sides of the Atlantic and as a result of this Egerton became a celebrity, was interviewed in the leading magazines of the day, and was famously lampooned in Punch.

Keynotes and her subsequent fiction often had the same thematic preoccupation: a dismissal of female purity as a male construct that denies women the right to expect and experience sexual freedom and fulfilment. Commentators long felt that Keynotes was the high-water mark of Egerton's literary career, but a renewed interest in her later work gained momentum in the first decade of the twenty-first century and has continued apace. As a result, recent academic scholarship has increasingly focused on her subsequent volume of short stories, Discords, and her later efforts – including two additional short story volumes (Symphonies and Flies in Amber); two novels (Rosa Amorosa and The Wheel of God); and a book of Nietzschean parables (Fantasias). Her later incarnation as a playwright (Camilla States Her Case, 1925) and translator of plays (most notably from the French) generated only a few moderately successful productions. She was a friend of George Bernard Shaw, Ellen Terry and J. M. Barrie.

=== Politics ===
Egerton's work is among the most forthrightly outspoken in nineteenth-century and early twentieth-century English-language literature in terms of a demand for women's education, financial independence, and sexual freedom. Yet, while she was firmly associated with the New Woman movement, Egerton claimed to be "embarrassed" by this reduction of her work. Interestingly, like Emily Lawless, Egerton was one of the major feminist writers of the period who chose to distance herself from the women's suffrage movement, although in her private letters she could be forthrightly pro-suffrage. For instance, she wrote in a letter to her father in 1908: 'H. Gladstone that mediocre son of an overrated father is a feeble thing at the head of any department. The women won't be beaten in the long run. -- In every class they have a greater average of intelligence than the men...It isn't a question of Rights. It is a question of Economic change. A Surplus population of women who must work, outside home life...means: if I pay the tax—I must get the vote!'

Some critics see an anti-authoritarian impulse in her work. Her feminism can be read as a difference feminism, or as an individualist feminism. Egerton's short stories are typically critical of organised religion, and include many discussions of atheism. She was scathing of marriage as an institution, and many of her protagonists overtly defy Victorian and Christian morality by advocating free unions, same sex parenting partnerships and single parenthood.

=== Reputation ===
Egerton's stylistic innovations and her often radical and feminist subject matter have ensured that her fiction continues to generate academic interest in America and Britain. Thomas Hardy acknowledged the influence of Egerton's work on his own, in particular on the construction of his "New Woman" character, Sue Bridehead, in Jude the Obscure, and Tina O'Toole has described New Woman writers in general, and Egerton in particular, as the "missing link" to the sexually transgressive work of later writers such as Kate O'Brien (novelist). Holbrook Jackson credited Egerton with the first mention of Friedrich Nietzsche in English literature (she refers to Nietzsche in Keynotes in 1893, three years before the first of Nietzsche's works was translated into English). Her experimentation with form and content has also been described as anticipating the modernism of writers like Virginia Woolf, James Joyce, Jean Rhys, and D. H. Lawrence, and her 1898 novel The Wheel of God, in particular, has been posited as a rudimentary template for James Joyce's A Portrait of the Artist as a Young Man and as a potential influence on segments of Ulysses.

== Personal life ==
In 1888, in events which were notorious enough to be widely published in leading newspapers in the UK and Ireland, Egerton eloped with the then-married Henry Peter Higginson-Whyte-Melville (born Henry Peter Higginson). In retaliation, Whyte-Melville's wife accused her estranged husband of being a bigamist, claiming he was already married at the time that she wed him. This allegation was later proved to be untrue. During the period of the elopement, Egerton's father pursued the couple and, newspaper reports confirm, shot at Whyte-Melville in a hansom cab. Whyte-Melville was divorced later that year and he and Egerton married in Detroit in the summer of 1888. The marriage lasted until his death a year later.

With Whyte-Melville, Egerton moved to Norway, where she lived for two years. This time spent in Norway was formative to her in terms of her intellectual growth and artistic development. While in Norway she immersed herself in the work of Henrik Ibsen, August Strindberg, Ola Hansson, Friedrich Nietzsche, and Knut Hamsun. Her brief romantic connection to Hamsun served as the inspiration for her 1893 short story "Now Spring Has Come". Hamsun went on to win the Nobel Prize for Literature, and Egerton was the first to make Hamsun's work accessible to an English readership, with her translation of his first novel Hunger (Sult), published in 1899. A second marriage (in 1891) to the minor adventurer and author Egerton Tertius Clairmonte was the impetus for her first attempts at writing fiction – instigated by his penniless status and her desire to alleviate the boredom she felt upon her return to rural Ireland. She chose the pseudonym "George Egerton" as a tribute to both her mother and to Clairmonte. Asked how to say her pen name, she told The Literary Digest it was pronounced edg'er-ton, adding "This name is pronounced this way, as far as I know by all bearers of the name in England."

On 12 August 1945, Egerton died at a nursing home in Crawley, Sussex aged 85.

== List of works ==
- Keynotes. London: Elkin Mathews and John Lane, 1893. https://archive.org/details/b29012612/page/n5 (short story collection)

Includes "A Cross Line"

- Discords. London: John Lane at The Bodley Head, 1894. https://archive.org/details/discordsbygeorg00egergoog/page/n8
- "A Lost Masterpiece." The Yellow Book Vol. 1 (April 1894): 189–96. https://archive.org/details/yellowapril189401uoft/page/n205
- "The Captain's Book." The Yellow Book Vol. 6 (July 1895): 103–16. https://archive.org/details/in.ernet.dli.2015.41184/page/n115
- Symphonies. London: John Lane at The Bodley Head, 1897. https://archive.org/details/symphonies00egergoog/page/n4
- Fantasias. London: John Lane at The Bodley Head, 1898. https://archive.org/details/in.ernet.dli.2015.45969/page/n5
- The Wheel of God. London: Grant Richards, 1898. https://archive.org/details/wheelgod00egergoog/page/n11
- Rosa Amorosa: The Love-Letters of a Woman. London: Grant Richards, 1901. https://archive.org/details/cu31924013248129
- Flies in Amber. London: Hutchinson, 1905.
- "A Keynote to Keynotes." Ten Contemporaries: Notes Toward Their Definitive Bibliography. Ed. John Gawsworth. London: Ernest Benn, 1932.
- A Leaf from The Yellow Book: The Correspondence of George Egerton. Ed. Terence de Vere White. London: Richards, 1958.

Translations and adaptations

- Ola Hansson: Young Ofeg's Ditties. London: J. Lane, 1895. https://archive.org/details/youngofegsdittie00hansiala/page/n5/mode/2up
- Knut Hamsun: Hunger. London: L. Smithers, 1899. https://archive.org/details/hunger00egergoog/page/n9/mode/2up
- Henri Bernstein: The Whirlwind (1910)
- Henri Bernstein: The Attack (1912)
- Pierre Loti and Judith Gautier: The Daughter of Heaven (1912)

Plays

- His Wife’s Family (1907)
- Backsliders (1910)
- Camilla States Her Case (1925)
