= Cosas de la vida =

Cosas de la vida may refer to:

- "Cosas de la vida" (song), the Spanish-language release of the 1993 song "Cose della vita" by Eros Ramazzotti
- Cosas de la vida (TV series), a 2008-2009 Disney Channel Spain series featuring Andreas Muñoz and Ana Mulvoy-Ten
