= Ignatius of Loyola =

Basque Spaniard Catholic priest, theologian and saint (1491–1556)

Saint Ignatius of Loyola SJ
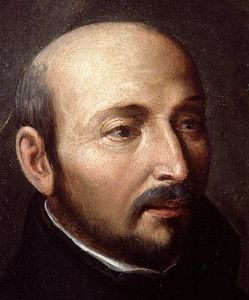
- Ignatius of Loyola (c. 16th-century portrait)

Priest, Founder of the Jesuit Order
- Born: Iñigo López de Oñaz y Loyola; 23 October 1491; Azpeitia, Gipuzkoa, Crown of Castile
- Died: 31 July 1556 (aged 64); Rome, Papal States
- Venerated in: Catholic Church; Anglican Communion
- Beatified: 27 July 1609, Rome, Papal States, by Pope Paul V
- Canonized: 12 March 1622, Rome, Papal States, by Pope Gregory XV
- Major shrine: Church of the Gesù Rome, Italy
- Feast: 31 July
- Attributes: Sacerdotal vestments; cassock; ferraiolo; biretta; holding a book with Ad maiorem Dei gloriam inscription; trampling on a heretic; IHS Christogram; crucifix; rosary
- Patronage: Society of Jesus; soldiers; spiritual retreats; Biscay; Gipuzkoa; Ateneo De Manila University; the Archdiocese of Baltimore, Maryland; the Diocese of Antwerp, Belgium; Belo Horizonte, Brazil; Junín, Buenos Aires, Argentina; Rome, Italy; Military Ordinariate of the Philippines; Military Ordinariate of Brazil; Military Ordinariate of Korea; accidents and injuries.
- Influences: Francis of Assisi; Ludolph of Saxony; Thomas à Kempis
- Major works: Spiritual Exercises

Ignatius of Loyola (Note: /ɪɡˈneɪʃəs/ ig-NAY-shəs; Basque: Ignazio Loiolakoa; Spanish: Ignacio de Loyola; Latin: Ignatius de Loyola) (born Íñigo López de Oñaz y Loyola; c. 23 October 1491 – 31 July 1556) was a Spanish Catholic priest and theologian, who, with six companions, founded the religious order of the Society of Jesus (Jesuits), and became its first Superior General, in Paris in 1541.

Ignatius envisioned the purpose of the Society of Jesus to be missionary work and teaching. In addition to the vows of chastity, obedience and poverty of other religious orders in the church, Loyola instituted a fourth vow for Jesuits of obedience to the Pope, to engage in projects ordained by the pontiff. Jesuits were instrumental in leading the Counter-Reformation.

As a former soldier, Ignatius paid particular attention to the spiritual formation of his recruits and recorded his method in the Spiritual Exercises (1548). In time, the method has become known as Ignatian spirituality. He was beatified in 1609 and was canonized as a saint on 12 March 1622. His feast day is celebrated on 31 July. He is the patron saint of the Basque provinces of Gipuzkoa and Biscay as well as of the Society of Jesus. He was declared the patron saint of all spiritual retreats by Pope Pius XI in 1922.

== Early life ==
Ignatius of Loyola was born Iñigo López de Oñaz y Loyola in the castle at Loyola, in the municipality of Azpeitia, Gipuzkoa, in the Basque entities of the Crown of Castile. His parents, Don Beltrán Ibáñez de Oñaz y Loyola and Doña María (or Marina) Sáenz de Licona y Balda, who were of the minor nobility, from the clan of Loyola, were involved in the Basque war of the bands. Their manor house was demolished on the orders of the King of Castile in 1456 for their depredations in Gipuzkoa, with Iñigo's paternal grandfather being expelled to Andalusia by Henry IV. Íñigo was the youngest of their thirteen children with seven brothers and five sisters. Their eldest son, Juan Pérez, had soldiered in forces commanded by Gonzalo Fernández de Córdoba, but died fighting in the Italian Wars (1494–1559).

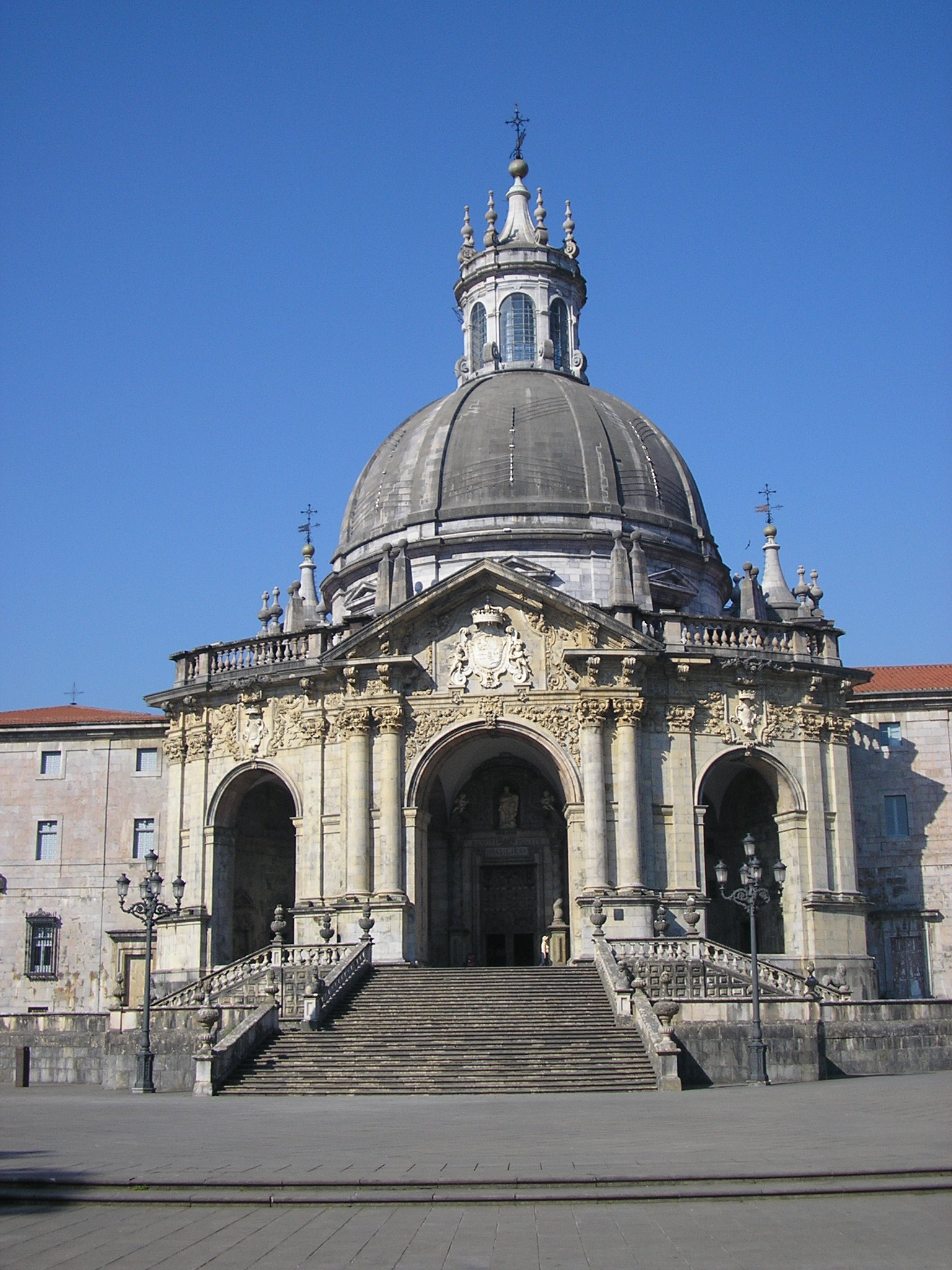
The Sanctuary of Loyola, in Azpeitia, built atop the birthplace of the saint

He was baptized "Íñigo" on honour of Íñigo of Oña, Abbot of Oña; the name also is a medieval Basque diminutive for "My little one". It is not clear when he began using the Latin name "Ignatius" instead of his baptismal name "Íñigo". Historian Gabriel María Verd says that Íñigo did not intend to change his name, but rather adopted a name which he believed was a simple variant of his own, for use in France and Italy where it was better understood. Íñigo adopted the surname "de Loyola" in reference to the Basque village of Loyola where he was born.

Soon after the birth of Íñigo, his mother died. Maternal care fell to María de Garín, the wife of the local blacksmith. In 1498, his second eldest brother, Martin, heir to the estate, took his new wife to live in the castle, and she became mistress of the household. Later, the seven-year-old boy Íñigo returned to Casa Loyola. Anticipating his possible ecclesiastic career, Don Beltrán had Íñigo tonsured.

=== Military career ===
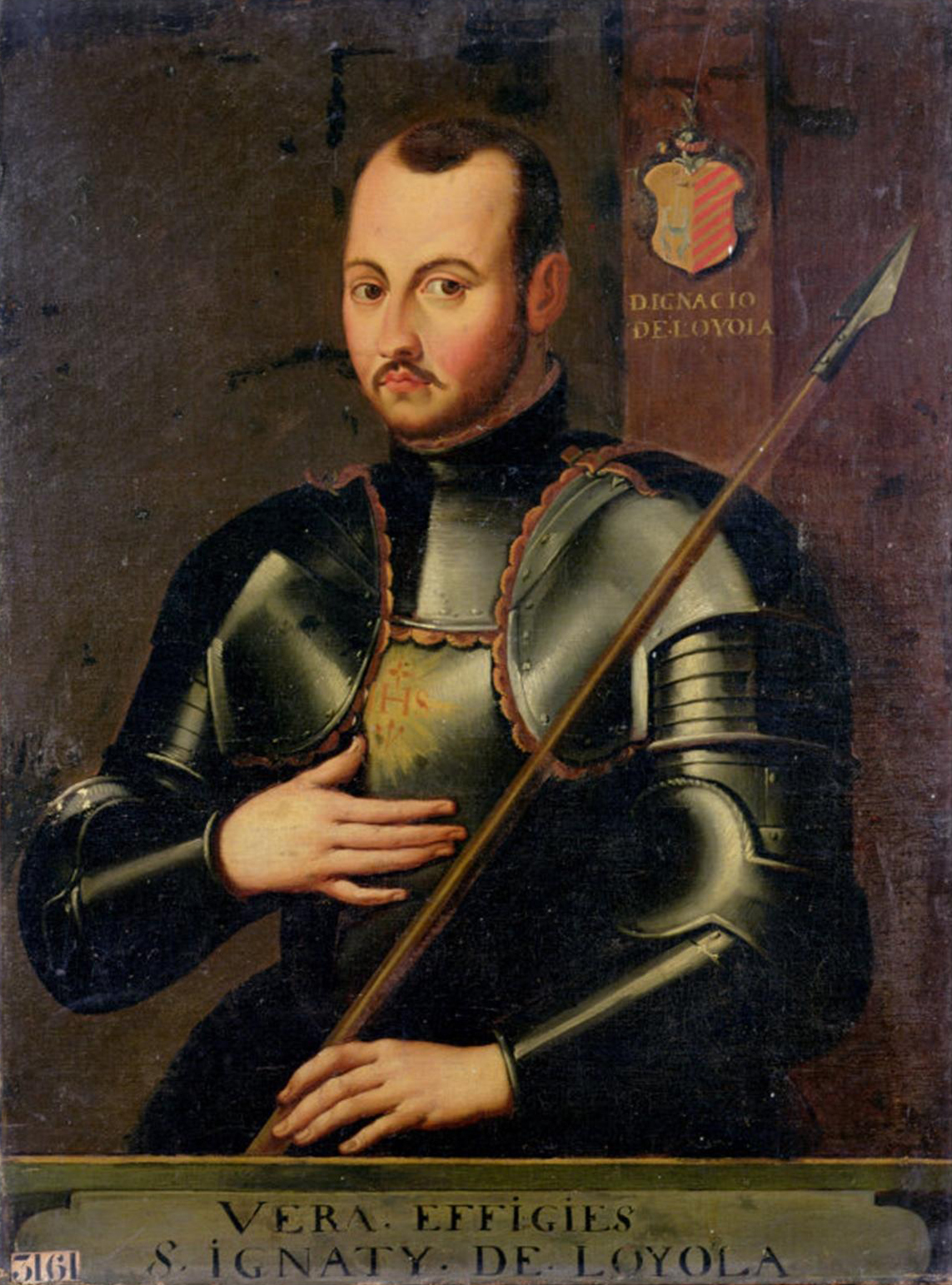
Ignatius in his armour, in a 16th-century painting

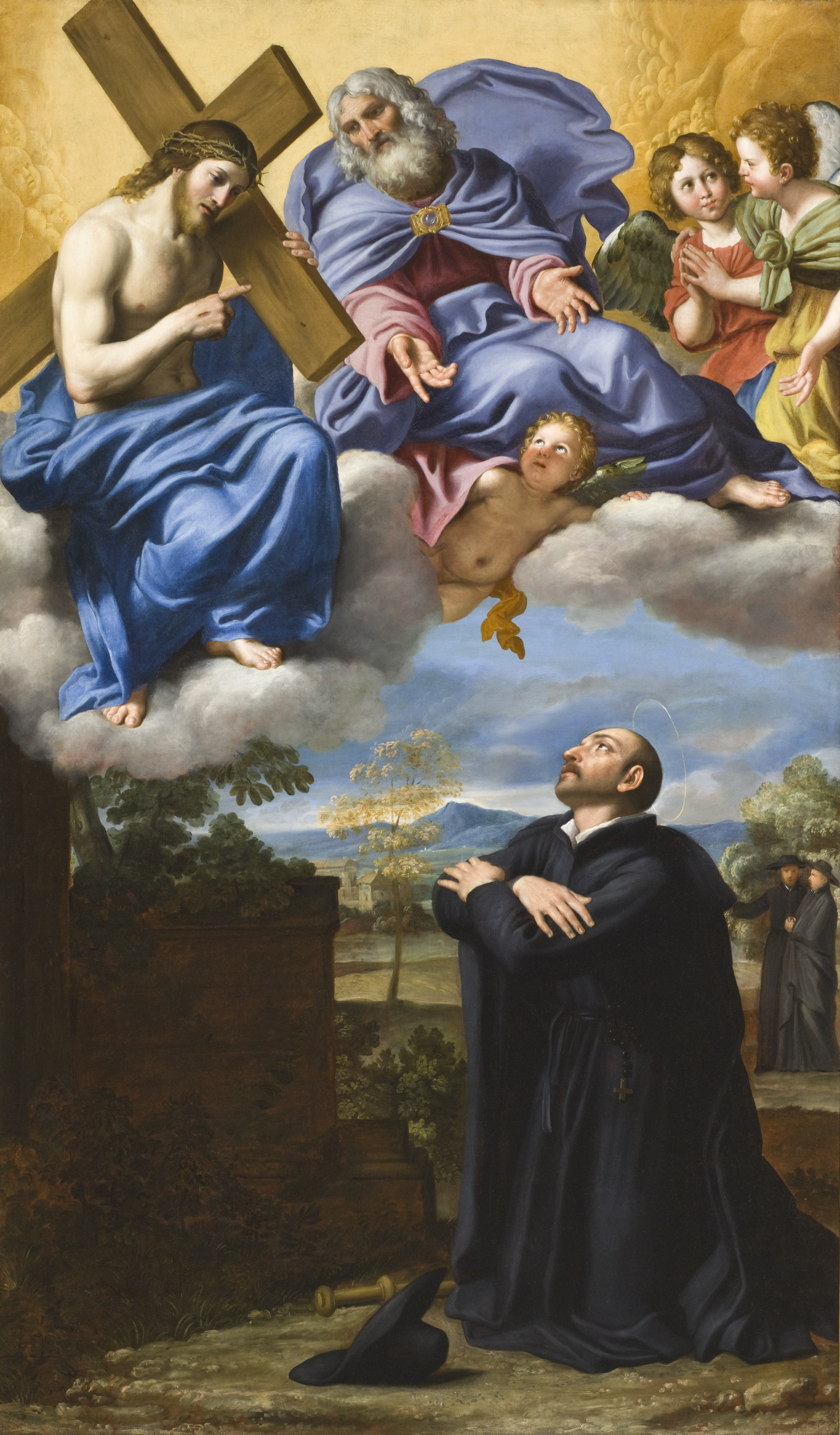
Saint Ignatius of Loyola's Vision of Christ and God the Father at La Storta by Domenichino

Instead, Íñigo became a page in the service of a relative, Juan Velázquez de Cuéllar, treasurer (contador mayor) of the kingdom of Castile. During his time in the household of Don Velázquez, Íñigo took up dancing, fencing, gambling, the pursuit of the young ladies, and duelling. Íñigo, by his own admission, was keen on military exercises and was driven by a desire for fame, and patterned his life after stories of knights and chivalry, such as Amadís de Gaula.

He joined the army at seventeen, and according to one biographer, he strutted about "with his cape flying open to reveal his tight-fitting hose and boots; a sword and dagger at his waist". According to another he was "a fancy dresser, an expert dancer, a womanizer, sensitive to insult, and a rough punkish swordsman who used his privileged status to escape prosecution for violent crimes committed with his priest brother at carnival time."

In 1509, aged 18, Íñigo took up arms for Antonio Manrique de Lara, 2nd Duke of Nájera. His diplomacy and leadership qualities earned him the title "servant of the court", and made him very useful to the Duke. Under the Duke's leadership, Íñigo participated in many battles without injury. However at the Battle of Pamplona on 20 May 1521 he was gravely injured when a French-Navarrese expedition force stormed the fortress of Pamplona, and a cannonball ricocheting off a nearby wall fractured his right leg. Íñigo was returned to his father's castle in Loyola, where, in an era before anesthetics, he underwent several surgical operations to repair the leg, with his bones set and rebroken. In the end, the operations left his right leg shorter than the other. He would limp for the rest of his life, with his military career over.

=== Religious conversion and visions ===
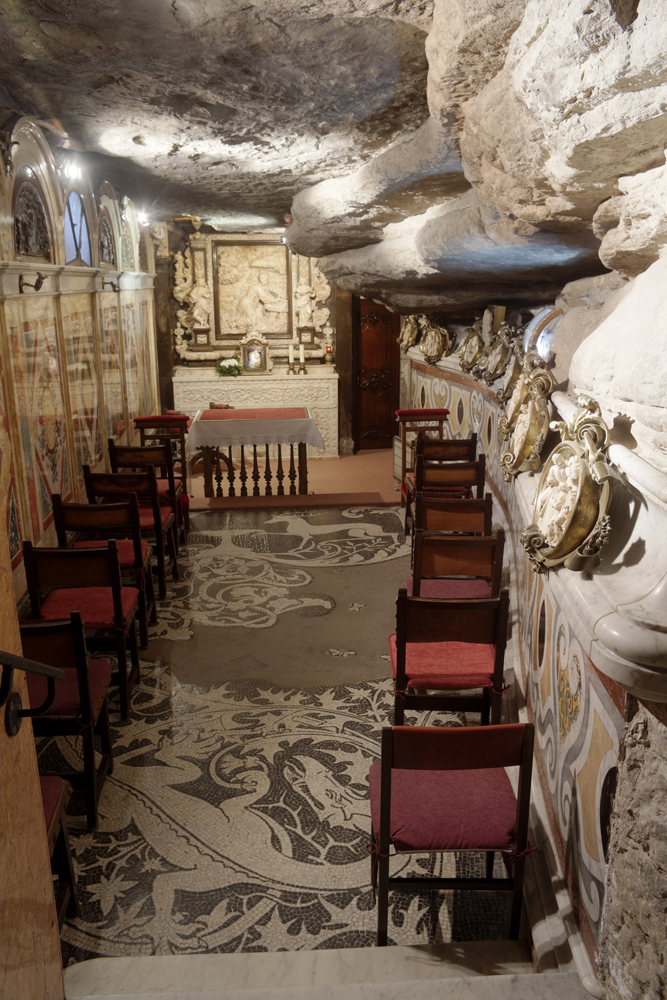
Manresa, Chapel in the Cave of Saint Ignatius where Ignatius practiced asceticism and conceived his Spiritual Exercises

While recovering from surgery, Íñigo underwent a spiritual conversion and discerned a call to the religious life. In order to divert the weary hours of convalescence, he asked for the romances of chivalry, his favourite reading, but there were none in the castle, and instead, his beloved sister-in-law, Magdalena de Araoz brought him the lives of Christ and of the saints.

The religious work which most particularly struck him was the De Vita Christi of Ludolph of Saxony. This book would influence his whole life, inspiring him to devote himself to God and follow the example of Francis of Assisi and other great monks. It also inspired his method of meditation, since Ludolph proposes that the reader place himself mentally at the scene of the Gospel story, visualising the crib at the Nativity, etc. This type of meditation, known as Simple Contemplation, was the basis for the method that Ignatius outlined in his Spiritual Exercises.

Aside from dreaming about imitating the saints in his readings, Íñigo was still wandering off in his mind about what "he would do in service to his king and in honour of the royal lady he was in love with". Cautiously he came to realize the after-effects of both kinds of his dreams. He experienced desolation and dissatisfaction when the romantic heroism dream was over, but, the saintly dream ended with much joy and peace. It was the first time he learned about discernment.

After he had recovered sufficiently to walk again, Íñigo resolved to begin a pilgrimage to the Holy Land to "kiss the earth where our Lord had walked", and to do stricter penances. He thought that his plan was confirmed by a vision of the Virgin Mary and the infant Jesus he experienced one night, which resulted in much consolation to him. In March 1522, he visited the Benedictine monastery of Santa Maria de Montserrat. There, he carefully examined his past sins, confessed, gave his fine clothes to the poor he met, wore a "garment of sack-cloth", then hung his sword and dagger at the Virgin's altar during an overnight vigil at the shrine.

From Montserrat he walked on to the nearby town of Manresa (Catalonia), where he lived for about a year, begging for his keep, and then eventually doing chores at a local hospital in exchange for food and lodging. For several months he spent much of his time praying in a cave nearby where he practised rigorous asceticism, praying for seven hours a day, and formulating the fundamentals of his Spiritual Exercises.

Íñigo also experienced a series of visions in full daylight while at the hospital. These repeated visions appeared as "a form in the air near him and this form gave him much consolation because it was exceedingly beautiful ... it somehow seemed to have the shape of a serpent and had many things that shone like eyes, but were not eyes. He received much delight and consolation from gazing upon this object ... but when the object vanished he became disconsolate". He came to interpret this vision as diabolical in nature.

== Period of studies ==
In September 1523, Íñigo made a pilgrimage to the Holy Land with the aim of settling there. He remained there from the 3^{rd} to 23^{rd} of September but was sent back to Europe by the Franciscans.

He returned to Barcelona and at the age of 33 and attended a free public grammar school in preparation for university entrance. He went on to the University of Alcalá, where he studied theology and Latin from 1526 to 1527.

There he encountered a number of devout women who had been called before the Inquisition. These women were considered alumbrados – a group linked in their zeal and spirituality to Franciscan reforms, but they had incurred mounting suspicion from the administrators of the Inquisition. Once when Íñigo was preaching on the street, three of these devout women began to experience ecstatic states. "One fell senseless, another sometimes rolled about on the ground, another had been seen in the grip of convulsions or shuddering and sweating in anguish." The suspicious activity took place while Íñigo had preached without a degree in theology. As a result, he was singled out for interrogation by the Inquisition but was later released.

Following these risky activities, Íñigo (by this time, he had changed his name to Ignatius, probably to make it more acceptable to other Europeans) adopted the surname "de Loyola" in reference to the Basque village of Loyola where he was born. Ignatius moved to France to study at the University of Paris. He attended first the ascetic Collège de Montaigu, moving on to the Collège Sainte-Barbe to study for a master's degree.

He arrived in France at a time of anti-Protestant turmoil which had forced John Calvin to flee France. Very soon after, Ignatius had gathered around him six companions, all of them fellow students at the university. They were the Spaniards Alfonso Salmeron, Diego Laynez, Francis Xavier and Nicholas Bobadilla, with the Portuguese Simão Rodrigues and Peter Faber, a Savoyard, the latter two becoming his first companions, and his closest associates in the foundation of the future Jesuit order.

"On the morning of the 15th of August, 1534, in the chapel of the Martyrium of Saint Denis, in Montmartre, Loyola and his six companions, of whom only one was a priest, met and took upon themselves the solemn vows of their lifelong work."

Ignatius gained a Magisterium from the University of Paris at the age of forty-three in 1535. In later life, he would often be called "Master Ignatius" because of this.

== Foundation of the Jesuit order ==
In 1539, with Peter Faber and Francis Xavier, Ignatius formed the Society of Jesus, which was approved in 1540 by Pope Paul III. He was chosen as the first Superior General of the order and invested with the title of "Father General" by the Jesuits.

Ignatius sent his companions on missions across Europe to create schools, colleges, and seminaries. Juan de Vega, then ambassador of Charles V, Holy Roman Emperor in Rome, met Ignatius there and having formed a good impression of the Jesuits, invited them to travel with him to his new appointment as Viceroy of Sicily. As a result, a Jesuit college was opened in Messina, which proved a success, so that its rules and methods were later copied in subsequent colleges. In a letter to Francis Xavier before his departure to India in 1541, Ignatius famously used the Latin phrase "Ite, inflammate omnia", meaning, "Go, set the world on fire", a phrase used in the Jesuit order to this day.

With the assistance of his secretary, Juan Alfonso de Polanco, Ignatius wrote the Jesuit Constitutions, which were adopted in 1553. They created a centralised organisation of the order, and stressed absolute self-denial and obedience to the Pope and to superiors in the Church hierarchy. This was summarised in the motto perinde ac cadaver – "as if a dead body", meaning that a Jesuit should be as empty of ego as is a corpse. However the overarching Jesuit principle became: Ad maiorem Dei gloriam ("for the greater glory of God").

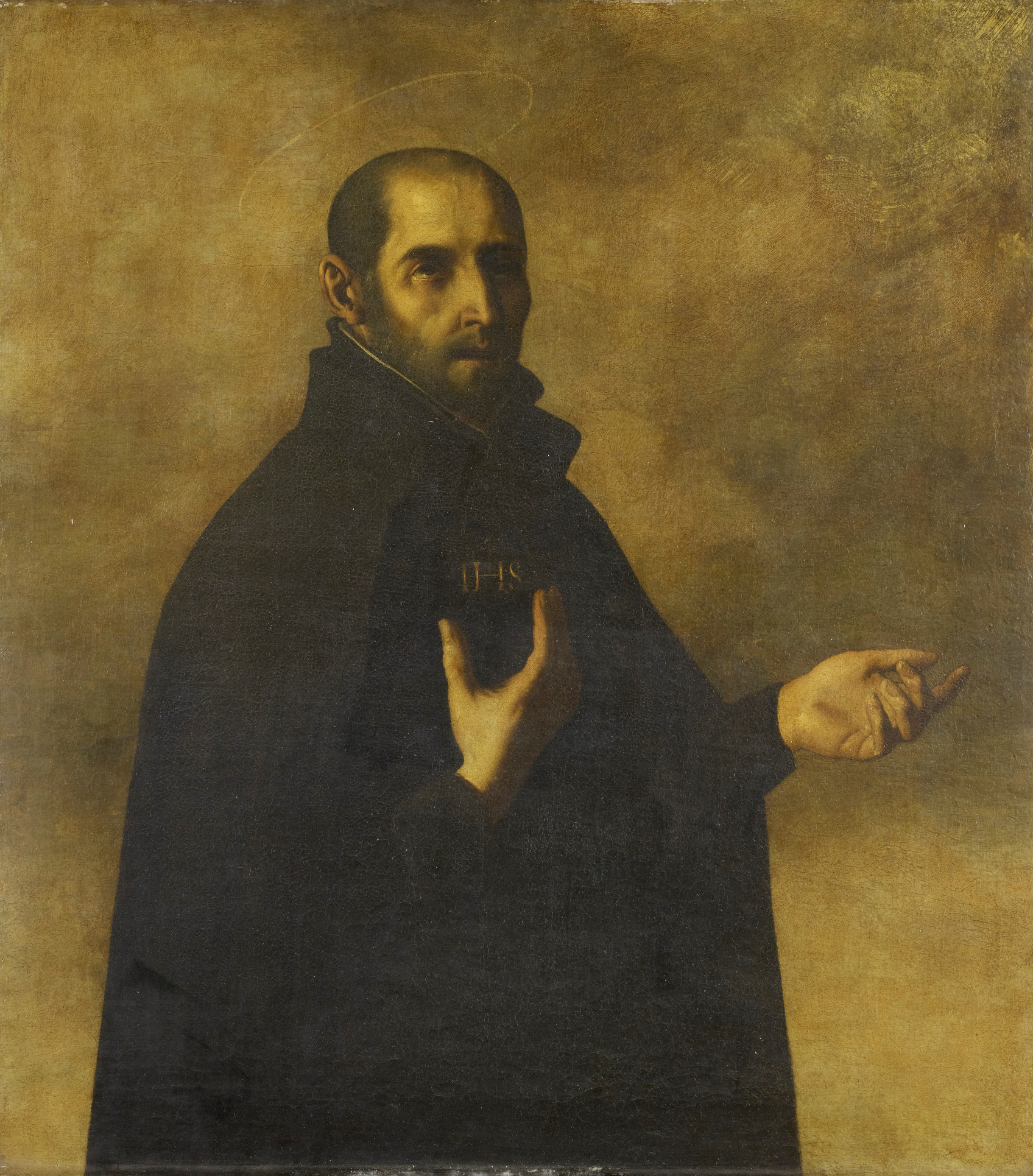
Ignatius as Superior General

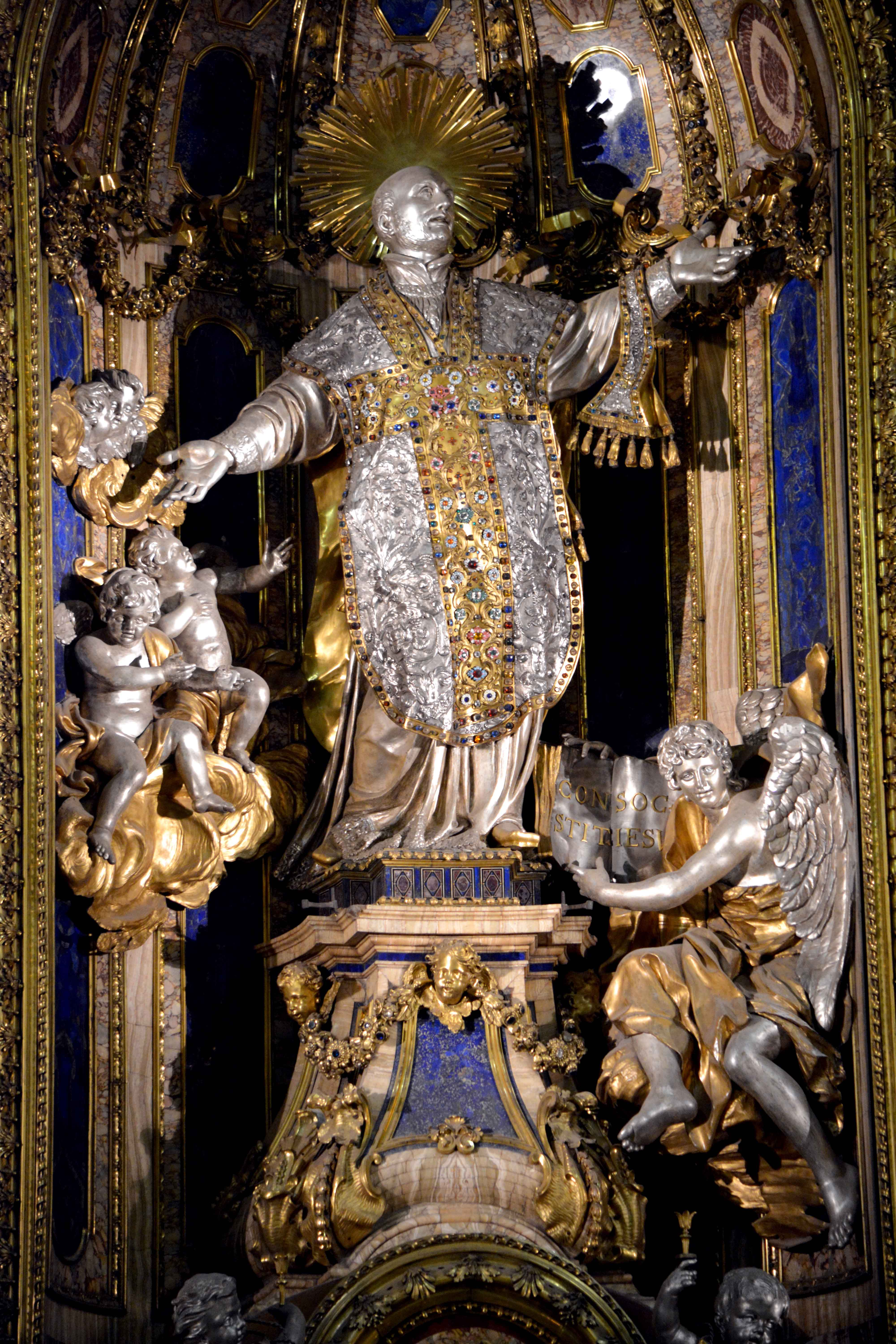
Statue of Saint Ignatius in the Church of the Gesù, Rome

== Death and canonization ==
By 1553 Ignatius' health had begun to fail, and he decided to dictate a testament of his life to a Jesuit named Louis Gonzalez. The work was later published as an autobiography in 1555. It recounts Ignatius' life during the 1520s and 1530s, starting with his convalescence and religious conversion.

Ignatius died in Rome on the 31 of July 1556, probably of the "Roman Fever", a severe variant of malaria which was endemic in Rome throughout medieval history. An autopsy revealed that he also had kidney and bladder stones, a probable cause of the abdominal pains he suffered from in later life.

The anatomist Matteo Colombo was present at the necropsy of St. Ignatius. He describes the results in his De re anatomica libre XV:

I have taken out innumerable stones with my own hands, with various colors found in the kidneys, in the lungs, in the liver, and in the portal vein. For I saw stones in the ureters, in the bladder, in the colon, in the hemorrhoidal veins as well as in the umbilicus. Also in the gall bladder I found stones of various shapes and colors.

— Matthew Colombo, De re anatomica libre XV

From the facts presented, the exact cause of death cannot be established. The stones mentioned in the kidneys, ureters, urinary bladder and gall bladder appear to indicate nephrolithiasis and cholelithiasis. The so-called stones in the veins appear to be thrombosed haemorrhoids. Those mentioned in the colon, liver, and lungs suggest the possibility of a malignant gastro-intestinal growth with metastases to the liver and lungs. Because of the inadequacy of the protocols of the sixteenth century, the exact final anatomical diagnosis on the autopsy of Ignatius cannot be established beyond doubt.

His body was dressed in his priestly robes, placed in a wooden coffin and buried in the crypt of the Maria della Strada Church on 1 August 1556. In 1568 the church was demolished and replaced with the Church of the Gesù. Ignatius' remains were reinterred in the new church in a new coffin.

Ignatius was beatified by Pope Paul V on 27 July 1609, and canonized by Pope Gregory XV on 12 March 1622. His feast day is celebrated annually on 31 July, the day he died. He is venerated as the patron saint of Catholic soldiers, the Military Ordinariate of the Philippines, the Roman Catholic Archdiocese of Baltimore, in his native Basque Country, the Roman Catholic Diocese of Antwerp, Belo Horizonte, Junín, and Rome.

== Legacy ==
Numerous institutions across the world are named for him, including many educational institutions and Ateneo University institutions in the Philippines.

In 1852, Loyola University Maryland was the first university in the United States to bear his name. Other American universities bearing his name include Loyola University of Chicago, Loyola University New Orleans, and Loyola Marymount University.

In 1949 he was the subject of a Spanish biographical film Loyola, the Soldier Saint starring Rafael Durán in the role of Ignatius.

In 2016, he was the subject of a Filipino film, Ignacio de Loyola, in which he was portrayed by Andreas Muñoz.

Ignatius of Loyola is honoured in the Church of England and in the Episcopal Church on 31 July.

The Saint Ignatius de Loyola Catholic Church, built in 1905 in El Paso, Texas, is named after him.

In India, Loyola College in Chennai is named after him. This college was founded in 1925 by the French Jesuit priest Francis Bertram (originally known as Père François Bertrand), along with other European Jesuits.

In India, Loyola School, Jamshedpur is a premier high school offering education in English and Hindi. It was founded in 1947 and continues to be run by Jesuits.

== Genealogy ==
Original shield of Oñaz-Loyola

=== Shield of Oñaz-Loyola ===
The Shield of Oñaz-Loyola is a symbol of the Ignatius family's Oñaz lineage, and is used by many Jesuit institutions around the world. As the official colours of the Loyola family are maroon and gold, the Oñaz shield consists of seven maroon bars going diagonally from the upper left to the lower right on a gold field. The bands were granted by the King of Spain to each of the Oñaz brothers, in recognition of their bravery in battle. The Loyola shield features a pair of rampant grey wolves flanking each side of a cooking pot. The wolf was a symbol of nobility, while the entire design represented the family's generosity towards their military followers. According to legend, wolves had enough to feast on after the soldiers had eaten. Both shields were combined as a result of the intermarriage of the two families in 1261. Former coat of arms of the Argentine city, Junín, Buenos Aires used until 1941 bore Loyola shield under the Sun of May and surrounded by laurel wreath.

=== Lineage ===
Villoslada established the following detailed genealogy of Ignatius of Loyola:

Lineage

García López de Oñaz
Lope de Oñaz
López García de Oñaz	Inés, dame of Loyola (~1261)
Inés de Oñaz y Loyola (~end of the 13th century)	Juan Pérez
Juan Pérez
Gil López de Oñaz	5 other brothers (see – battle of Beotibar)
Beltrán Yáñez (el Ibáñez) de Loyola	Ochanda Martínez de Leete from Azpeitia
Lope García de Lazcano	Sancha Ibáñez de Loyola
Sancha Pérez de Iraeta (+1473)	Juan Pérez de Loyola	Maria Beltranche	Elvira	Emilia	Juanecha
Don Beltrán Yáñez (vel Ibáñez) de Oñaz y Loyola (~ 1507)	Doña Marina Sáenz (vel Sánchez) de Licona
Sancha Ibáñez de Loyola	Magdalena de Araoz	Ochoa Pérez de Loyola	Pero López de Oñaz y Loyola	Juaniza (vel Joaneiza) de Loyola	Maria Beltrán de Loyola	Juan Pérez de Loyola
Juan Beltrán de Loyola	Beltrán de Loyola	Hernando de Loyola	Magdalena de Loyola	Petronila de Loyola	Iñigo López de Loyola

Notes:

Martín García Óñez de Loyola, soldier and Governor of Chile killed by Mapuches at the Battle of Curalaba, is likely Ignatius's nephew.

== Gallery ==
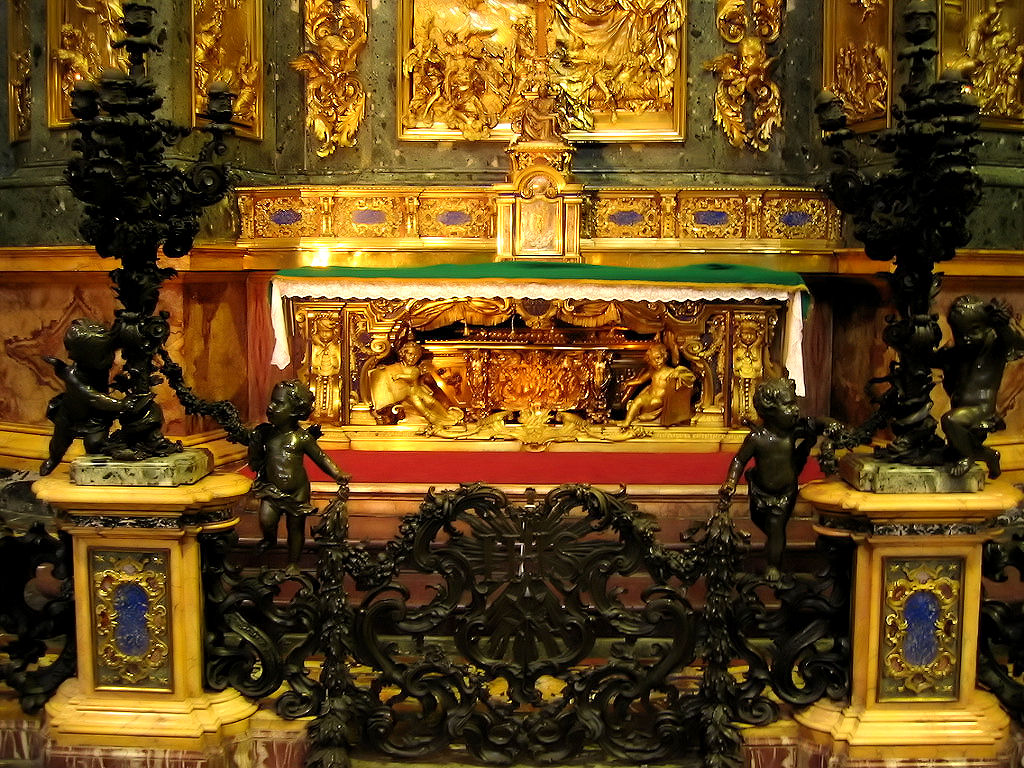
Tomb of Saint Ignatius, c. 1675

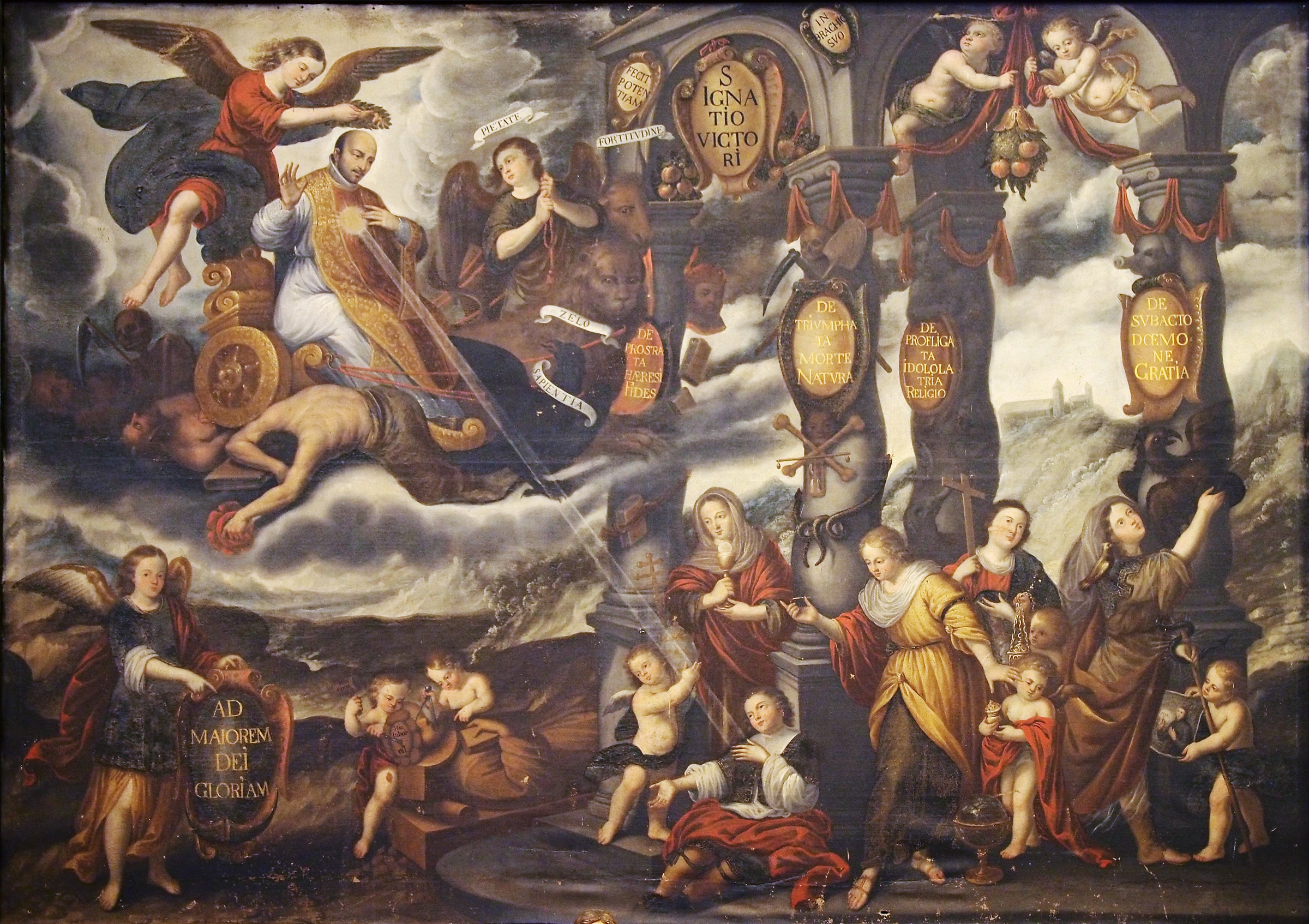
Apotheosis of Saint Ignatius

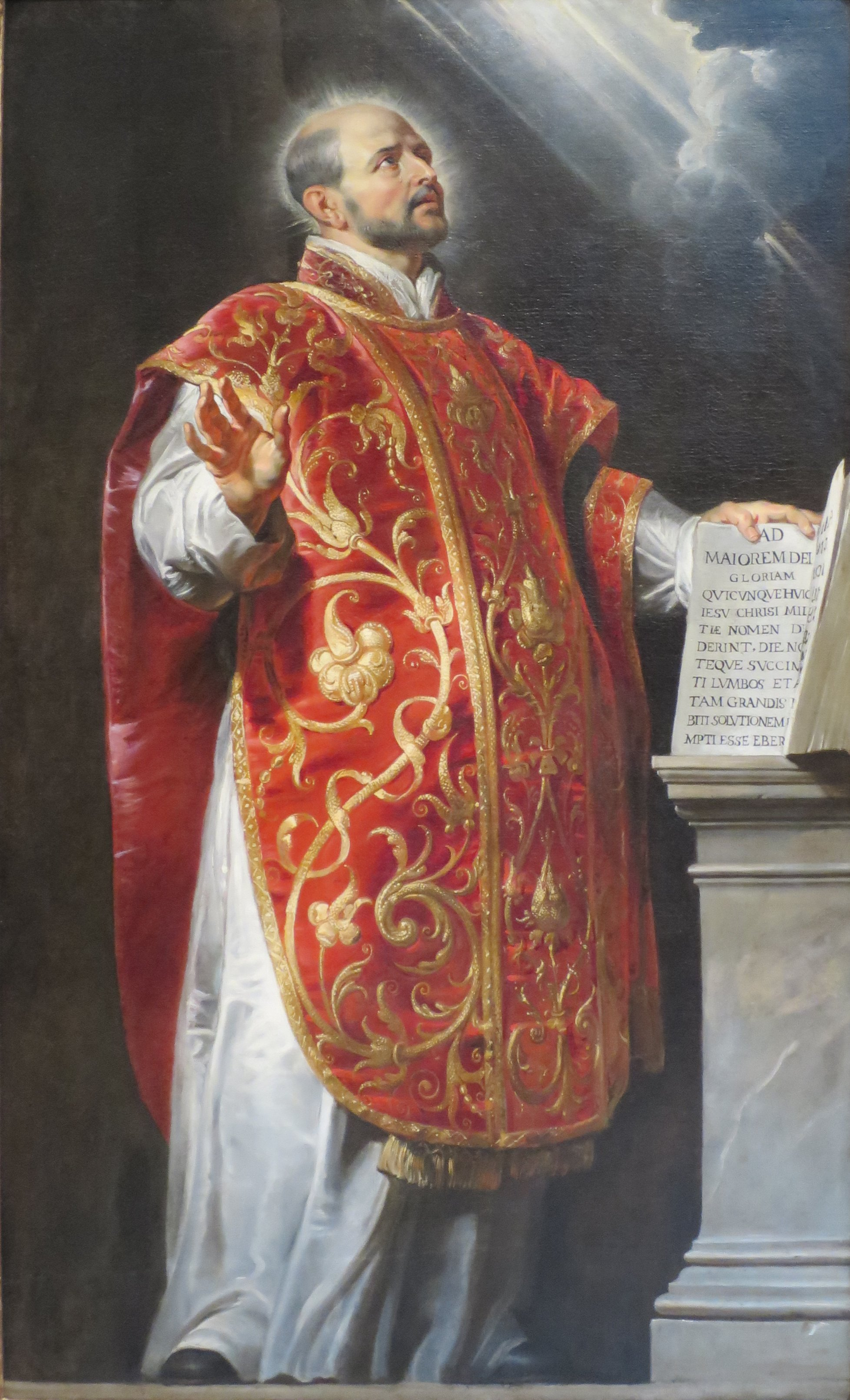
Portrait by Pieter Paul Rubens

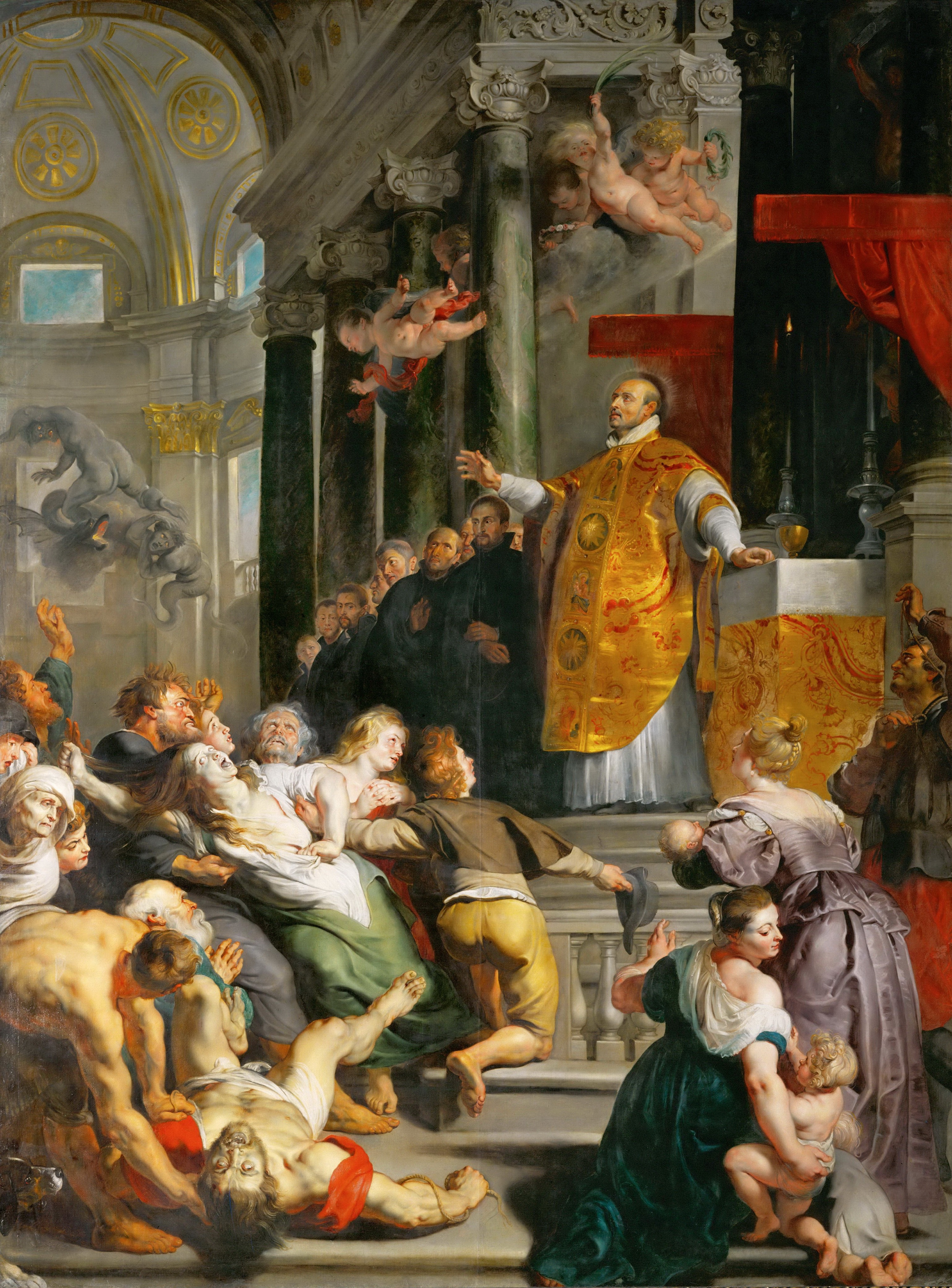
Visions of Ignatius, 1617–18, Peter Paul Rubens

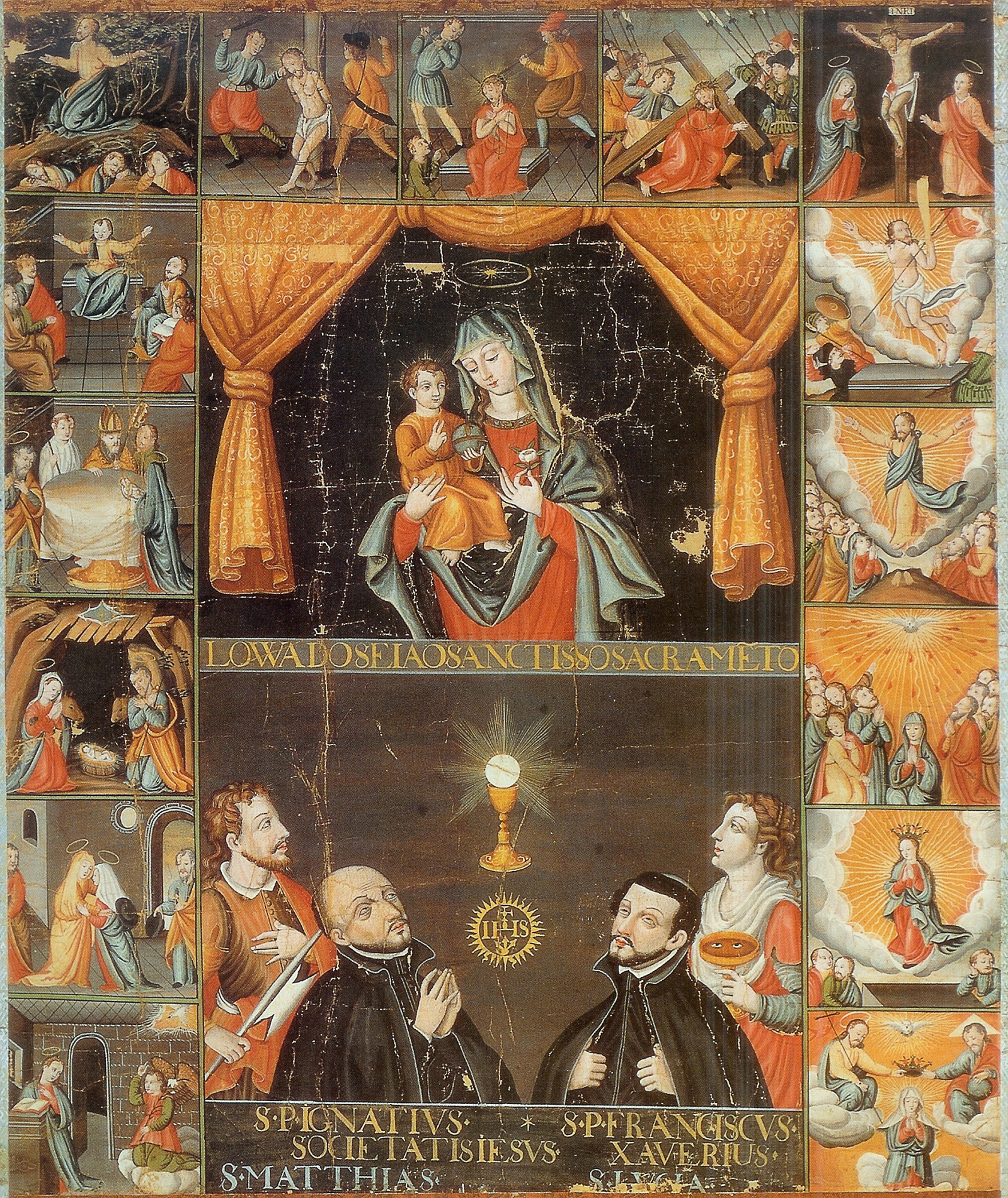
Virgin Mary with Infant Jesus and Her Fifteen Mysteries. Bottom centre: Ignatius of Loyola (left) and Francis Xavier (right)

The journeys of Ignatius of Loyola at different times

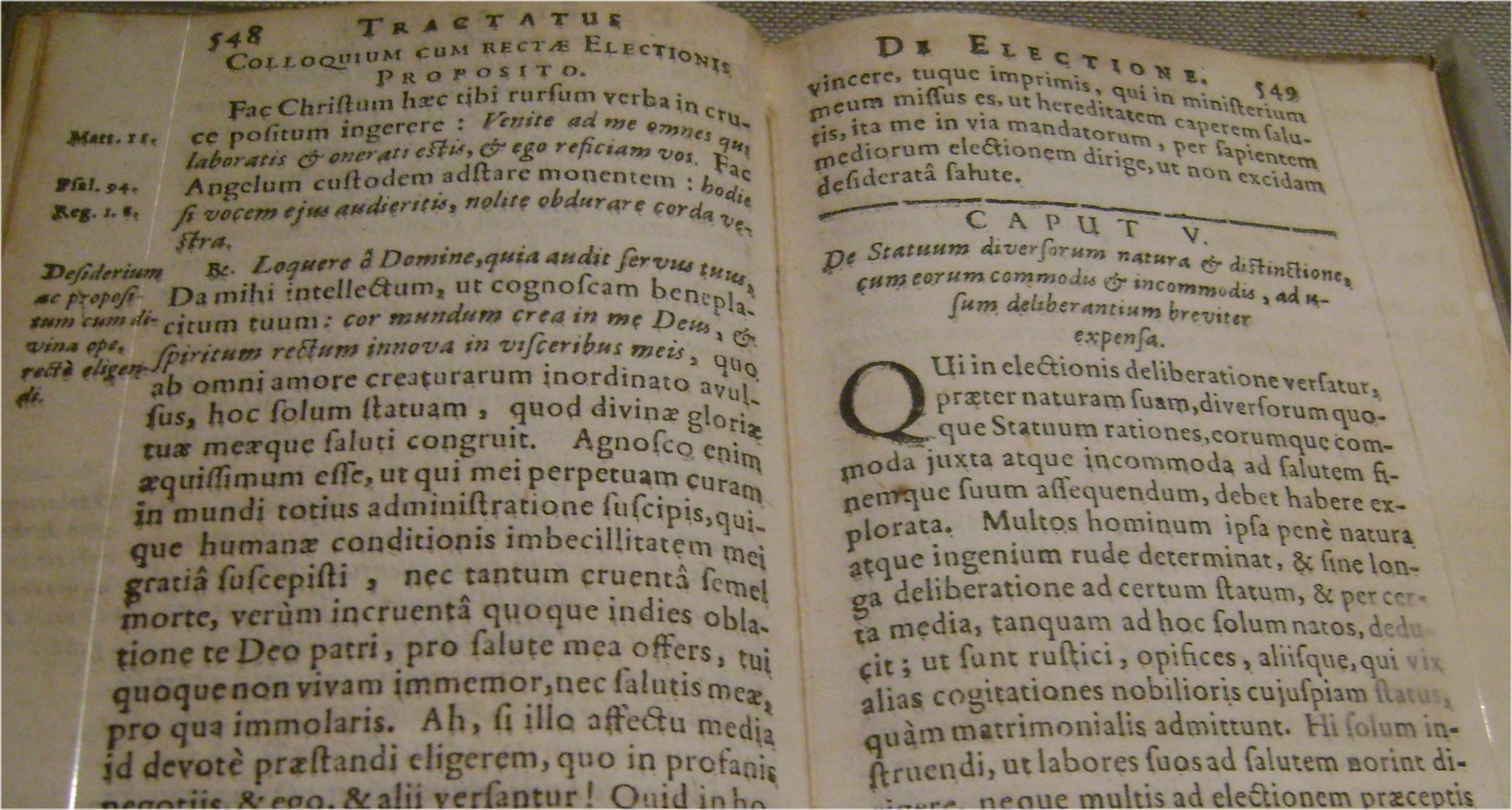
A page from Spiritual Exercises

== Bibliography ==
- The Spiritual Exercises of St Ignatius, TAN Books, 2010. ISBN 978-0-89555-153-5
- Ignatius of Loyola, Spiritual Exercises, London, 2012. ISBN 978-1-78336-012-3
- Loyola, Ignatius (1964). The Spiritual Exercises of Saint Ignatius: Saint Ignatius' Profound Precepts of Mystical Theology. United Kingdom: Crown Publishing Group. ISBN 978-0385024365
- Loyola, (St.) Ignatius (1900). Joseph O'Conner (ed.). The Autobiography of St. Ignatius. New York: Benziger Brothers. OCLC 1360267. For information on the O'Conner and other translations, see notes in A Pilgrim's Journey: The Autobiography of Ignatius of Loyola pp. 11–12.
- O'Callaghan, Joseph F. (1992). The autobiography of St. Ignatius Loyola: with related documents. New York: Fordham University Press. ISBN 978-0-8232-1480-8.

== See also ==
- Ignatian Spirituality
- List of Jesuits
- Marie-Madeleine d'Houët foundress of the Sisters, Faithful Companions of Jesus
- Martín Ignacio de Loyola
- The Cave of Saint Ignatius, a sanctuary built where Ignatius of Loyola reflected for 11 months in a grotto, in Manresa.
- Isabella Roser and Isabel de Josa, wealthy Catalan women who were Loyola's benefactors from the 1520s onwards.
- Ignacio de Loyola, 2016 film.

Catholic Church titles
New office	Superior General of the Society of Jesus; 1540–1556	Succeeded by Diego Laynez
