= 2 de mayo, la libertad de una nación =

Television series

- Genre: Historical drama
- Directed by: María Cereceda; Gonzalo Baz
- Country of origin: Spain
- Original languages: Spanish; French
- No. of seasons: 2
- No. of episodes: 22

Production
- Production company: BocaBoca Producciones

Original release
- Network: Telemadrid
- Release: 28 April – 17 November 2008

Dos de mayo, la libertad de una nación or 2 de mayo, la libertad de una nación (lit. '2 May, the freedom of a nation') is a Spanish period drama television series produced by BocaBoca for Telemadrid. Its two seasons aired in 2008.

== Premise ==
The fiction starts with the burial of Manuela Malasaña, and then focus on the daily-life hardships of the Madrilenian people endured under French occupation during the Peninsular War.

== Cast ==
- Celia Freijeiro as Pepita García.
- María Garralón.
- Carmen Morales de las Heras.
- Cesáreo Estébanez.
- William Miller.
- Quim Vila.
- Celine Tyll.
- Berta Hernández.
- Miguel Rellán.
- Diego Molero.
- Andreas Muñoz.
- Nando González.
- Íñigo Navares.
- Ramón Esquinas.
- Iñaki Aierra.
- Luis Felpeto.

== Production and release ==
The series was produced by BocaBoca for Telemadrid. and directed by María Cereceda and Gonzalo Baz.

Underpinning an exaltation of the Spanish nation, and forming part of a wider audiovisual effort by the regional branch of the People's Party (PP) in the Community of Madrid on the occasion of the 200th anniversary of the Dos de Mayo Uprising, the series may be interpreted as "in line with the political ideology of the People's Party and with its attitude towards the particularist discourses of Basque or Catalan peripheral nationalisms", in the view of José Carlos Rueda Laffond, and as an imprint of an "epic and patriotic ideal of a single national organic community" reflecting on the conservative ideology characteristic of the PP in the Madrid region.

The first season, consisting of 13 episodes, premiered on 28 April 2008. The broadcasting run of the 9-episode second season ended on 17 November 2008. The series re-aired on other regional broadcasters such as Canal Sur Televisión and Aragón Televisión.
