= Ignacio de Loyola =

- Directed by: Paolo Dy
- Screenplay by: Paolo Dy
- Story by: Paolo Dy; Pauline Mangilog-Saltarin; Emmanuel Alfonso, SJ; Ian Victoriano
- Produced by: Pauline Mangilog-Saltarin; Ernestine Tamana
- Starring: Andreas Muñoz
- Cinematography: Lee Briones Meily
- Edited by: She Lopez
- Music by: Ryan Cayabyab
- Production company: Jesuit Communications
- Distributed by: Solar Pictures (Philippines)
- Release dates: June 14, 2016 (Vatican City); July 27, 2016 (Philippines)
- Running time: 118 minutes
- Country: Philippines
- Language: English
- Budget: ₱50 million

Ignacio de Loyola (lit. 'Ignatius of Loyola') is a 2016 Philippine historical biographical religious drama film directed by Paolo Dy in his directorial debut. It is based on the memoirs of Ignatius of Loyola, founder of the Jesuit order who was canonized as a saint in the Catholic Church. The film stars Andreas Muñoz, a Spanish actor who portrays the titular character in the film.

== Cast ==
- Andreas Muñoz as Iñigo de Loyola
- Javier Godino as Xanti
- Julio Perillán as Father Sanchez
- Gonzalo Trujillo as Inquisitor Frias
- Isabel García Lorca as Doña Ines Pascual
- Lucas Fuica as Don Beltran de Loyola
- Mario de la Rosa as Calixto
- Jonathan D. Mellor as Inquisitor Figueroa
- Rick Zingale as Doctor Ciruelo
- Tacuara Casares as Princess Catalina
- Ben Temple as Master Ardevol
- Imanol Reta as Inquisitor Gallo
- Javier Tolosa as Lord Asparros
- Samuel Pérez as Young Iñigo

== Production ==
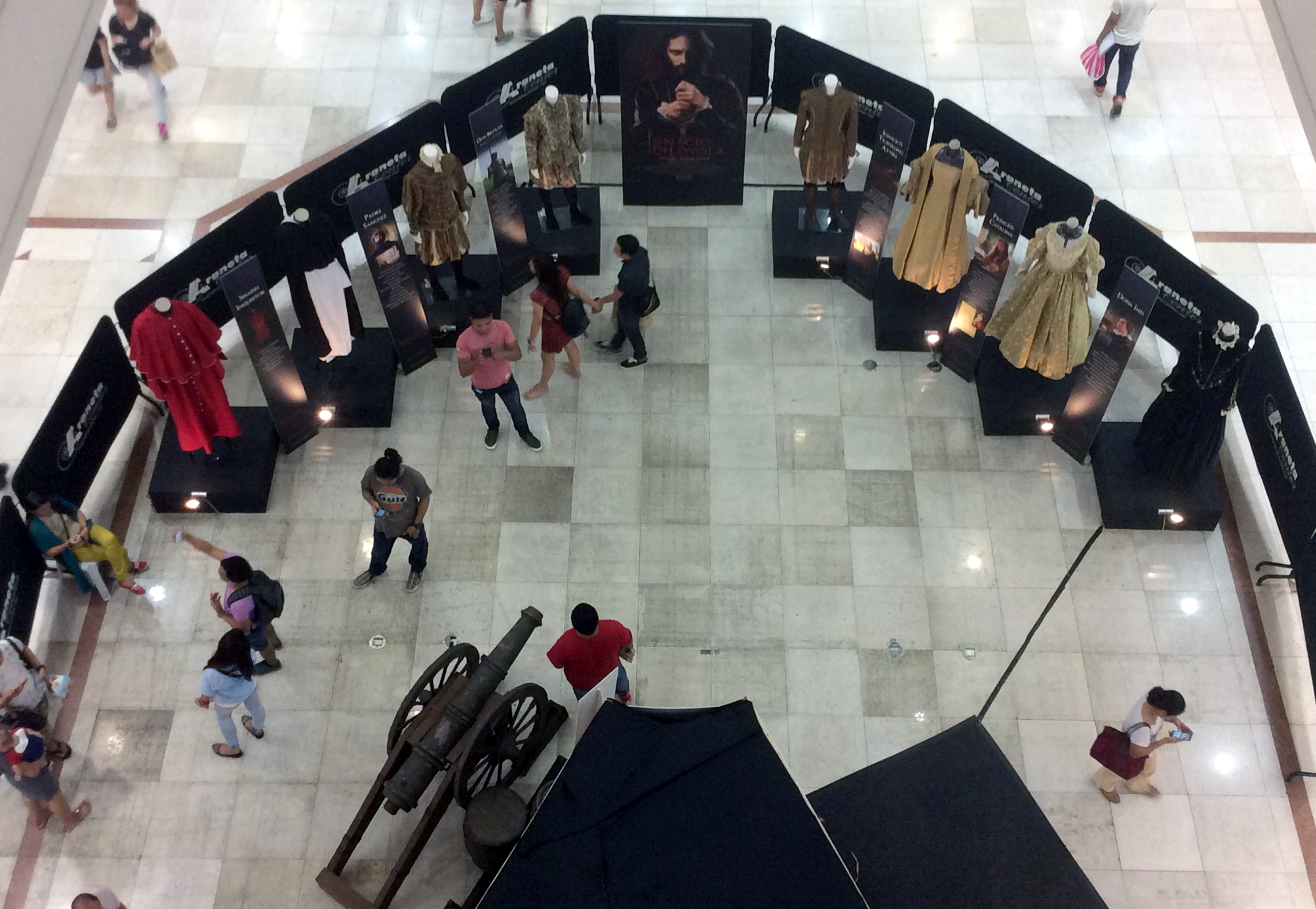
Ignacio de Loyola exhibit at the Gateway to promote the film. Among the featured items were costumes used in the film.

The English-language film was helmed by Filipino director Paolo Dy and was produced by the media arm of the Society of Jesus in the Philippines, Jesuit Communications. The musical score was written by Filipino composer Ryan Cayabyab.

The film was shot primarily in Spain, particularly in Navarra and the Basque Country, over twenty days, with a ten-hour cap per day. The film budget was pegged at ₱50 million, with The One Meralco Foundation being among the sponsors of the film. Post-production, including the film's special effects, was done in the Philippines. Dy said that the most challenging part in shooting the film was the battle scene, for which the production team had to bring in stuntmen from the Canary Islands.

It was around 2012 that the Jesuit Communications Foundation contacted director Paolo Dy about making the film. Before shooting, the director's wife Cathy Azanza-Dy sought the aid of her friends from the Philippine theater industry in developing the script. Luna Inocian read the script and provided comments, while others including Jenny Jamora, Topper Fabregas, and Steve Cadd did a table reading in Manila. They reviewed each scene's good points and identified those elements that could be scrapped. They also improved each character's arc. Dy and his wife honed each character's motivation and relationships, and brought the film's focus upon the humanity of Ignatius of Loyola, creating a protagonist with whom the audience could identify. The film adopts elements from traditional theater. The film's costumes were conceived to materially represent each of the character's personalities and are not necessarily historically accurate. Costume designer Juvan Bermil designed the approximately four hundred period costumes. The Spanish cast comprises actors and actresses also with a background in theater.

== Release ==
The film was screened at the Vatican Film Library in the Vatican City on June 14, 2016, becoming the first Philippine film to be screened in the city-state. The Philippine premiere was held at The Theater at Solaire Resort and Casino, Paranaque City on July 23, 2016. The premiere was accompanied by a live orchestra conducted by Gerard Salonga. The film then began its commercial run in Philippine cinemas on July 27, 2016.

Ignacio de Loyola is also planned to be screened in Jesuit communities and universities across the world.

The film was screened in the United States in select cinemas on August 26, 2016.

== Possible sequel ==
If reception to the film is satisfactory, a sequel to the film will be produced, this time on Francis Xavier, a friend of Ignatius of Loyola and co-founder of the Society of Jesus.
