= Isabella Roser =

Catalan noblewoman

Isabella Roser was a sixteenth-century Catalan noblewoman of Barcelona who helped Ignatius of Loyola and sponsored him, when, on returning from Jerusalem, the 30-year-old pilgrim wished to start anew his schooling. She later demanded membership of the Jesuits for herself and two female companions. Although this was initially granted it was rescinded and the order has remained open only to males ever since.

== Life ==
Isabella Roser was born into the powerful noble Ferrer family of Catalonia. She married the wealthy Barcelona merchant Juan Roser.

In the early 1520s Isabella noticed Ignatius of Loyola while listening to a sermon in the church of Santa Maria del Mar, Barcelona, and was struck by his grave and modest demeanor. She invited him to her home for dinner.

Roser became part of a group of wealthy female sponsors of Loyola. Other notable members were Inez Pacual and Isabel de Josa. The group was nicknamed the "Inigas".

In 1543, Isabella, who had been widowed in 1541, along with two female companions, her lady-in-waiting Francisca Cruyllas, and her friend Lucrezia di Bradine, arrived in Rome and obtained from Pope Paul III to be placed 'under the obedience' of Ignatius. They helped to finance and administer St Martha's, a rehabilitation center for reformed prostitutes.

On Christmas Day 1545, in Rome, the three women professed vows of poverty, chastity and obedience. Isabella also bequeathed her entire estate to the Society, although Ignatius attempted to refuse it. Rumors began to circulate that Ignatius had robbed Isabella of her fortune. This dispute went to court, which decided against Isabel. She and her companions were dismissed from the Society on 1 October 1546.

In 1547, Ignatius successfully petitioned the Pope to have the Society freed for ever from accepting 'nuns or women living in community' under spiritual obedience. Biographers of Saint Ignatius have called this the "affaire Roser".

Isabella returned to Barcelona and continued live a pious life. Eventually she entered a Franciscan convent in Jerusalem where she lived until her death.

== Conflation with Isabel de Josa ==
Since around the nineteenth century, some historians have confused the life of Isabella Roser with that of her contemporary and fellow supporter of Loyola, the scholar Isabel de Josa.
