= Cave of Saint Ignatius =

Church building in Manresa, Catalonia

Coordinates: 41.7212°N 1.8315°E

The Cave of Saint Ignatius is a sanctuary declared as a Local Cultural Heritage that includes a baroque church and a neoclassical building in Manresa (Catalonia), which was created to honor the place where, according to tradition, Saint Ignatius of Loyola shut himself in a cave to pray and do penance during his sojourn in the city from March 1522 to February 1523, where he wrote the Spiritual Exercises returning from his pilgrimage to Montserrat.

== History ==
In 1522, Saint Ignatius of Loyola lived for 11 months in a natural cave. In 1603 a chapel dedicated to Saint Ignatius was built next to the cave. In the 17th century a church was built as a lobby of the cave. Benediction of the church occurred in 1844. From 1894-96 the convent and the house of spirituality were built. In 1915-18, the aisle between the church and the cave was artistically decorated.

== Description ==
The Cave is a natural grotto facing Montserrat and over which the Church, the Jesuit Residence and the Centre of Spirituality are built. In the Cave there is an alabaster altarpiece (second half of the 17th century) that represents Saint Ignatius as penitent, with a pen in his hands and his look towards Montserrat. On the right several alabaster pictures in relief (18th century) can be seen and over one of them there are three crosses carved on the very rock where Ignatius prayed.

Before entering the Cave there is a vestibule, consisting in a spacious aisle designed by Martí Coronas, a Jesuit Brother, at the beginning of the 20th century. Four stained-glass windows in a Venetian mosaic style, bronze relief works, the mosaics and the ceiling are remarkable artistic elements. Two bronze Angels, by artist Llimona, symbolizing Saint Ignatius’ prayer and penance, are over the door of the cave. On the floor can be seen the Loyola house coat of arms, a cannon in remembrance of the Saint’s wound and a big sunflower a symbol of Ignatius’ heart open to Jesus.

The church is a baroque building next to the cave from 1759. It is an example of Jesuit architecture. It is formed by a nave with side aisles and chapels, above which runs tribunes with Baroque lattice. The exuberant baroque façades contrasts with the simplicity of the decorative lines and well proportioned sizes of interior space, and the remarkable unity of style. The Façade of the Church is exuberant Baroque styled, but in a uniformed style and proportioned dimensions.

The convent is a huge neo-Classical building, constructed between 1894 and 1896, where pilgrims from all over the world meet when they come to Manresa to practise the Spiritual Exercises. It also houses an order of Jesuits.

== Gallery ==
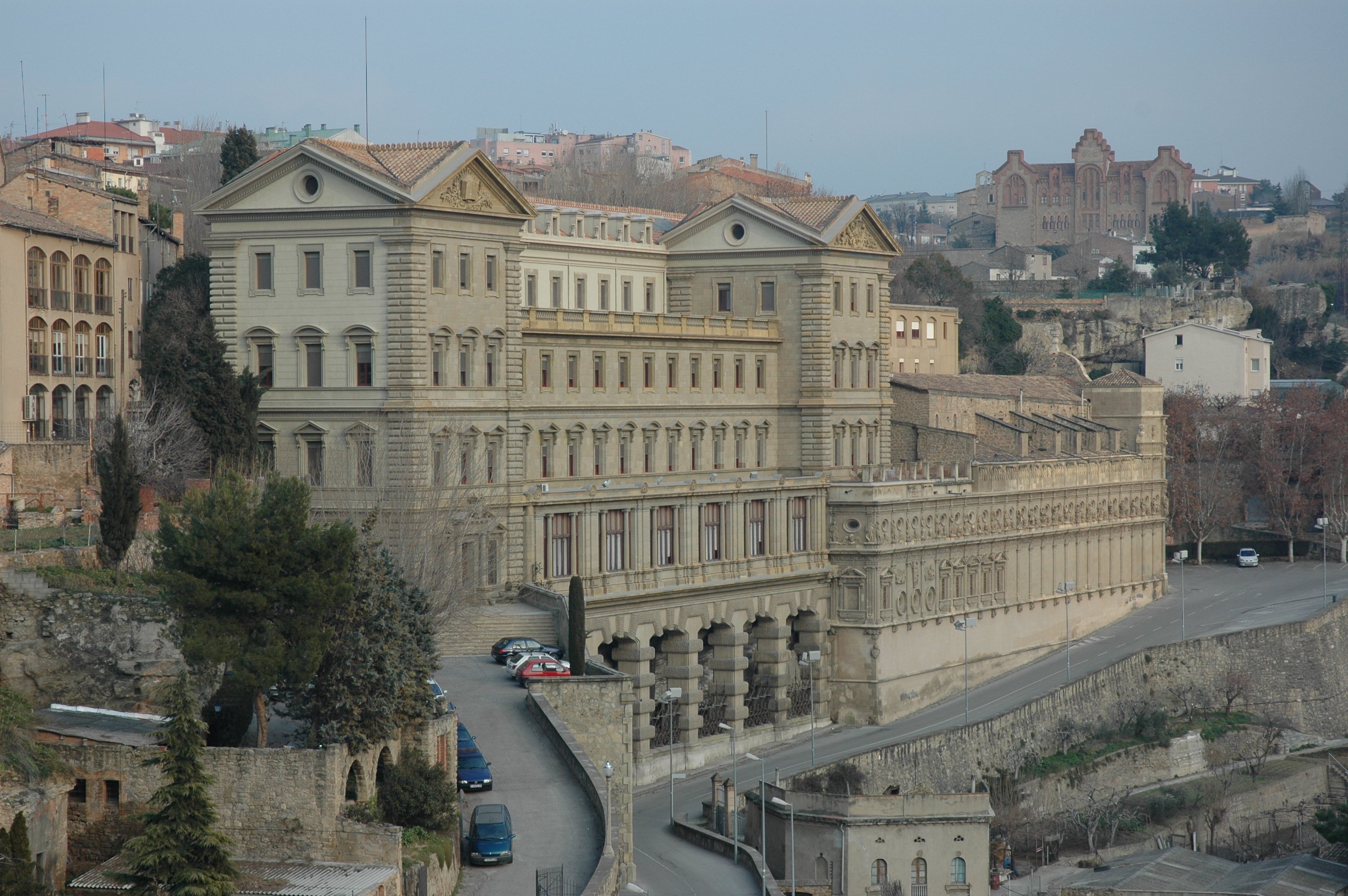
Cave of Saint Ignatius

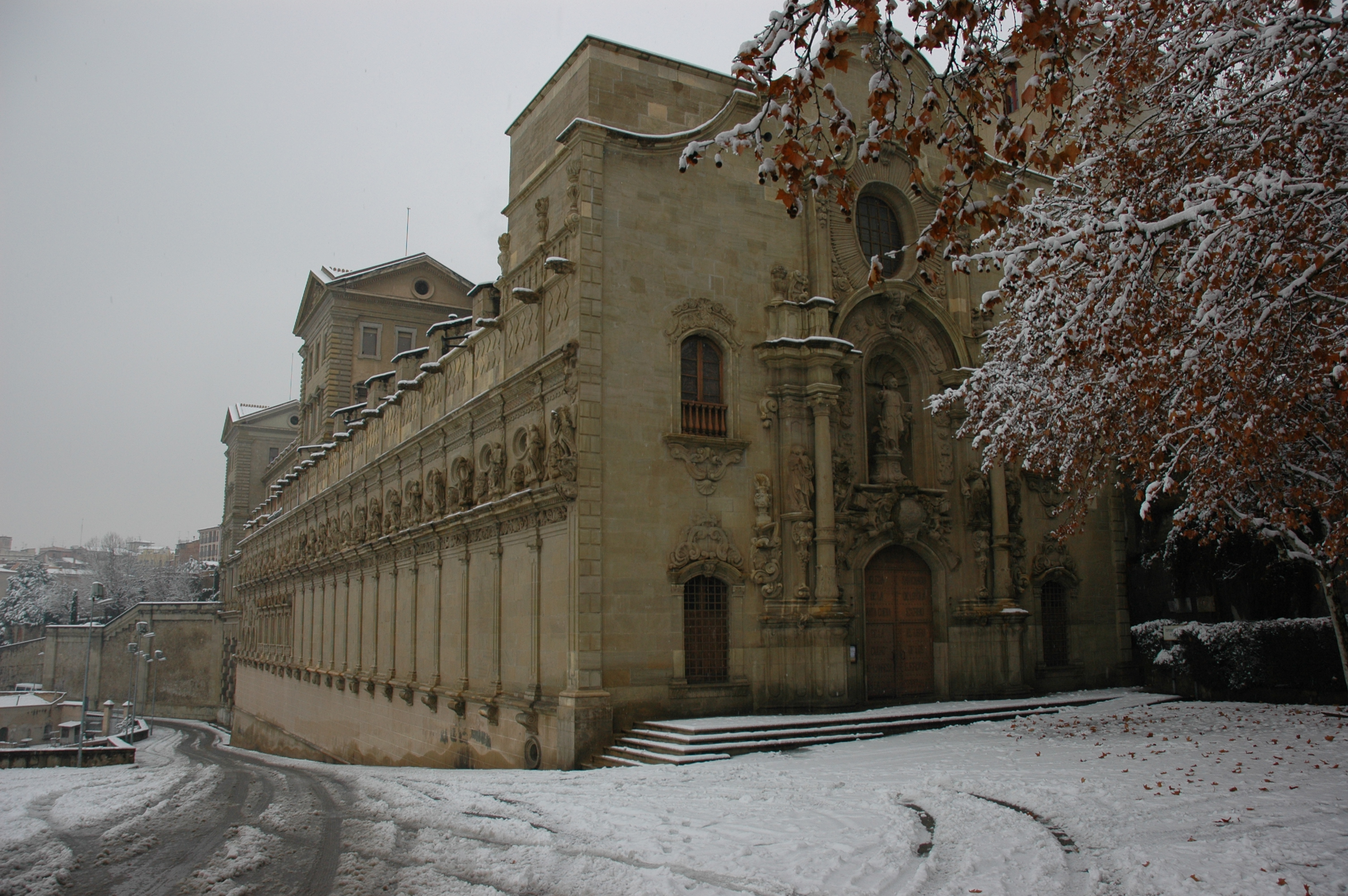
The Church

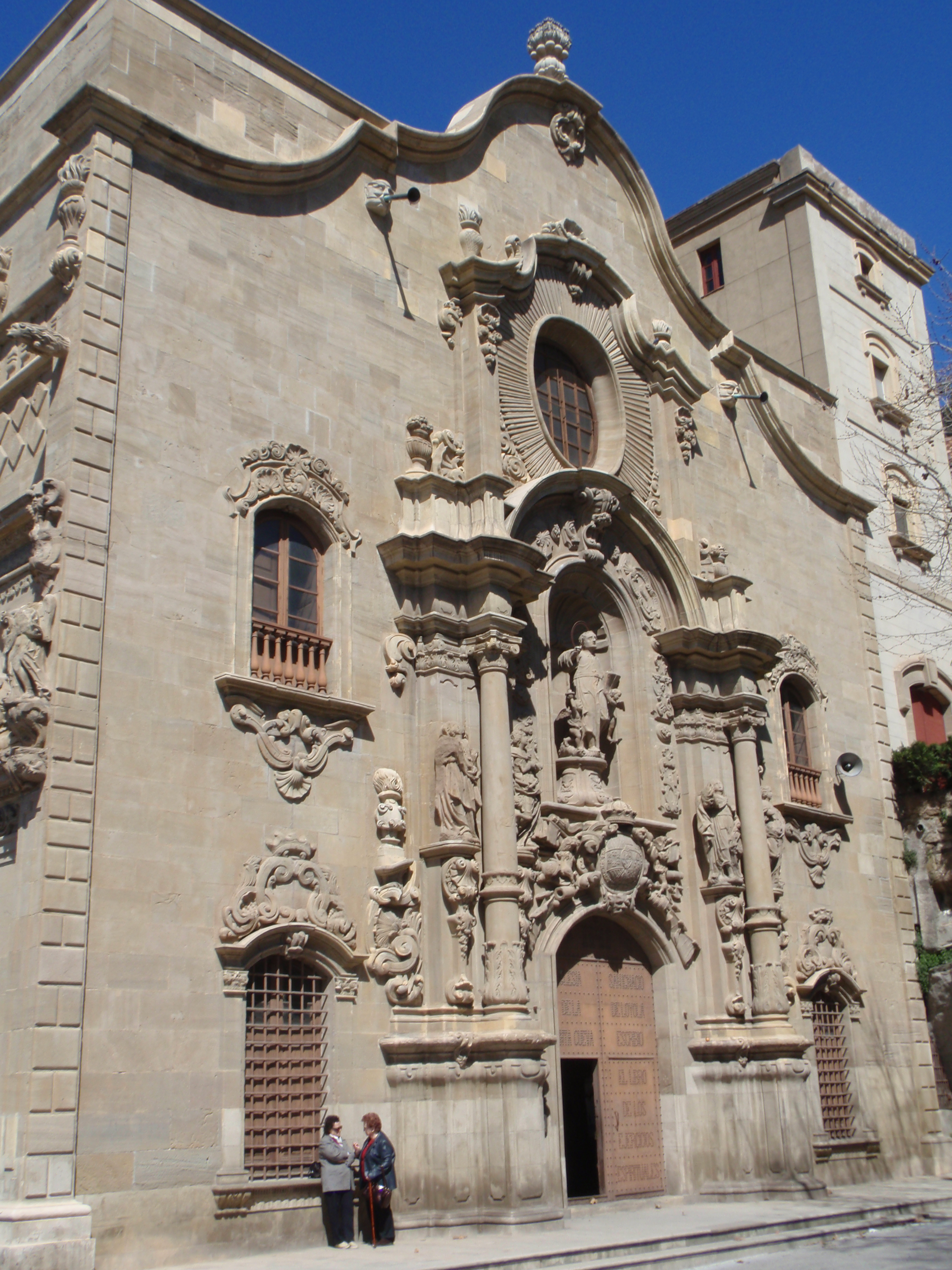
Façade

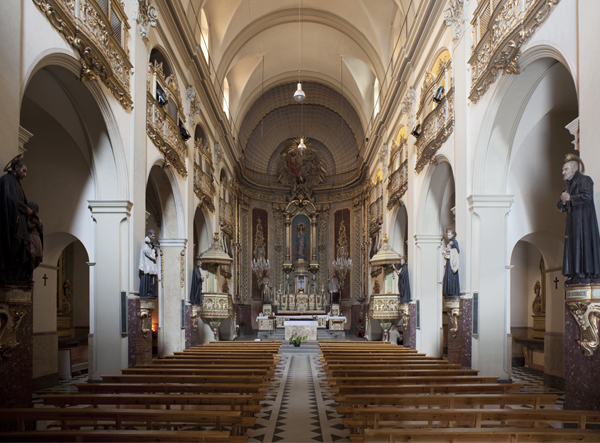
Church, inside

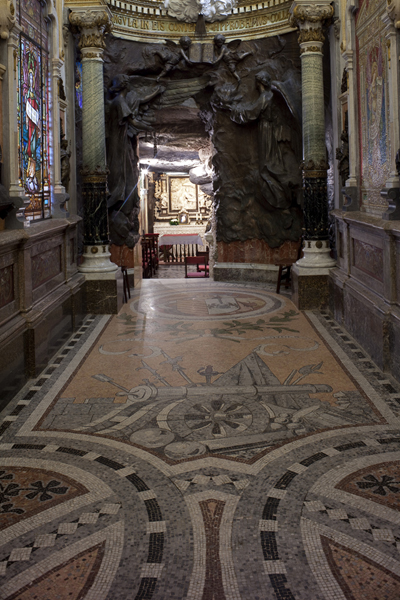
Vestibule

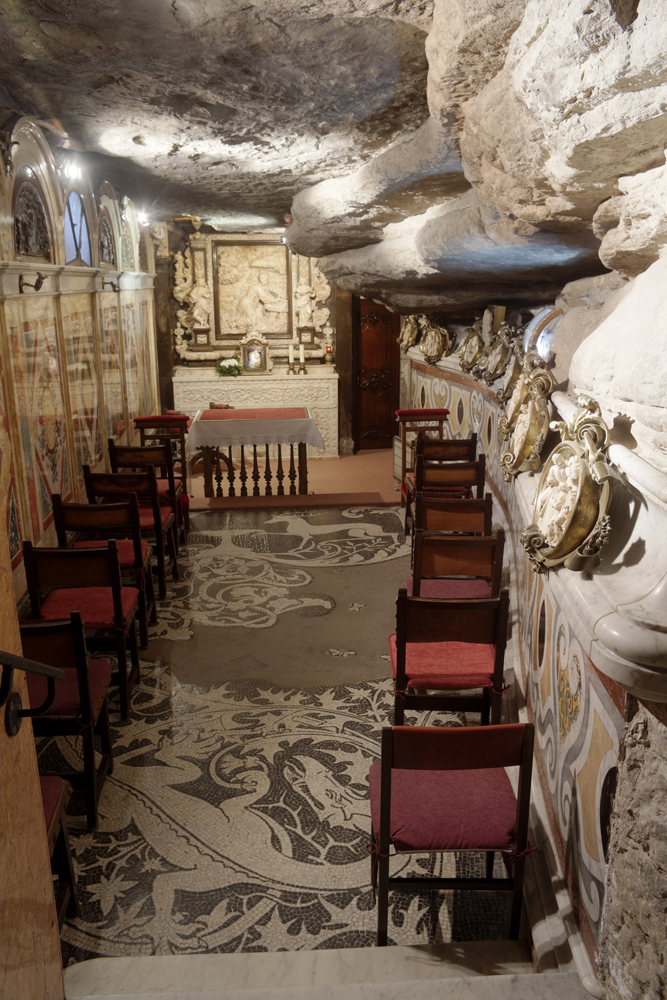
Cave

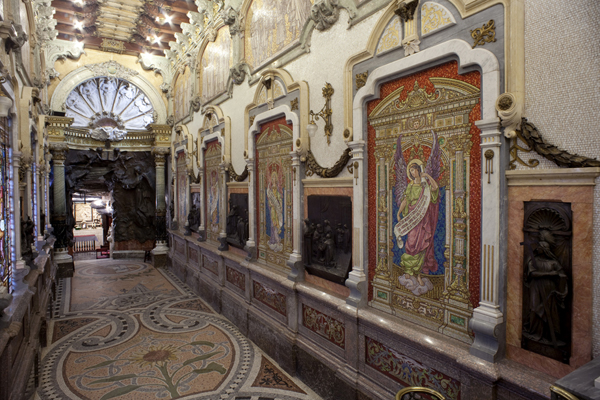
Mosaics in the vestibule

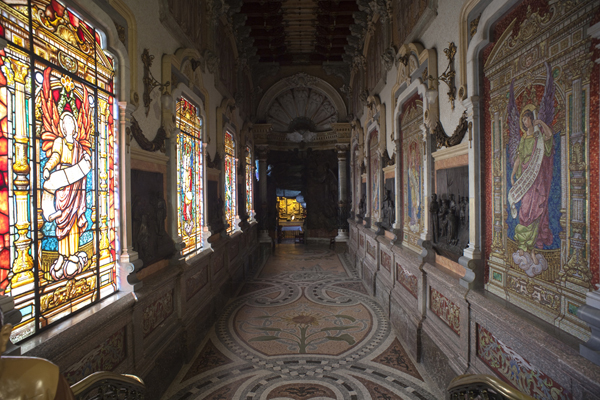
Stained-glass windows

== Renovation ==
A renovation of the Cave of Saint Ignatius was carried out in the early 2020s, during which new mosaics by Jesuit artist Marko Rupnik were installed. Rupnik’s involvement has drawn attention because he had previously been subject to canonical sanctions.

== See also ==
- List of Jesuit sites
