= Andreas Muñoz =

Spanish actor (born 1990)

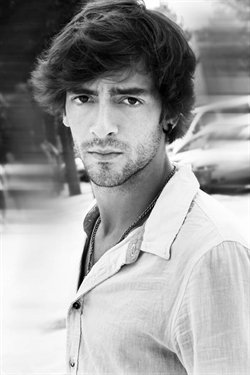
- Born: Andreas Muñoz Blázquez; 4 April 1990 (age 36); Madrid, Spain
- Occupation: Actor
- Years active: 2000 - present
- Awards: Notecortes FilmFest; 2008 Paredes - Best Actor

Andreas Muñoz (born 4 April 1990) is a Spanish actor.

== Early life ==
Andreas Muñoz was born in Madrid, Spain, in 1990. He is the eldest in a family of actors including Gara and Omar Muñoz, and son of Luís Mariano Muñoz and María Dolores Blázquez.

Muñoz began his professional acting career at the age of nine, debuting in the film The Devil's Backbone, directed by Guillermo del Toro. A few years later he received his first starring role in the TV series Dime que me quieres ["Tell me that you love me"], with Imanol Arias and Lydia Bosch.

Muñoz also studied music as a child, learning piano and drums, and presently performs with a band as drummer and singer. He studied drama at Royal School of Dramatic Art (RESAD) and is currently studying acting at the Royal Conservatoire of Scotland in Glasgow.

Muñoz became known on the international stage through his work at Disney Channel Spain. Because of his fluency in English, he traveled to the United States with the entire Disney Channel Spain crew for the Disney Channel Games and worked as presenter during the show. Since then he has started to appear in ads in English for Disney Channel USA.

== Career ==
=== Film ===
==== Leading roles ====
Arena en los bolsillos

This movie, directed by Cesar Martínez Herrada, was Muñoz' first leading role in a Spanish film.

Arena en los bolsillos is a film about 4 young boys, Iván, Lionel, Jenny and Elena, from a neighborhood on the outskirts of Madrid. They plan a journey to the sea to escape from all the misery around them and on the way to find love and solidarity. During their journey they leave their signature on the walls ... a "graffiti" is their hallmark.

Ignacio de Loyola

Muñoz plays the title role of St. Ignatius of Loyola in this Philippine production.

==== Supporting roles ====
Year	Film	Role	Director	Notes
2009	The Way		Emilio Estevez	
2008	NO-DO		Elio Quiroga	
2006	Goal II: Living the Dream		Jaume Collet-Serra	
2005	Arena en los Bolsillos	Iván	César Martínez Herrada	
2004	Vida y color	Benito	Santiago Tabernero	
2004	Volando voy	"El Gavioto"	Miguel Albaladejo	
2003	Horas de luz		Manolo Matji	
2003	Incautos		Miguel Bardem	
2002	Atraco a las 15:30		Pedro Masó	
2001	El Caballero Don Quijote		Manuel Gutiérrez Aragón	
2001	Hasta aquí hemos llegado		Yolanda García Serrano	
2000	El espinazo del diablo		Guillermo del Toro	

=== Television ===
==== Main character ====
Year	Title	Role	Notes
2011	Casi Ángeles: La resistencia	Thiago	Main character. Spanish version of the argentina series Casi Ángeles
2008/09	Dos de mayo	Antonio García Ponte "Toñin"	Produced by Telemadrid. Main character.
2007/08	Cosas de la vida ["Life Bites"]	Teo	Produced by Disney Channel Spain; Main character
2000/01	Dime que me quieres	David	Produced by Antena 3 Main character

==== Supporting roles ====
Year	Title	Role	Notes
2017	Peaky Blinders	Antonio	Season 4 Episode 1 Supporting role
2011	Rescatando a Sara	Carlos	TV movie Supporting role
2010	Los Protegidos		Antena 3 Supporting role
2010	La pecera de Eva	"Nano"	Telecinco; Supporting role
2007	Años perdidos		Made-for-TV movie
2006	Ke no		Series for Cuatro; Supporting role
2002	Código: Fuego	"Chipi"	Series for Antena 3 Supporting role
2002	Policías	David	Series for Antena 3 Supporting role

==== TV host ====
Year	Title	Network	Notes
2011	No sin mis padres	Boing	Family game show
2009	My Camp Rock	Disney Channel Spain	Spanish version
2008	Disney Channel Games	Disney Channel (USA, Spain)	Spanish host

=== Theater and others ===
Year	Title	Role	Director	Notes
2005	Pájaros de Portugal		Joaquín Sabina	Main character
2003	La pájara pinta			Documentary based on the centenary of Rafael Alberti; Starring role
1999	Euripides' Medea		Michael Cacoyanis	Collaboration

== Awards and recognition ==
Muñoz was awarded "Best Actor" at the 2008 NoteCortes FilmFest for his performance in the short film Paredes, directed by Jorge Galerón.

== Sources ==
- Andreas Muñoz at IMDb
